= Guo Yue (musician) =

Guo Yue simplified Chinese: 郭跃; traditional Chinese: 郭躍; pinyin: Guō Yuè
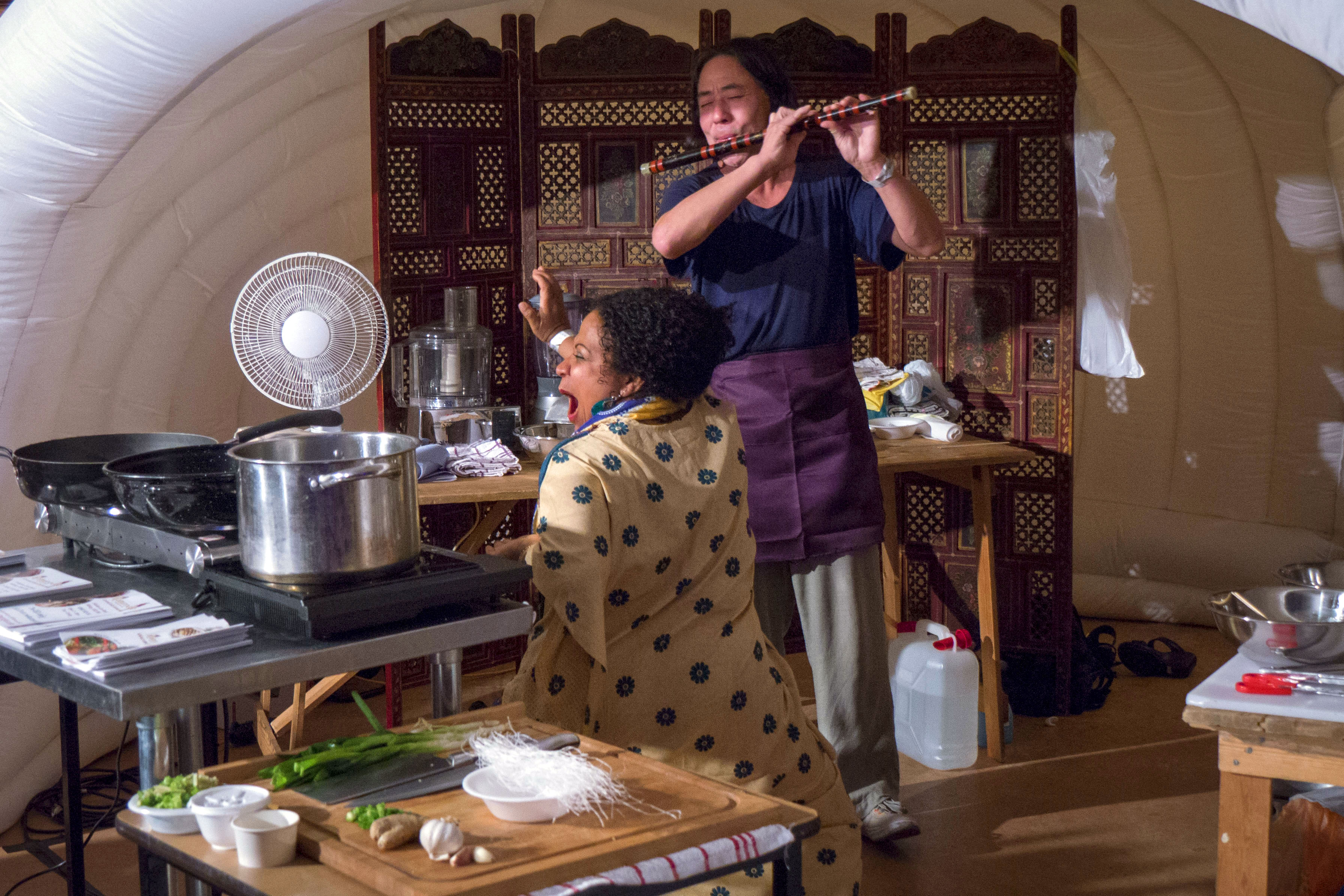
- Guo Yue and Mim Sulieman

Background information
- Born: 1958 (age 67–68); Beijing
- Genres: Chinese traditional, contemporary, film
- Instruments: dizi, bawu
- Years active: c1980–present
- Label: Real World

Guo Yue (simplified Chinese: 郭跃; traditional Chinese: 郭躍; pinyin: Guō Yuè; born 1958) is a virtuoso of the dizi (Chinese bamboo flute) and bawu (Chinese free reed pipe). He was born in Beijing, China. He plays a wide range of the bamboo flute and currently lives in London. He has recorded for Peter Gabriel's Real World label. He is also dedicated to cooking, and has found ways of combining cookery with flute playing at some of his concerts.

== Background ==
Yue was born in 1958, in Beijing, China. He was the youngest of six children. His family lived in one of the traditional courtyards surrounded by a jumble of old alleys, known as hutongs. This was situated in the area between the Drum and Bell Towers and the river, and it was here where he played as a child. His hutong courtyard specifically housed traditional musicians and their families, most of whom were originally from the countryside. His father had no formal musical training, so Yue learned technique from these neighbouring musicians, and how to put his whole body, not simply his breath, into playing the flute.

== Music ==
Yue's third sister, Yan, was living in England, and in 1982 she helped him leave China. He got a place at the Guildhall School of Music, where he studied the silver flute. Since then Yue has had a wide-ranging musical career, including composing, arranging, performing and recording traditional Chinese music. He has also recorded with his brother Guo Yi (郭艺), who plays the sheng (a sort of bamboo mouth organ). In 1990 they made a Real World album called 'Yuan'. This recording also includes the singing of his second sister, Xuan. The two brothers then performed at international festivals and concerts as the Guo Brothers. Since 1990 he has also performed at a wide range of venues including WOMAD (World of Music, Arts and Dance) Festivals worldwide as a soloist, writing and performing his own music. From 2003 he has worked in "Shan Qi" with Giovanni Amighetti, Helge A. Norbakken, Guido Ponzini, Wu Fei, and Gjermund Silset.

Yue's range has extended far beyond traditional Chinese music, and he has worked with Peter Gabriel, Sinéad O'Connor and Hothouse Flowers. Yue has also collaborated with creative musical artists from Africa, Italy and Japan. In 1992 he won an American instrumental award with the album Trisan (Real World) in partnership with the Japanese taiko drummer Joji Hirota, and the Irish singer/composer Pol Brennan. In 1995 Yue and Joji recorded the album Red Ribbon, and his bamboo flute concerto 'My Peking Alley' was performed at the 1999 WOMAD Festival in Reading with the BBC Concert Orchestra.

== Film and theatre work ==
Guo has also worked on the soundtracks for several international films. These include Bernardo Bertolucci's Academy Award-winning movies. He also played George Fenton's soundtrack theme for the Channel Four television documentary Beyond the Clouds, which won an Emmy. Its director Phil Agland said: 'In the magical hands of Guo Yue, the bawu flute creates sounds that haunt the soul'.

In 2009 Horse and Bamboo Theatre and Barefoot Books collaborated with Guo and his wife, Clare Farrow, on a theatre production based on Little Leap Forward: A Boy in Beijing, the story of his childhood; this show toured the UK.

== Cookery ==
Guo is also a specialist in authentic Chinese cooking, and gives cookery workshops in cookery schools and food festivals worldwide, often combined with music. 'Music, Food and Art' is held in Beijing, and groups of 8 to 10 students travel with him to stay in the hutongs where he grew up, visiting local markets and learning food preparation and cookery techniques, and the relationship of food to health, culture and music.

== Writing ==
Yue wrote Music, Food and Love with Clare Farrow, which was published in 2006. It's an autobiographical story of the Chinese Cultural Revolution, seen through the eyes of a young boy. Yue had very little formal education, but was born with an instinctive love of music, nature and cooking. He tells how these things enabled him to find an outlet for self-expression at a time when freedom and individuality were frowned upon, and even suppressed by the policies of Mao Zedong.

Yue describes his childhood before and during the Revolution. He manages to evoke the vivid colours, smells, tastes and sounds of a world that no longer exists. The passages about his mother are particularly moving, as she was forcibly separated from her family during the Revolution. He also describes a city that, at six o'clock in the evening, would begin to vibrate with the force and sound of everybody chopping food. In the hutongs, by listening to the speed and rhythm of the chopping, you could tell what food your neighbours were preparing.

In 2008 Little Leap Forward: A Boy in Beijing was published by (Barefoot Books). It covers much of the same autobiographical territory, but is aimed at a younger reader. Little Leap Forward offers a touching boy's view of the Cultural Revolution as the backdrop for his growing-up years. The book is named ironically. Throughout he refers metaphorically to his caged pet bird. The bird has never sung one note in the cage its confined to, but on him releasing it, the bird returns to him and sings joyously. His friend, Little-Little, asks him the question - “Wouldn't you rather be free, just for a day, than spend a lifetime in a cage? It's beautifully illustrated by the artist Helen Cann, and it was this book that formed the source material for the Horse and Bamboo production. There are black-and-white autobiographical photos of the author in the Afterword.

== Discography ==
Albums

- 1990 - Yuan (Real World)
- 1992 - Trísan (Real World)
- 1994 Red Ribbon (Riverboat Records)
- 2006 - Music, Food and Love (Real World)
- 2009 - White Jade(Squirky Music)

Contributing artist

- 1994 - The Rough Guide to World Music (World Music Network)
- 1999 - Unwired: Acoustic Music from Around the World (World Music Network)

== Books ==
- Guo, Yue, and Clare Farrow (2008). Music, Food and Love. Piatkus. ISBN 0-7499-5078-1.
- Guo, Yue, and Clare Farrow (2008). Little Leap Forward: A Boy in Beijing. Illustrated by Helen Cann. ISBN 978-1-84686-114-7.
