= Vladimir Denissenkov =

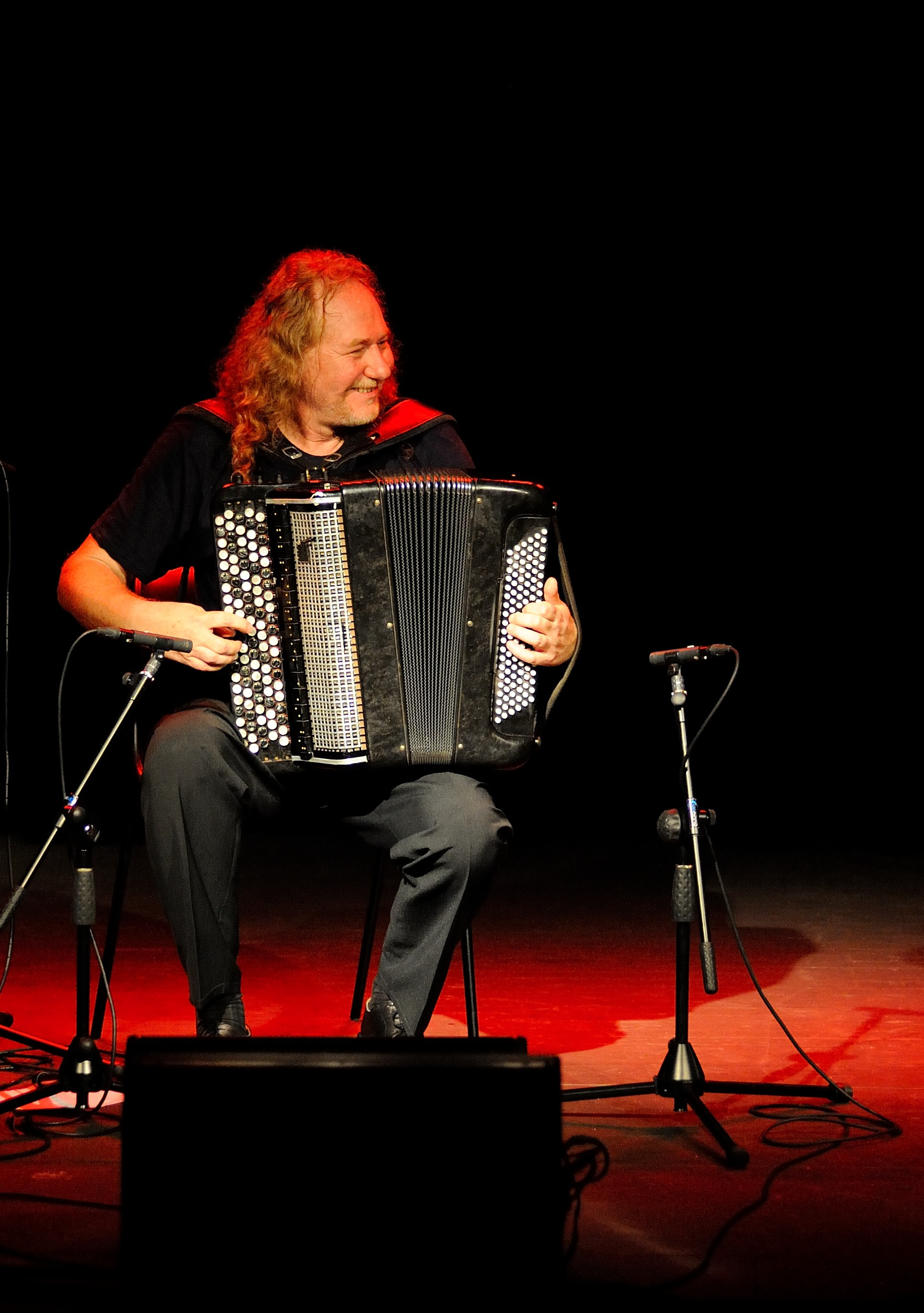

Background information
- Born: Vladimir Denissenkov in 2014; 30 March 1956 (age 70); Chernivtsi, USSR
- Genres: Russian folk, classical
- Occupations: Musician, composer
- Instrument: Bayan
- Years active: 1979–present
- Label: Felmay
- Website: www.vladimirdenissenkov.com

Vladimir Denissenkov was born in Chernivtsi (former USSR, now Ukraine) on March 30, 1956. He graduated from the Moscow Conservatory in 1979. He won with the nomination of best accordionist in a world competition of ethnic and traditional music held in 1981 in Caracas, Venezuela. From 1981 to 1990 he performed with the Moscow Philharmonic.

He was the winner of two traditional Russian music contests in USSR.

From 1986 to 1989 he was a permanent guest of the group "Zvoni Ruskie" within the programs of the major TV Soviet channels. He has performed in almost all of the Soviet Union.

He was frequently a guest musician at the Moscow State Radio.

He has performed in 40 countries around the world including the United States, Canada, Mexico, Venezuela, Brazil, Argentina, Peru, England, Norway, Finland, Germany, Spain, Italy, Austria, Switzerland.

He has worked since 1995 in Italy as a performer, both as a soloist and with artistic collaborations with top class musicians, including the Italian singer Fabrizio De André (Anime Salve), the Yiddish-Italian actor Moni Ovadia (TheaterOrchestra), the Italian pianist Ludovico Einaudi and in his 2000 masterpiece "Anastasia" with Gjermund Silset, Helge Andreas Norbakken and Giovanni Amighetti

Vladimir Denissenkov then developed a quintet concert titled "Journey in the Carpathians" with: Denis Stern on guitars, electric bass Bony Godoy, Claudia Zannone and Irina Bistrova as vocalists.

He has collaborated with the Italian comedians Ale e Franz of "Zelig" in the TV program E' tanto che aspetti? and with many other artists, including Licia Maglietta in the theater play Manca solo la domenica, Ottavia Piccolo, Lella Costa.

He composed the soundtrack of the movie Il Mondo Addosso by Costanza Quatriglio, presented at the 1st International Film Festival in Rome in October 2006.

In September 2007 he took part in the MiTo festival, Milano-Torino Settembre Musica, where he returned in 2010.

In March 2009 he was invited by Italian President Giorgio Napolitano at the Quirinal Palace, where he performed in a concert broadcast live on the National Channel "Rai Radio 3".

In 2012 he's in a theater show with the music critic and journalist Mario Luzzatto Fegiz with: Io odio i talent show.

He has appeared as a guest several times in various Italian TV programs on Rai 1, Rai 2 and Rai3 (Ballarò), Rai5, LA7 (L'infedele by Gad Lerner).

== Discography ==
- Bayan – Felmay, 1997;
- Anastasia – Arvmusic, 2000;
- Guzulka – Felmay, 2004;
- Feeling and Passion – Felmay, 2014;
