= Guo Yi =

Guo Yi may refer to:

- Guo Yi (Three Kingdoms), minister of the state of Cao Wei during the Three Kingdoms period
- Guo Yi (footballer) (born 1993), Chinese footballer
- Guo Yi (musician) (born 1954), Chinese musician
