= Rivers and Tides (soundtrack) =

Soundtrack album by Fred Frith
- Released: July 2003
- Recorded: 2002, Germany
- Genres: Chamber music; experimental music
- Length: 40:51
- Label: Winter & Winter (Germany)
- Producer: Fred Frith

Fred Frith chronology
Dalaba Frith Glick Rieman Kihlstedt (2003)	Rivers and Tides (2003)	Eye to Ear II (2004)

Music for Film series chronology
Eye to Ear (1997)	Rivers and Tides (2003)	Eye to Ear II (2004)

Rivers and Tides: Working with Time is a soundtrack by English guitarist, composer and improvisor Fred Frith, of the 2001 Anglo-German documentary film, Rivers and Tides by Thomas Riedelsheimer about the British landscape sculptor Andy Goldsworthy.

Frith composed all the music for the soundtrack and incorporated sound clips of water from the film in the final mix. The music has been described as chamber and features Frith and a German trio of Karoline Höfler, Bernd Settelmeyer and Wolfgang Stryi.

== Reception ==
Professional ratings
Review scores
Source	Rating
AllMusic	4/5 stars

In a review of the album, AllMusic had this to say of Frith: "Rivers and Tides demonstrates that Frith is not only a skewed pop genius and fearless improviser, but a remarkably empathetic soundtrack composer as well."

== Track listing ==
All tracks composed by Fred Frith.

1. "Part I" – 10:08
2. "Part II" – 3:10
3. "Part III" – 2:22
4. "Part IV" – 1:25
5. "Part V" – 4:40
6. "Part VI" – 4:15
7. "Part VII" – 11:31
8. "Part VIII" – 3:20

== Personnel ==
- Fred Frith – guitar, samples, violin, piano, berimbao
- Karoline Höfler – double bass
- Bernd Settelmeyer – percussion
- Wolfgang Stryi – soprano saxophone, bass clarinet

== Sound and art work ==
- Digitally recorded and mixed at Jankowski Tonstudio, Esslingen, Germany, 8–9 July 2002
  - Engineered by Peter Hardt
- Digital re-mixing and mastering at Bauer Studios, Ludwigsburg, Germany, 30–31 January 2003
  - Engineered by Adrian von Ripka with Stefan Winter
- Art and photography by Andy Goldsworthy
- Prints by Peter Postel
