= Hartmut Barth-Engelbart =

German writer

Hartmut Barth-Engelbart (pen names, among others Carl Hanau, HaBE, born April 1947) is a German author, songwriter and graphic artist.

== Life ==
Barth-Engelbart was born in 1947 as the eighth of nine children in a Protestant family of Michelstadt. After completing his schooling, he was a reserve officer candidate from 1966, finally a trainer with the Bundeswehr. In 1968, he began an apprenticeship as a typesetter at the Frankfurter Rundschau, but it lasted only one day, because on the following day he took part in an anti-Vietnam war demonstration in Frankfurt and fell from a canopy in the wake of political confrontations and broke his ankle joints on both feet.

Barth-Engelbart began studying psychology and pedagogy in 1969, changed to primary school pedagogy after four semesters and passed his second state examination in 1978. From 1971 to 1974 he was a lecturer at a primary school in Frankfurt-Rödelheim and a member of the strike committee of the lecturers. In 1972 he became a member of the "Arbeitsgemeinschaft junger Lehrer und Erzieher" (Association of Young Teachers and Educators) at the Gewerkschaft Erziehung und Wissenschaft (AjLE) and the GEW-Landesvorstands.

In 1974, Barth-Engelbart became a member of the Communist League of West Germany (KBW), for which he unsuccessfully ran for office in the state elections in Hesse in 1978. A party expulsion due to lack of "line loyalty" preceded his resignation in 1979.

From 1974 to 1978, Barth-Engelbart was deputy chairman of the staff council of the study seminar; from 1974 to 1976, he was involved in setting up the GEW Group and GEW chairman in Bruchköbel-Süd. He was expelled from the GEW in 1978, as a result of an incompatibility decision against the KBW.

Since he was not immediately taken into the school service, in 1978, he worked until 1991 in different jobs. In 1980, he became member of the Gewerkschaft Öffentliche Dienste, Transport und Verkehr, the strike leadership and the ÖTV regional board, then worked again, from 1991, in the school service. In 1993, he became a civil servant, working as a primary school teacher.

According to his own statements, he was a primary school teacher and children's choir leader until 2006. Since then he has been working full-time as a writer, songwriter and graphic artist.

Together with the composer and saxophonist Wolfgang Stryi of the Ensemble Modern, Barth-Engelbart organized several readings between 1991 and 2004.

In September 2003, Barth-Engelbart initiated the Hanau Resistance Readings at Freiheitsplatz on the Viennese model.

== Publications ==
- Anthologie 2009 - Die Würde des Menschen ist. Literaturforum Hanau/Main - Kinzig ISBN 3-940372-10-2/ISBN 978-3-940372-10-9
- „C'est la vie“ oder was sind wir doch für Schweine geworden, Amsterdam 1991. ISBN 3-89408-306-9.
- Eine Abrechnung mit dem Rechnen. In Karlheinz Burk: Die neue Schuleingangsstufe, Beltz: Weinheim, Basel 1998. 147 p. ISBN 3-407-62387-9.
- Osterspaziergang. In Menschenversuch, Collage-Roman, Edition Gallas: Munich 2000.
- Menschenversuch, Munich 2000. ISBN 3-00-007341-8.
- Lakonisches Lächeln. Erzählung, Yedermann: München-Riemerling 2001. 99 p. ISBN 3-935269-14-5.
- „Grenzgänger“, Collageroman zwischen Polen und Deutschland, in 17 × Lyrik&Prosa, Hanau 2001. ISBN 3-927040-00-2.
- 26 Gedichte & Poeme, in 7 × Krieg und Un-Frieden, Hanau 2003. ISBN 3-927040-00-2.
- Widerstandslesungen in Hanau. In: El Awadalla, Traude Korosa (editor): ... bis sie gehen. Vier Jahre Widerstandslesungen. Ein Lesebuch. Sisyphus: Klagenfurt 2004. ISBN 3-901960-19-8. p. 151-ff.
- Unter Schlag Zeilen: befreite Worte – gebrochene Reime zur Lage, Zambon-Verlag, Frankfurt am Main 2005. ISBN 3-88975-107-5.
- Zora, Zambon-Verlag, Frankfurt am Main 2005, 58 p. ISBN 3-88975-128-8.
