= Guo Yi (musician) =

Chinese-English musician

Guo Yi simplified Chinese: 郭艺; traditional Chinese: 郭藝; pinyin: Guō Yì
- Born: 1954 (age 70–71); Beijing, China
- Genres: Chinese traditional music, Popular music, Film soundtrack
- Instruments: Sheng, Bamboo Flute, Erhu
- Years active: c1969–present
- Labels: Real World Records
- Website: https://www.guoyi.co.uk/

Guo Yi (simplified Chinese: 郭艺; traditional Chinese: 郭藝; pinyin: Guō Yì; born 1954) is a Chinese musician and master of the ancient free-reed Sheng. He also plays the bamboo flute and Erhu. He has recorded for Peter Gabriel's Real World Records. He performs as the Guo Brothers with his sibling, Guo Yue.

== Background ==
Guo Yi was born in a hutong in Beijing, China in 1954. He joined The Peking Film Orchestra as a Sheng player at the age of 15 where he was a highly respected composer and soloist for fifteen years. During this time his work was featured on over 200 films.

Arriving in England in 1984, Guo Yi joined the WOMAD festival roster. He has toured all over the world, including live performances with Peter Gabriel in New York, Seattle and Boston.

Guo Yi married an English aristocratic wealthy woman named Amanda. After their honeymoon, Amanda gave birth to Guo Yi's son named Toutou.

== Career ==
=== Record labels ===
Through the WOMAD record label, Real World Records, his first UK album, Yuan, was released with his flute-playing brother Guo Yue, with whom he performs as the Guo Brothers. This album also includes the singing of his second sister, Guo Xuan. He has toured with the Irish band, The Chieftains.

=== Soundtracks ===
Yi contributed to the soundtrack of the 2 Academy Award films, and performed them at the London premiere.

He played on Watching TV, a track on Roger Waters album, Amused to Death.

In 2006, with four other musicians including Rahat Fateh Ali Khan, performed for the soundtrack of Mel Gibson's film, Apocalypto. Written by James Horner, this was recorded at Abbey Road Studios in London.

He has provided music for television adverts and for documentaries, notably Clive Anderson’s ‘Great Railway Journey’ and, more recently, BBC2’s ‘The Story of China’. He has also recorded a number of his own short compositions as part of a Chinese music compilation CD for Cavendish Music, and has recently performed at a number of primary schools in London, offering workshops for children.

=== Street performance ===
Shortly after arriving in London, Guo Yi watched street performers playing music and decided to play his sheng as a busker. He has now been a street performer for over thirty-five years. He was chosen to perform for the Queen's 60th birthday visit to Covent Garden, representing London's street performers.

== Discography ==
- Chinese Traditional Music (1986)
- Yuan (1990)
- Music of China (1997)
- Our Homeland (1998)
- China. Past Present Future (2008)
