= Ayub Ogada =

Kenyan singer (1956–2019)

- Birth name: Job Seda
- Born: 1956 Mombasa, Kenya
- Died: 1 February 2019 (aged 63)
- Genres: World music
- Occupation(s): Singer, songwriter, musician, actor
- Years active: 1979–2019
- Labels: Real World Records; Long Tale Recordings
- Website: ayubogada.com

Job Seda (1956 – 1 February 2019), better known as Ayub Ogada, was a Kenyan singer. He was a singer favoring the nyatiti (an eight-stringed lyre with its origins credited to the Luo, a tribe in Nyanza Kenya) as his characteristic instrument. His music is known to have a natural feel to it, having songs of birds, the calls of animals and the sounds of children playing in the background.

Ayub Ogada was also an actor landing major roles in films including the Academy Award-winning Out of Africa (1985) and Kitchen Toto (1987).

== Biography ==
Ayub Ogada was born in 1956 in Mombasa, Kenya. He is a descendant of the Luo people of Nyanza Kenya and was influenced by their musical heritage by his parents who were musicians. They performed Luo music to Kenyan and US audiences. Ayub’s experience of travelling with his parents to the US and his exposure to both western and African cultures had a profound effect on his music and outlook.

While at school in Kenya, Ayub played various instruments in bands and embraced both traditional and modern music. In 1979, after leaving school, he co-founded the African Heritage Band, fusing traditional music with the sounds of rock and soul that Ogada and his bandmates heard regularly on the radio.

In 1986, Ayub set his sights on the UK and traveled to London clutching his Luo nyatiti (an eight-string traditional lyre). He scraped a living by busking on the city’s streets and the London underground. In 1988, he was approached and asked to play at Peter Gabriel’s WOMAD Festival in Cornwall. His breakthrough came there. Perchance a band cancelled and Ayub’s ten-minute slot stretched to a full set. Among the won over fans that day was Peter Gabriel himself.

Ayub was invited to take part in one of the recording weeks at Peter Gabriel’s Real World Studios in Wiltshire. In 1992 he sang backing vocals on Peter Gabriel’s Track Digging in the Dirt together with Peter Hammill and Richard Macphail. In 1993, he recorded his first album En Mana Kuoyo (Just Sand) at the studio and he toured extensively with Peter Gabriel and WOMAD.

In 1998, Ayub started working with Giovanni Amighetti and Helge Andreas Norbakken on the Salimie project. Playing several gigs including a concert in Rome in front of the Roman Colosseum for FAO and recording the Tanguru album for Intuition.

Ayub’s music is on the soundtracks of films such as I Dreamed of Africa (2000), The Constant Gardener (2005), Samsara (2011) and The Good Lie (2014). His music was also used in the soundtrack for Ewan McGregor and Charlie Boorman’s BBC series' Long Way Round and Long Way Down as well as NBC's short-lived action drama series, The Philanthropist.

Ayub has also acted under his birth name, Job Seda. He played Robert Redford's Maasai warrior assistant in Out of Africa (1985) and also starred in The Kitchen Toto (1987).

"Kothbiro", was included in a sequence, and in the soundtrack of the Mexican film "La Habitación Azul", 2002. This song also features as one of the tracks in the 2012 Documentary Feature by Ron Fricke "Samsara".

In July 2005, Ayub Ogada performed at the Live 8 concert Eden Project as the opening act with his band, Union Nowhere. They released the album Tanguru in 2007, the year Ayub moved back to Kenya.

In 2012, the English musician Trevor Warren went to Kenya to visit Ayub. Together with the Kenyan musician and engineer Isaac Gem, they composed and recorded the album Kodhi (meaning seed in Luo). Kodhi: Trevor Warren's Adventures with Ayub Ogada was released on Long Tale Recordings on 20 April 2015. Ayub was also included in the making of Queen Elizabeth II's diamond jubilee song which was played by the Commonwealth band and Gary Barlow and Andrew Lloyd Webber directed it.

Following Ayub's death in 2019, producer and composer Trevor Warren compiled and produced the album Omera: The Further Adventures of Trevor Warren with Ayub Ogada from unused recordings, mostly made during the sessions for Kodhi. A double album, it includes performances from Hossam Ramzy, Dudley Phillips, Toby Shippey and Marco Megido. Disc two contains 're-imaginings' of various pieces by Count Dubulah / Dub Colossus, Peter Chilvers, Trevor Warren, Bernard O'Neill, and Oren Kaplan.

He is credited on the Kanye West album Ye as a co-songwriter of the track "Yikes".

He died in February 2019, at the age of 63.

== Discography ==
=== Albums ===
- 1993: En Mana Kuoyo
- 1998: Tanguru
- 2015: Kodhi: Trevor Warren's Adventures with Ayub Ogada
- 2022: Omera: The Further Adventures of Trevor Warren with Ayub Ogada

=== Singles ===
- 2005: "Dicholo"
- 1993: "Koth Biro" was featured on the soundtrack of the movie The Constant Gardener, which was a political thriller shot in Kenyan location.

== See also ==
- Luo people of Kenya and Tanzania
