= Mangtong =

Wind instrument of the Miao and Dong people of southeastern China

The mangtong (Chinese: 芒筒; pinyin: mángtǒng) is a Chinese end-blown free reed wind instrument. It is used primarily by the Miao and Dong ethnic groups of the southern Chinese provinces of Guizhou and Guangxi, although it is sometimes used in contemporary Chinese compositions for the traditional instrument orchestra.

The instrument consists of a bamboo-free reed pipe without finger holes, which is fitted with a metal free reed; the instrument's playing pipe is placed inside a bamboo resonator of larger diameter. The mangtong is made in several different sizes, with the largest up to two meters in length. As the mangtong produces only a single pitch, several mangtong are normally played together in hocket. Mangtong are often played together with an ensemble of free reed mouth organs called lusheng, serving as the bass instruments of that ensemble.

A modernized version of the mangtong, called gǎigé mángtǒng (Chinese: 改革芒筒; lit. 'reformed mangtong'), was developed in the 20th century.

== See also ==
- Lusheng
- Yu (wind instrument)
- Sheng (instrument)
- Traditional Chinese musical instruments
- Music of China
