= Miao festivals =

Ethnic group native to South China and Southeast Asia

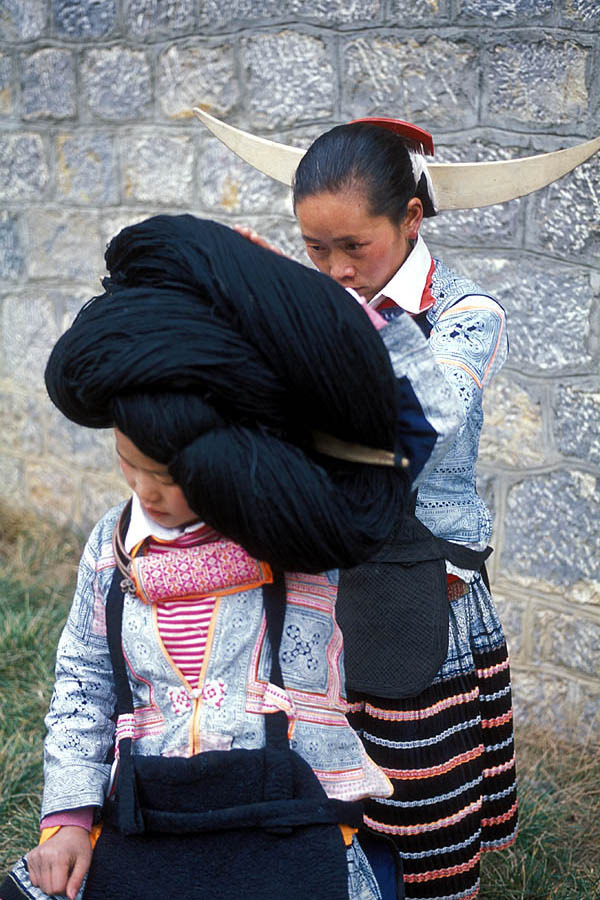
- Headdress of the Long-horn Miao—one of the small branches of Miao living in the 12 villages near Zhijin County, Guizhou

Regions with significant populations
- China: 9,426,007 (2010)

Miao festivals
- Chinese: 苗族节日
Transcriptions
Standard Mandarin
- Hanyu Pinyin: Miáozú
Wu
- Romanization: Miau-zoh
Hakka
- Romanization: Mèu-tshu̍k
Southern Min
- Hokkien POJ: Biâu-cho̍k
- Teochew Peng'im: Miêu-tsôk
Eastern Min
- Fuzhou BUC: Mièu-cŭk

There are many traditional festivals of the Miao people, including the New Year of the Miao, 8 April, the Dragon Boat Festival, the New Year's Eating Festival, and the Autumn Festival: among these, the Miao New Year is the most solemn one. The Miao Year is equivalent to the Spring Festival of the Han nationality, which is usually held after autumn.

On the morning of the festival, people put the prepared delicacies on the stove beside the fire to worship their ancestors, and smear wine on the nose of the cows to show their reward for their hard work during the year. Young men and women dance in full costumes.

== Festivals of Miao minority in China ==
There are many festivals for Miao minority in China. Some of them are celebrated every year, and some are different.

=== Miao New Year ===
The New Year of the Miao is the New Year of the Miao people, which is usually held when the autumn harvest is over and the agricultural work of the year is basically over. This celebration has three main purposes: the first is to mourn Chiyou, the ancestor of the Miao nationality who died in the tribal war more than 5,000 years ago; the second is to celebrate the harvest of a year's work; and the third is to worship the ancestral spirits and the maple, bamboo, and rocks that the Miao people regard as protectors.

Since ancient times, the Miao people consider the lunar month as the beginning of the year, and have traditional customs of the Miao Year. In modern times, the Miao people in some areas have started to celebrate the Spring Festival instead of celebrating the Miao New Year. But in many Miao areas, both the Spring Festival and the Miao Year are celebrated, and the Miao Year is more important. The date of the Miao New Year varies from place to place. Prevalently it is in October of the lunar calendar, or in some cases in November or the first month of the lunar calendar. The content and form are similar in different places.

=== March 3rd Festival ===
The "March 3rd" Miao Love Song Festival is a traditional event for local Miao residents. During the event, villagers who work elsewhere, women who marry outside the village, and young people from dozens of nearby villages gather for the event. Therefore, the festival serves as an occasion for villagers to worship ancestors and reunite with relatives and friends, as well as a time for village youth to pursue romance.

=== Sisters' Meal Festival ===
The Miao Sisters Festival, a traditional festival of the Miao people in Laotun and Shidong, Taijiang County, Guizhou Province, is one of the national intangible cultural heritages. The Miao Sisters Festival is celebrated between 16 and 18 March (on the Chinese lunar calendar).

The Miao Sisters Festival is centered on young women, and the main activities are singing songs and dancing wearing costumes, travelling parties, eating sisters' meals, and exchanging tokens between young men and women. The festival is large in scale and rich in unique content. Eating sister's meal is an important ceremonial matter on the Miao Sisters' Day. The sister meal is also a token given by the girls to couples to express their affection, and it is the most important symbol of the festival. Catching fishes and shrimps in Shimoda is one of the sister rice events, and drumming is an important way for the entire community to participate to the festival. Under the elaborate dress of their parents, the girls dressed in festive costumes gather at the drum field to step on the drums: the Miao people show their clothing culture in this way. In the evening, young men and women sing songs, talk about love, men ask women for sister meals, and girls hide tokens in sister meals to express their different feelings for men.

=== Dragon Boat Festival ===
Held on the Qingshui River between the 24th and 27th day of the fifth lunar month, the Dragon Boat Festival in Guizhou Province is worth seeing. The Miao people come from Taijiang, Zhenyuan and Shibing to take part in this festival.

The Guizhou Miao Dragon Boat Festival is a traditional folk event held every year by the Miao people in the Shibingtai River Basin of the Qingshui River in the southeastern part of Guizhou, China on the 25th day of the fifth lunar month after the Dragon Boat Festival. The local Miao people will row a canoe dragon boat on this day. In addition to dragon boat racing, there are other activities such as dancing, singing folk songs and so on. In the Miao language, the dragon is called "urn", and the dragon boat is called "lou urn". The Miao people in Guizhou have dragon boat shaped in unique ways and several competition rules. Compared with dragon boats in other regions, the Miao dragon boat competition is not during the Dragon Boat Festival, but after the Dragon Boat Festival. It is hollowed out of fir wood, and a canoe in the middle is the mother boat. The child boat and the mother boat are tied in a row with bamboo strips.

=== Lusheng Festival ===
The Lusheng Festival is the most common and great traditional festival in the Miao ethnic area. The main activities of the festival are taking the reeds stepping on the hall and the reeds competition. The Lusheng Festival is generally named after the Pohui (such as Shisanpo and Gulongpo). The time of the Lusheng Festival varies from place to place. The reason comes from the origin of the festival: in some cases it originates from ancient auspicious days, in others from celebrating a bumper harvest, or it can originate from myths and legends. Usually, a ceremony is held before the festival, and a respected old man from a certain village presides over the ancestors worship. Afterwards, the girls from all villages wear costumes and silver ornaments. The young men bring Lusheng to the reed field from all directions. The men and young people of each village form a circle, played the Lusheng, and dance for four or five days. The atmosphere is very lively.

=== Ku-Tibetan Festival ===
"Ku-Tibetan Festival", also known as "Eat Ku-Tibetan", "Eat Ku's Dirty" and "Thorn Bull", is the most solemn ancestor worship ceremony for the Miao and Dong ethnic groups in southeastern Guizhou and northwestern Guangxi. The festival is organized by the Miao people with various surnames, Gu Zangtou. Generally, it is carried out between villages with a close relationship in history. Xiaogu is held once a year, mostly in the slack season in the early spring and late autumn. Usually village people eat pigs, slaughter cattle, and invite relatives and friends to gather, to hold bull wrestlings and to blow lusheng. Dagu is usually held once every 13 years, and the village is the host. The most important activity of the "Kuzang Festival" is to kill cattle to worship ancestors.

== Cultural value of festivals ==
In contemporary society, Miao festivals have two important cultural effects.

The first one is the enforcement of national cohesion. The Miao people often live in mountainous areas with poor traffic, and communication is hindered. The emergence of the excellent traditional culture of the Miao people creates a way for the Miao people to communicate. In traditional festivals, the Miao people can get together to celebrate, shorten the distance between each other, and facilitate the improvement of national cohesion.

The second one is the promotion of the construction of a harmonious society. Many Miao festivals are related to labor and production. People define production plans according to the festival time to speed up the pace of social development. And during traditional festivals, Miao people concentrate on preparing for the festival. Young men and women mainly show their attractiveness by singing and dancing. People communicate with each other, which allows traditional culture to play an important role in the construction of a harmonious society. Culture should be fully developed by people.
