= Eye to Ear III =

Studio album by Fred Frith
- Released: November 2010
- Recorded: 2003–2004
- Studios: Guerrilla Recordings, Oakland, California; Jankowski SoundFabrik, Esslingen, Germany
- Genre: Experimental rock
- Length: 55:32
- Label: Tzadik (US)
- Producer: Fred Frith

Fred Frith chronology
Late Works (2010)	Eye to Ear III (2010)	Clearing Customs (2011)

Music for Film series chronology
Eye to Ear II (2004)	Eye to Ear III (2010)

Professional ratings
Review scores
Source	Rating
AllMusic	3.5/5 stars

Eye to Ear III is a studio album by English guitarist, composer, and improvisor Fred Frith. The album is a collection of film music composed and performed by Frith, and is the third of three Eye to Ear albums dedicated to his work for short films. It was recorded in Germany and the United States in 2003 and 2004.

Eye to Ear III comprises two suites, Troja Suite from Hussi Kutulcan's 2005 film Drei Gegen Troja (Three Against Troy), and Water Music from Deborah Kauffman and Alan Snitow's 2004 documentary, Thirst.

== Track listing ==
All tracks composed by Fred Frith.

Troja Suite
No.	Title	Length
1.	"Love Parade"	3:28
2.	"The Wedding"	2:13
3.	"Crossing the Bosporus"	4:22
4.	"Inside Outside"	3:23
5.	"The Wedding (Catwalk Remix)"	2:54
6.	"The Prisoners Confined"	2:48
7.	"The Prisoners Released"	2:06
8.	"Escape of Our Heroes"	2:08
9.	"Once Upon a Time in Anatolia (for Ennio Morricone)"	4:17
10.	"Redemption (for Edward Artemiev)"	4:51
11.	"Drei Gegen Troja"	4:16

Water Music
No.	Title	Length
1.	"Water Music 1"	4:36
2.	"Water Music 2"	4:21
3.	"Water Music 3"	3:19
4.	"Water Music 4"	1:51
5.	"Water Music 5"	4:39

== Personnel ==
- Fred Frith – guitar, bass guitar, keyboards, home-made instruments
- Wu Fei – gu zheng
- Ada Gosling – violin (Troja Suite)
- Bernd Settelmeyer – percussion, waterphone (Troja Suite)
- Tilman Müller – trumpet, flugelhorn (Troja Suite)
- Carla Kihlstedt – violin, nyckelharpa (Water Music)
- Sheela Bringi – bansuri (Water Music)
- Heather Heise – melodica, piano (Water Music)
- Gino Robair – percussion (Water Music)

=== Sound and artwork ===
Water Music recorded at Guerrilla Recordings in Oakland, California, June and November 2003; Troja Suite recorded at Jankowski SoundFabrik in Esslingen, Germany, July 2004

- Myles Boisen – engineer (Water Music), audio mixer
- Peter Hardt – engineer (Troja Suite)
- Fred Frith – producer
- Heike Liss – photographer
