= Giovanni Amighetti =

Contemporary Italian musician (born 1971)

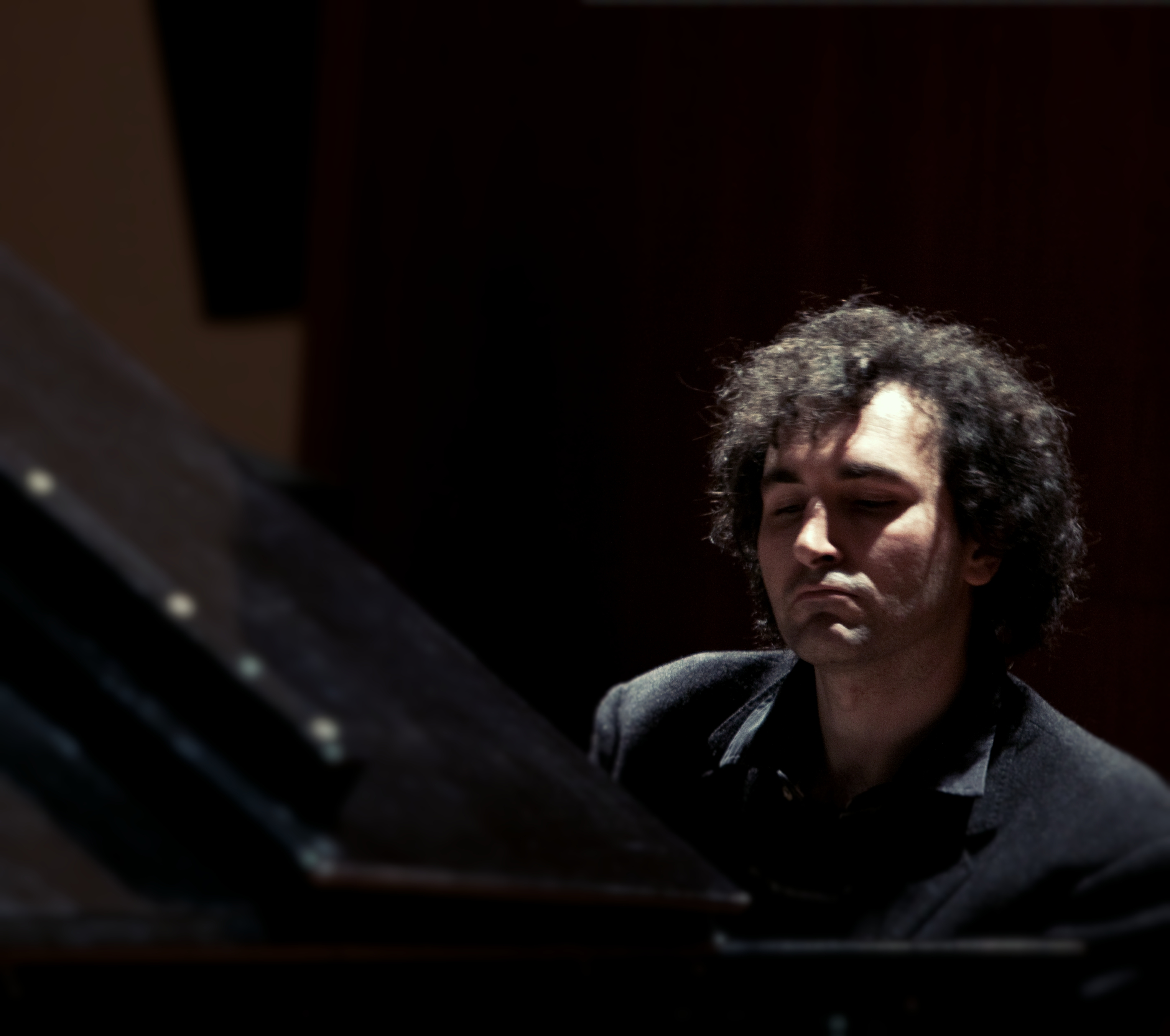
- Amighetti playing for Nintendo. Photo by Elisa Caldana. ©Arvmusic

Background information
- Born: 21 February 1971 (age 55); Parma, Italy
- Origin: Italy
- Genre: Contemporary
- Occupations: Musician and composer
- Instrument: Keyboards

Giovanni Amighetti (born 21 February 1971 in Parma, Italy) is an Italian contemporary musician.

He studied classical piano and began playing with avantgarde band Fondamenta and AREA drummer Giulio Capiozzo in late eighties. With the world music boom he started promoting in Italy some of the Real World recording label artists. His first world music CD production is "No, Russia cannot be perceived by wit" by Terem Quartet, realised by Schott Musik/Intuition in 1999. Then he worked on many studio and live projects, often collaborating with musicians from Mari Boine Band (Gjermund Silset, Helge Norbakken, Roger Ludvigsen).

Among others: "Salimie" with Ayub Ogada, "La voce del mondo" with Tiziana Ghiglioni and "Anastasia" with Vladimir Denissenkov.

In 1996 he played with Ayub Ogada in front of an audience of 500.000 by the Colosseum in Rome for FAO

He is an honorary citizen of Santa Cruz, California.

In contemporary music also worked on some solo and Fondamenta projects, with Union Nowhere, on Guido Ponzini's cd "Twilight town" and with the Shan Qi ensemble featuring Chinese flute player Guo Yue. Produced Wu Fei's "A Distant Youth" in 2007, featuring Fred Frith, Carla Kihlstedt and Helge A. Norbakken. He is also engaged in multimedia productions merging music and interactive digital media with Arvmusic.

In 2009 worked with Adel Salameh and Naziha Azzouz for "Dardasha" and with Nintendo for the Wii Music Live gigs, in 2010 he has been main producer for historical work "La musica di Secondo Casadei" by Casadei Sonora. In 2012 he recorded "windy valley" with Morricone-related classical players using a rig of old ARP, Prophet and Moog synthesizers.

Amighetti has collaborated with Nasa/JPL scientist Michele Vallisneri in "Tales from the Cosmos" and played in and produced new album by Bernardi with Skunk Anansie guitarist Martin Kent (Ace) and Michael Urbano.

In 2015 is out his produced CD by Faris Amine "Mississippi to Sahara" for Reaktion/Wrasse Records, which is research upon the origins of blues music in the Tuareg tradition. Nominee as best fusion album in 2016 by Songlines and awarded as one of 10 all-time best Tuareg records.

Giovanni also played in another JPL related work with English guitarist David Rhodes (guitarist) (Peter Gabriel), Jeff Coffin (Dave Matthews Band), Wu Fei, Paolo Vinaccia and Roger Ludvigsen called "The Fermi Paradox". Also in 2015 is his production meeting by Officina Zoe and Mari Boine for "La notte della Taranta".

In 2018 he recorded piano and synths for "A classical improvisation" a contemporary classical concept of creating music directly in the studio sessions together with Tiziana Ghiglioni and Angela Benelli. Also worked live with percussionists Sidiki Camara and Trilok Gurtu, composer Ray Lema and as guest with L'orchestra Popolare La Notte della Taranta directed by Daniele Durante.

In 2020 during the COVID-19 pandemic he helped in bringing Daniele Durante's Taranta project to the Castello Sforzesco in Milano for the sole gig of the ensemble that year. He was also musician and artistic coordinator for the Italy for China music and video recording in Teatro Asioli Correggio – Ahymé Festival with Daniele Durante, Franco Mussida Premiata Forneria Marconi, Moreno Conficconi – Venice Film Festival Siae prize winner.

In 2021 Amighetti recorded and released the album "Play@Esagono vol.1" with guitarist Luca Nobis and various guests including Jeff Coffin from Dave Matthews Band, Petit Solo Diabate and Fiorenzo Tassinari. The album has been followed by a serie of eleven live videos filmed by director Luca Fabbri.

In June 2021 he was producer and musician for the collaboration between Daniele Durante Taranta and the Deutsche Kammerphilharmonie Bremen for Summer in Lesmona.

In 2022 and 2023, Giovanni Amighetti collaborated with Luca Nobis on the E-Wired Empathy project, releasing the album E-Wired Empathy featuring guests like Gabin Dabiré, Valerio Combass, and Jeff Coffin. During this time, they performed in various gigs and made media appearances to promote the project.

In 2024, E-Wired Empathy expanded to a six-member band, bringing in drummer Roberto Gualdi, bassist Valerio Combass, singer Stefania Morciano from Salento, and clarinetist Moreno Conficconi. They released the EP E-Wired Empathy Meets Gasandji and contributed to the recording of Romagna 2.0, an album by Moreno Il Biondo.

Giovanni Amighetti also co-produced both albums with Alessandro Marcantoni. In September 2024, E-Wired Empathy reunited for a live performance featuring English guitarist David Rhodes, marking a special highlight for the expanded lineup.

== Selected discography ==
- 1999: No, Russia Cannot Be Perceived by wit – Terem Quartet – (Intuition) producer
- 2000: Tanguru Salimie – Ayub Ogada, Roger Ludvigsen, Giovanni Amighetti, Gjermund Silset, Helge Norbakken – (Intuition)
- 2001: La Voce del Mondo – Tiziana Ghiglioni, Ludvigsen, Giovanni Amighetti, Gjermund Silset, Helge Norbakken, Meola – (Arv)
- 2001: Anastasia – Vladimir Denissenkov, Silset, Norbakken, Amighetti – (Arv)
- 2002: The Beautiful High Coast – Alf Haggkvist – (Arv) executive producer
- 2003 And if the world... – Giovanni Amighetti, Laura Love, Joji Hirota, Guo Yue, Ayub Ogada, Helge Norbakken, Annbjorg Lien, Adel Salameh (Iamedia)
- 2006: Twilight Town – Guido Ponzini, Guo Yue, Amighetti, Cottifogli, Meola – (Ozella Music)
- 2007: A Distant Youth – Wu Fei, Fred Frith, Carla Kihlstedt, Helge A. Norbakken – (Forrest Hill) producer
- 2009: Shan Qi / Energy of the Mountains – Guo Yue, Giovanni Amighetti, Wu Fei, Ponzini, Helge Norbakken – (Ozella Music)
- 2010: Plugin Contemporary Music – Guido Ponzini, Angela Benelli, Gambini, Amighetti – (Porter Records)
- 2011: La Musica di Secondo Casadei – Conficconi, Tassinari, Benelli, Vallicelli – (Arv-Casadei Sonora) producer
- 2012: Dardasha – Adel Salameh, Naziha Azzouz, Amighetti, Ponzini, Fulvio Maras – (Arv)
- 2012: Windy Valley – Claudio Ferrarini, Giovanni Amighetti, Andreoli, Benelli, Ponzini, Meola – (Arte Sonora)
- 2015: Mississippi to Sahara – Faris Amine, Leo Welch – (Wrasse) producer
- 2017: Re-Birth – Pier Bernardi, Ace, Giovanni Amighetti, Michael Urbano – (Irma Records)
- 2018: A classical improvisation – Giovanni Amighetti, Tiziana Ghiglioni, Angela Benelli, Pier Bernardi (Muki)
- 2021: Incontri sul Palco – Giovanni Amighetti, Moreno Conficconi, Franco Mussida, Daniele Durante (video – Esagono)
- 2021: Play@Esagono vol.1 – Giovanni Amighetti, Luca Nobis, Petit Solo Diabate, Jeff Coffin, Fiorenzo Tassinari, Valerio "Combass" Bruno (Esagono Dischi – Bollettino)
- 2023: E-Wired Empathy – Giovanni Amighetti, Luca Nobis, Gabin Dabire, Jeff Coffin, Valerio "Combass" Bruno (Esagono Dischi)
- 2024: E-Wired Empathy feat. Gasandji – Giovanni Amighetti, Luca Nobis, Gasandji, Roberto Gualdi, Valerio "Combass" Bruno, Moreno Conficconi, Giulio Bianco (Arvmusic)
- 2024: Romagna 2.0 – Moreno Il Biondo, Giovanni Amighetti, Luca Nobis, Roberto Gualdi, Valerio "Combass" Bruno, Stefania Morciano, Giulio Bianco, E-Wired Empathy (Arvmusic)
- 2025: The Fermi Paradox – David Rhodes, Giovanni Amighetti, Jeff Coffin, Roger Ludvigsen, Paolo Vinaccia, Wu Fei, Gabin Dabire, E-Wired Empathy (Arvmusic)
- 2025: The Circle - Live – E-Wired Empathy, David Rhodes, Peter Tickell, Moreno Il Biondo, Stefania Morciano, Giulio Bianco, Giovanni Amighetti (Arvmusic)
- 2026: The Circle - Live - Folk Songs – Moreno Il Biondo, E-Wired Empathy, David Rhodes, Peter Tickell, Stefania Morciano, Riccardo Tesi, Giovanni Amighetti (Arvmusic)
