= Joji Hirota =

Japanese taiko drummer, percussionist and composer (1948–2026)

Joji Hirota 廣田 丈自
- Born: 1948; Otaru, Hokkaido, Allied-occupied Japan
- Died: 6 September 2026 (aged 78) London, England
- Genres: taiko, Japanese folk
- Occupations: Percussionist, composer, singer
- Instruments: Taiko, shakuhachi, percussion, vocals
- Years active: 1970s to 2026
- Labels: Real World Records, ARC Music, Saydisc Records, Inner City Records
- Website: jojihirota.com

Joji Hirota (廣田 丈自, Hirota Jōji) (1948 – 6 September 2026) was a Japanese percussionist, composer and singer based in London. He played taiko and shakuhachi and led the group Joji Hirota and the London Taiko Drummers.

Born in Otaru, Hokkaido, Hirota joined Stomu Yamashta's Red Buddha Theatre in 1972 and settled in England after its tours. He became music director of the Lindsay Kemp company in 1977 and recorded for Real World Records and ARC Music. His taiko playing appears on the soundtracks of Silence, Isle of Dogs and Ghost of Tsushima.

== Early life ==
Hirota was born in Otaru on the island of Hokkaido. His father sang folk songs as a hobby, and gave him a child-sized shakuhachi when he was five. Hirota played in a fife and drum band at primary school and in brass bands at junior high and high school, adding timpani and cymbals to the recorder and drums he already knew. He began formal percussion study at eleven and composed his first pieces at thirteen.

His drumming teacher was Itto Ohba, a taiko master from Hokkaido. Hirota said that Ohba told him not to copy his teacher's style and to build his own music on what he had been taught.

Hirota took up the piano in his final year of high school to prepare for music college. He entered the Kyoto City University of Arts, then named Kyoto Municipal University of Arts, and left in his fourth year to take up professional work.

== Career ==
=== Red Buddha Theatre and Lindsay Kemp company ===
In the summer of his fourth year at university, a senior contact introduced Hirota to Stomu Yamashta, who was bringing his Red Buddha Theatre production to the festival at Avignon. The show then toured France, the United Kingdom and the United States, and its London run set a box office record. Hirota became the company's music director and percussionist. He is credited with claves and vocals on a 1972 recording of the company's music. Hirota later said that without Yamashta's invitation he might have stayed with the Nagoya Philharmonic Orchestra for the rest of his career.

After about two and a half years abroad he returned to Japan. British musicians he had met in London then visited Japan and worked with him, and this led him back to London. In 1977 he became music director and solo percussionist of the Lindsay Kemp company, which toured Europe, the Americas and Japan. He wrote and performed the music for the company's production Onnagata, which won the Time Out award for best dance company in 1991.

=== Solo work and collaborations ===
Hirota played at WOMAD festivals from 1986, both as a solo percussionist and with the Chinese flautist Guo Yue. In 1991 he formed the trio Trísan with Guo Yue and Pól Brennan of Clannad. The group toured Europe, Canada, the United States and Japan, and its first album, released in November 1992, received a nomination from Tower Records in New York for best contemporary instrumental album.

With the former Genesis guitarist Anthony Phillips, Hirota wrote and performed music for Anglia Television's Survival wildlife programmes, and the pair also produced library music. Their work was later collected on the album Wildlife. Hirota also formed a percussion duo with Pete Lockett called Taiko to Tabla, which recorded a live concert at the Bruges Festival in February 1998.

In 1999 Hirota began working with the London Metropolitan Orchestra and made the album The Gate for Real World Records. EMI Japan issued a Japanese edition in 2002, and he toured Japan with the orchestra's string ensemble. He played a solo set at Expo 2000 in Hanover, and in 2001 toured the United Kingdom as part of the Japan UK Festival with the project Tozai. In 2006 he toured Britain and Europe with the JJK Project alongside John Kaizan Neptune and Kenny Endo.

Around 2000 Hirota played percussion for the Royal Shakespeare Company and co-composed the music for its production of Macbeth.

=== Joji Hirota and the London Taiko Drummers ===
Hirota founded his taiko group in the 1980s. It has been billed as Joji Hirota and Hiten Ryu Daiko, Joji Hirota and the Taiko Drummers and Joji Hirota and the London Taiko Drummers. In Britain he often played with Mark Alcock and James Barrow. Alcock later formed the group Taiko Meantime and has described the period from 1994 to 2004 as the time he played with Hirota.

The group opened the Live Earth concert at Wembley Stadium on 7 July 2007. Organisers assembled a large ensemble of drummers from different traditions for the show, and a preview in pipes|drums listed Hirota among them alongside Roger Taylor of Queen and members of the Foo Fighters. The group also opened the 2008 London ceremony for the 60th anniversary of Amnesty International, and it performed at a business awards ceremony attended by the Prince of Wales.

As part of Japanese government arts projects in 2007 the group travelled to Saudi Arabia, Oman and the United Arab Emirates. Its later tours have included Israel and parts of Africa. In London, Hirota closed the Japan Matsuri festival, which drew about 70,000 people, with taiko, shakuhachi and folk singing. A review in the Botswana newspaper The Guardian Sun described a 2016 performance at a drum festival presented by the Japanese embassy there, where the group played Hokkai, a piece Hirota wrote in tribute to his teacher Itto Ohba and Ohba's son Kazuoki.

The group released the albums Japanese Drums in 2009, with a five-piece line-up named Hiten Ryu Daiko, and Japanese Taiko in 2016. A review from the Japan Society in London described the second as rooted in natural themes and cinematic in feel.

=== Tōhoku earthquake response ===
After the 2011 Tōhoku earthquake and tsunami, Hirota created the production Beyond the Requiem and gave charity concerts built on his arrangements of folk songs from the Tōhoku region. He toured three prefectures in northeast Japan with the London Metropolitan Orchestra, whose director is Andy Brown, in a concert series that included the Hokkaido folk song Esashi Oiwake. He gave annual commemorative concerts with the orchestra and the London Taiko Drummers. His 2013 album Japanese Folk Songs II contains nine pieces connected to the Tōhoku region.

=== Later work ===
In 2020 Hirota produced the album Taiko Do for the Italian taiko group KyoShinDo. In 2021 he released Prayer's Tale, on which he plays taiko, bells, gongs, shakuhachi and music boxes and sings. Audio Network also carries his music in its production music catalogue.

== Film, television and game work ==
Hirota's taiko and shakuhachi playing has been used in several film and game scores. Music by Hirota was placed in films such as The Last Samurai, 47 Ronin and Martin Scorsese's Silence (2016).

For Isle of Dogs, Hirota was one of the taiko players on the Alexandre Desplat score. The taiko player Kaoru Watanabe, who performed on the soundtrack, invited Hirota to join him at the film's Berlin Film Festival premiere.

For Ghost of Tsushima Hirota led a three-player taiko ensemble at AIR Studios in London, with Eri Kaishima and Yoshinori Hayashi.

== Honours ==
- 1991: Time Out award for best dance company, for the Lindsay Kemp company's Onnagata, for which he wrote and performed the music.
- 1993: Nomination from Tower Records, New York, for the first Trísan album.
- 2004: Ambassador's commendation from the Japanese Embassy in London, for his contribution to Japanese musical activity outside Japan.
- 2012: Commendation from the emperor and empress of Japan for his work overseas.

== Death ==
Hirota died on 6 September 2026 in London.

== Discography ==
=== Albums ===
Year	Title	Label	Notes
1976	Sahasurara		Released as George Hirota
1981	The Wheel of Fortune	Inner City Records	
1990	Rain Forest Dream	Saydisc Records	
1993	Travelogues 4	Atmosphere	With Anthony Phillips
1994	Red Ribbon	Riverboat Records	With Guo Yue
1997	Missing Links Volume 3: Time and Tide	Blueprint	With Anthony Phillips
1999	The Gate	Real World Records	Japanese edition on EMI Japan, 2002
1999	Nature + Wildlife (The Natural World)	Themes International Music	With Anthony Phillips
2002	Taiko to Tabla: Live at the Bruges Festival 1998		With Pete Lockett
2004	Taiko to Tabla	ARC Music	With Pete Lockett
2007	Japanese Folk Songs	ARC Music	
2008	Masters of Percussion	ARC Music	With Hossam Ramzy, Sarwar Sabri and Emmanuel Tagoe
2009	Japanese Drums	ARC Music	With Hiten Ryu Daiko
2013	Japanese Folk Songs II	ARC Music	
2016	Japanese Taiko	ARC Music	With the London Taiko Drummers
2020	Taiko Do		Producer, for KyoShinDo
2021	Prayer's Tale	ARC Music	

=== Compilation ===
- Wildlife (with Anthony Phillips)

== Selected stage, screen and game credits ==
Year	Title	Type	Contribution
1972	The Man from the East (Red Buddha Theatre)	Stage / recording	Claves and vocals
1991	Onnagata (Lindsay Kemp company)	Dance theatre	Composer and performer
c. 2000	Macbeth (Royal Shakespeare Company)	Stage	Percussionist and co-composer
2003	The Last Samurai	Film	Recorded music
2013	47 Ronin	Film	Recorded music
2016	Silence	Film	Music featured
2018	Isle of Dogs	Film	Taiko
2020	Ghost of Tsushima	Video game	Led taiko ensemble
n.d.	Survival (Anglia Television)	Television	Music, with Anthony Phillips
