= Clearing Customs =

Studio album by Fred Frith
- Released: February 2011
- Recorded: November–December 2007
- Studio: SWR studio 1, Baden-Baden and Saarbrücken, Germany
- Genre: Jazz; free improvisation
- Length: 67:50
- Label: Intakt

Fred Frith chronology
Eye to Ear III (2010)	Clearing Customs (2011)	Angels on the Edge of Time (2015)

External image
- SWR New Jazz Meeting featuring Fred Frith – Clearing Customs, November 2007 by Walter Layher

Clearing Customs is a studio album by English guitarist, composer and improvisor Fred Frith. It is based on a week of recordings and performances in November and December 2007 at a New Jazz Meeting at SWR, a radio station in southwest Germany. Two hour-long national broadcasts were made. The album was released by Intakt Records in February 2011.

The music is based on a 75-minute composition by Frith, and improvised by all the performers. It uses a "graphic structural model" that links "diverse types of musical events" on a time line. Traditional jazz instruments were used, plus Asian guzheng and tablas, and electronics. Frith drew on English theatre maker Peter Brook's approach of bringing together performers from completely different cultural backgrounds.

According to Frith, a key aspect of the music is the fact that the performers were meeting for the first time. He reflected: "The expression 'clearing customs' had multiple meanings for me – 'crossing borders', of course, but also 'getting rid of old habits', and also 'the things you do when you have space around you'. It was playful and deep at the same time, and those musicians were and are amazing."

== Reception ==
Professional ratings
Review scores
Source	Rating
All About Jazz	4/5 stars

In a review for All About Jazz, Nic Jones wrote: "An unusual instrumentation enhances the singularity of the single hour-long title piece, and the deployment is something else... Frith has always maintained an interest in longer forms, despite the brevity shown by much of his music on record. Clearing Customs summarizes this interest, but for him—and indeed his fellow performers on this record—the journey continues."

Writing for Point of Departure, Art Lange commented: "As the musicians co-inhabit segments of time they create a cross-talk of rhythms and styles; brief echoes of Japanese, Chinese, and Korean court musics and lyrical folk songs emerge and recede, with the ensemble thickening and thinning out to sustain momentum. There are moments of tension, of tranquility, of aridity. But the strongest impression that the music makes, and the clue that Frith has succeeded at his goal, is that this sounds not like the result of a single vision, but rather of a true ensemble – a cohesive community of effort."

The New York City Jazz Record's Marc Medwin stated: "Despite numerous layers, there is never a sense of clutter, as there is with so many pieces where samples and live instruments coexist. The album's title is apt. As... diatonic music returns to end the work, there is a sense of circularity, but the road traveled has also been winding; there is a feeling that the slate has been wiped clean, all customs cleared and a new music created."

== Track listing ==
All tracks composed by Fred Frith.

1. "Clearing Customs" – 67:50

Source: Discogs

== Personnel ==
- Fred Frith – guitar, home-made instruments
- Wu Fei – guzheng
- Anantha Krishnan – mridangam, tablas
- Marque Gilmore – drums, electronics
- Tilman Müller – trumpet
- Patrice Scanlon – electronics
- Daniela Cattivelli – electronics

Source: Intakt Records

=== Sound and artwork ===
Recorded at SWR studio 1 in Baden-Baden, Germany on November 29, 2007, and in Saarbrücken, Germany on December 1, 2007.

- Wolfgang Bachner – recording engineer
- Alfred Habelitz – sound engineer
- Fred Frith – mixing, liner notes
- Manfred Seiler – mixing
- Manfred Seiler – mastering
- Reinhard Kager – liner notes
- Heike Liss – cover art
- Jonas Schoder – graphic design

Source: Intakt Records
