= Lusheng =

Bamboo mouthorgan of Hmong people

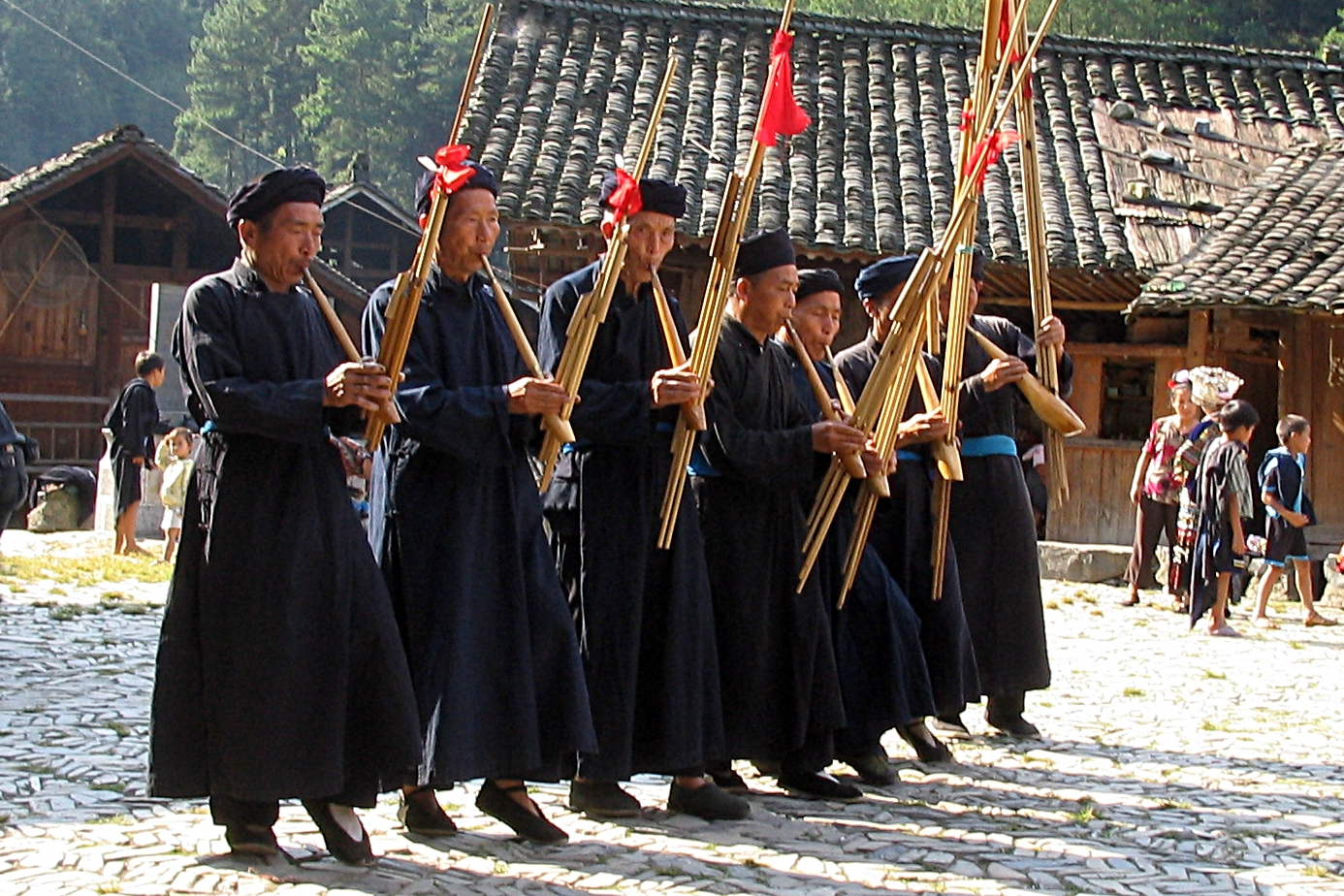
Hmong musicians from Guizhou perform on lusheng in a variety of sizes

The lusheng (simplified Chinese: 芦笙; traditional Chinese: 蘆笙; pinyin: lú shēng, pronounced [lǔʂə́ŋ]; Vietnamese: Khèn Mông; also spelled lu sheng; spelled ghengx in standard Hmong and qeej in Laotian RPA Hmong) is a Hmong musical instrument. It has a long history of 3000 years in China, traced back to the Tang Dynasty. It is a mouth organ with multiple bamboo pipes, each fitted with a free reed, which are fitted into a long blowing tube made of hardwood. It most often has five or six pipes of different pitches and is thus a polyphonic instrument. Its construction includes six parts (mouthpiece, air feed pipe, sheng dou (笙斗; "body"), sheng guan (笙管; "pipes"), reed, and resonator tube). It comes in sizes ranging from very small to several meters in length.

The lusheng is used primarily in the rural regions of southwestern China (e.g. Guizhou, Guangxi, and Yunnan) and in nearby countries such as Laos and Vietnam, where it is played by such ethnic groups as the Miao (Hmong-Hmyo-Hmao-Hmu-Xong) and Dong. The lusheng has special cultural significance in the Miao regions due to its role in marriage and religious ceremonies. At the lusheng festival (September 27–29), performers often dance or swing the instrument from side to side while playing. Since the late 20th century, a modernized version of the instrument has been used in compositions, often as a solo instrument. The lusheng production technique has been recorded in China's State-Level Non-Material Cultural Heritage List since May 20, 2006.

== History ==
The lusheng can be traced back to the Tang Dynasty with a history of 3000 years in China. It is originated from the Central Plains Region of China. After spreading to the rural regions of southwestern China, lusheng became one of the favorite traditional instruments in several Chinese minority ethnic groups (in particular, the Miao, Yao, Dong, and Yi). It is believed to have evolved from the Yu (wind instrument), which is a free-reed wind instrument originated in the Han nationality.

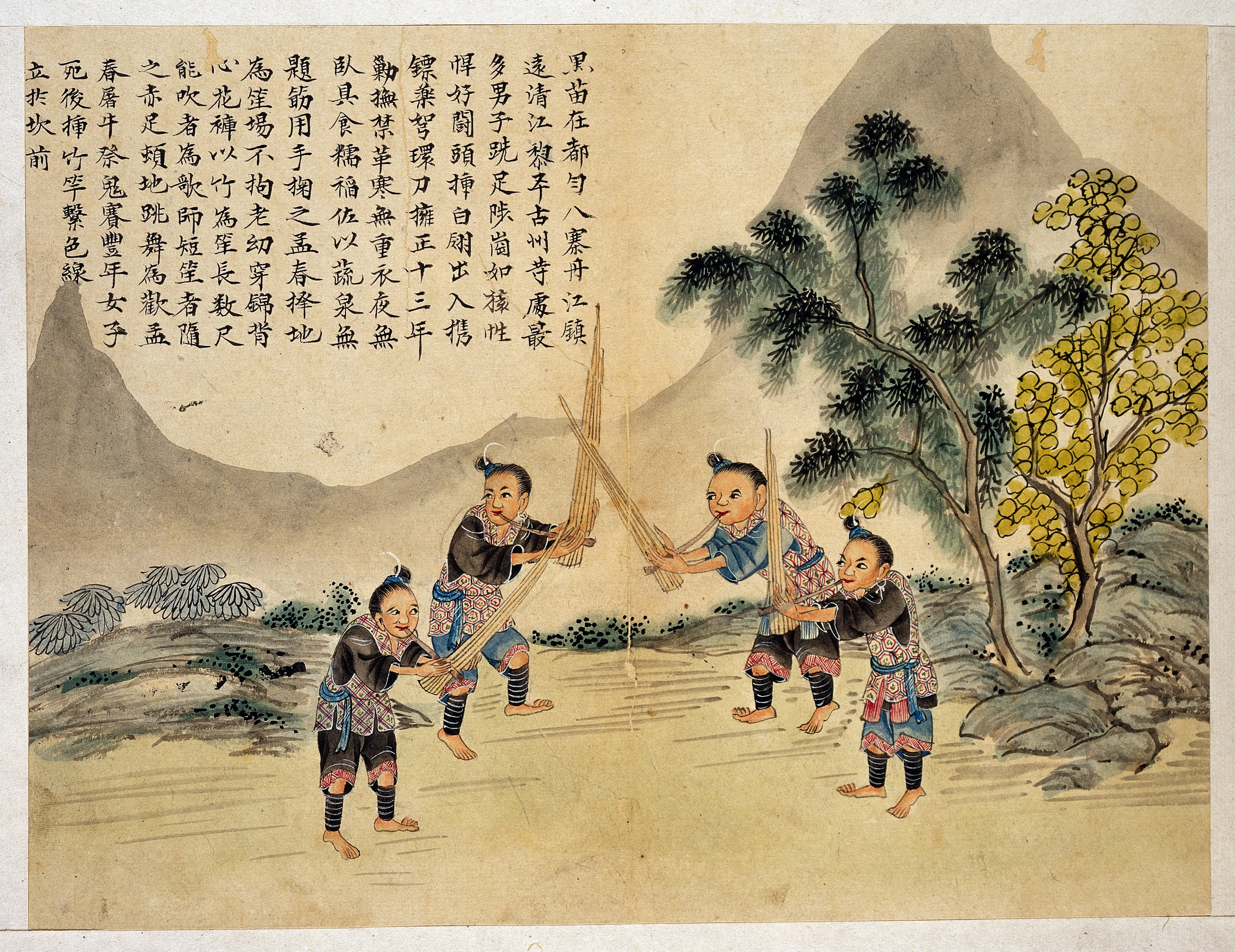
A drawing of ancient Miao people playing lusheng

In the Miao region, there is a folk legend about the origin of the lusheng. According to the legend, the world had nine suns in ancient times that caused heavy drought. People struggled to survive and built huge bows and arrows, shooting down eight of the nine suns. This scared the last sun, which kept itself hidden in the clouds. Without the sunshine, there was always night and crops failed to grow. To induce the last sun to come out, people produced the lusheng and played music. The beautiful melody from the lusheng successfully attracted the sun to come out again. After that, playing lusheng became a tradition and cultural expression of the Miao people.

=== Modern development of lusheng ===
On May 20, 2006, the production techniques on lusheng of the Miao nationality group was approved by China State Council and listed in the State-Level Non-Material Cultural Heritage List. The production techniques used to produce the lusheng advanced techniques of reed musical instruments production in ancient China, connecting Chinese Miao and other Miao ethnic groups around the world.

== Construction ==
A traditional lusheng consists of six parts: mouthpiece, air feed pipe, sheng dou, sheng guan, reed, and resonator tube. The mouthpiece is thin bamboo, which is connected to the air feed pipe and the sheng dou; six bamboo-made sheng guan of different lengths and with reeds at the bottom are inserted into the sheng dou, each of which has a press hole and is equipped with a bamboo resonator tube at the upper or lower end of the different bamboo pipes.

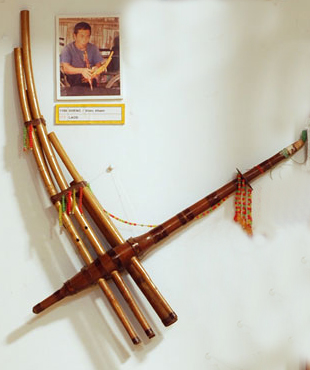
The traditional lusheng with pentatonic scale

=== Sheng dou ===
The sheng dou (笙斗), which is also called a gas box, is the body of the lusheng. It is mostly made of cedar, pine or wu tong (梧桐) wood. It has a spindle shape, with 46~56 cm in length, 4 ~ 9 cm in width, and 3.5 ~ 8 cm in height. During the production, a whole piece of blank material is split into two halves, and each inner chamber will be hollowed out respectively. Then two halves will be glued after loading into the sheng guan with seven turns of thin gabions around the outer part. The sheng dou is often light yellow, decorated with tung oil on the outside. Its beautiful appearance made lusheng has the reputation of "golden sheng".

=== Sheng guan ===
The pipes (sheng guan) are mostly made out of white bamboo, which has a thin diameter (1.2 cm), long joints (40~50 cm), uniform thickness, and thin walls. They are inserted longitudinally at an angle of 75° to 90° into the sheng dou. The height of sheng guan varied based on a different level of tones: soprano lusheng is 14.5 cm ~ 30 cm high, alto lusheng is 30 cm ~ 58 cm high, bass lusheng is 58 cm ~ 105 cm high, times bass lusheng is 105 cm ~ 210 cm high.

=== Reed ===
Reed is the soundbox of lusheng, mostly is made from ringing copper. Its size varies depending on the pitch: The pitch of c, c1, c2 has the length of 4 cm, 3.5 cm, 2.5 cm, and the width of 0.25 cm, 0.2 cm, 0.15 cm, respectively. The lusheng reed can also be made of brass, while it is not as crisp as the sound of copper.

=== Resonator tube ===
The resonator tube acts as the "microphone" of the lusheng. It is a bamboo tube set on the upper end of the sheng guan and is mostly made of Moso bamboo. Two types of resonator tube are used in the production, which is movable and fixed. Its length varied with different pitches: c, c1, c2 have length of 60 cm, 30 cm, 15 cm, respectively.

== Culture and festivals ==
=== In marriage ===
The lusheng plays an important role in pursuing love in Miao culture. Among traditional Miao (Hmong), intermarriage is prohibited between people of the same surname. Instead, Miao people usually choose their mates through collective activities. During annual spring farming periods, Miao people will build lusheng fields in Hmong villages as places for people to choose their spouses. In the lusheng fields, young men and women from different villages gather together, playing lusheng and dance to get to know each other. When a Miao man picks his mate, he will play lusheng songs like "asking for a flower belt" and ask for a love token from the woman.

=== In religion ===
In the Miao religion, they believe lusheng is a spiritual instrument (an animism belief) and has a certain effect on the gods. Between the beginning of spring and autumn harvest, lusheng playing is prohibited. During that period, Miao people will wipe the lusheng clean and tie it with red cloth, plugging the sheng guan with cotton flowers and placing it in the reed-pipe hall. Otherwise, it is believed that the sound of lusheng during harvest season will offend the gods. Violators are subject to reprimand by the elders of the tribe.

lusheng can be used in funerals, as its sound signifies death. In the funeral ceremony, Miao people will play lusheng to release the souls of dead people from suffering. They believe lusheng symbolizes a strong blood tie between the Miao people and their ancestors.

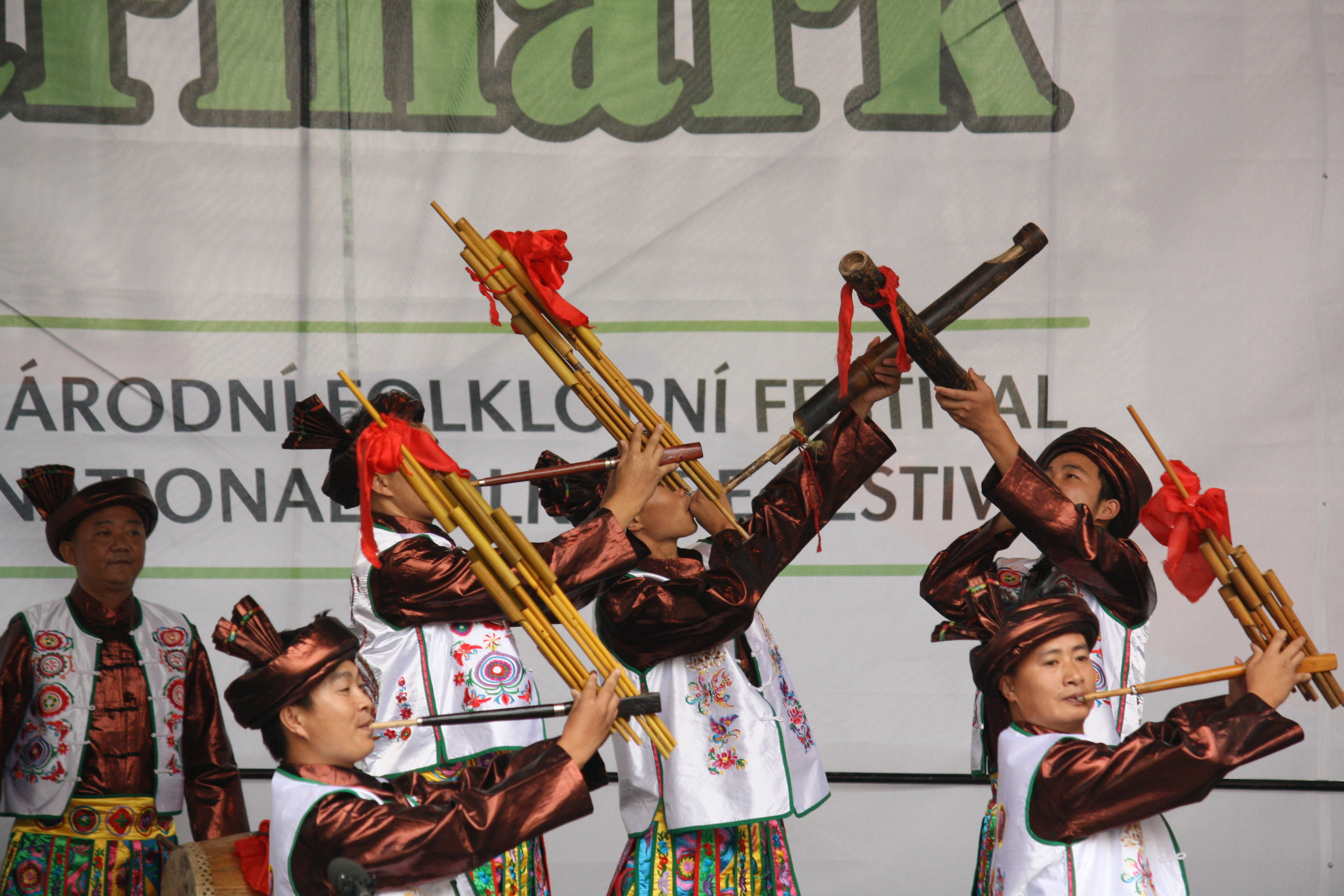
A team playing lusheng in a lusheng fair

=== Lusheng festival in Miao ===
Miao lusheng festival (also called lusheng fair) occurs on September 27 and lasts for three days. It has become a traditional festival with hundreds of thousands of Miao people participating. During the festival, a lusheng competition takes place among individuals and among teams composed of five people. They play lusheng music and dance in ritualized forms (lusheng dance). The players with more tunes and brighter sounds will win and their lusheng will be hung with red ribbons, as a symbol of honor in the village. Other activities also take place during lusheng festival to increase the jubilant atmosphere, including horse racing, bird-fighting, and cock fighting.

== See also ==
- Sheng (instrument)
- Khene
- Yu (wind instrument)
- Hulusheng
- Mangtong
- Music of China
- Traditional Chinese musical instruments
