= Helge Andreas Norbakken =

Norwegian drummer (born 1965)

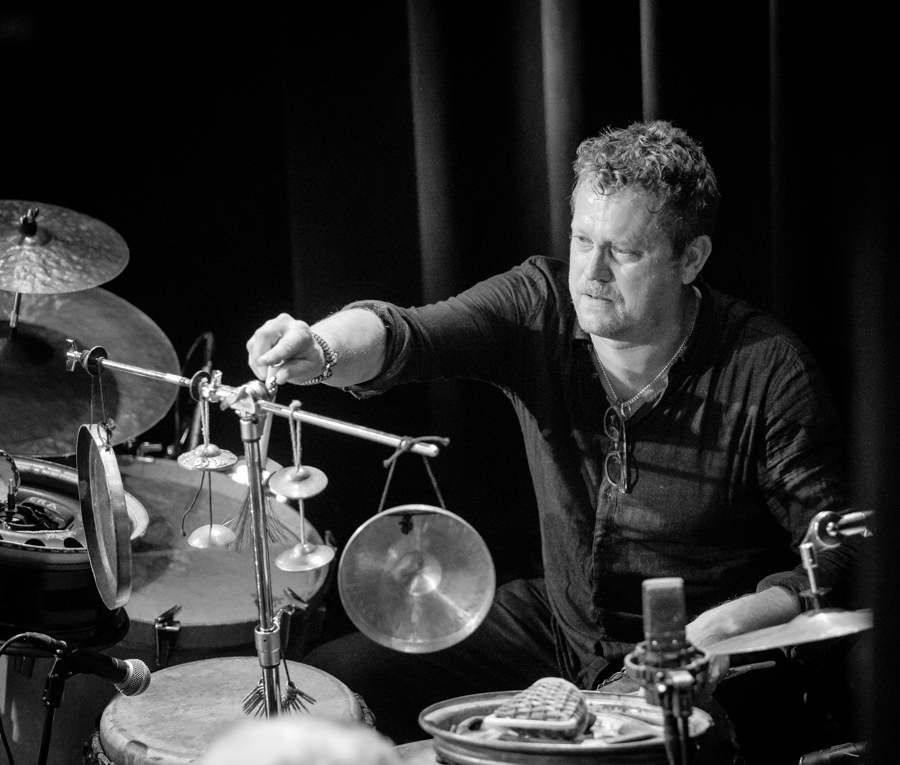
- Helge Andreas Norbakken performing in 2017

Background information
- Born: 1965 (age 60–61); Tromsø, Troms, Norway
- Genres: Jazz
- Occupations: Musician, composer
- Instrument: Drums
- Website: norbakken.no/helge

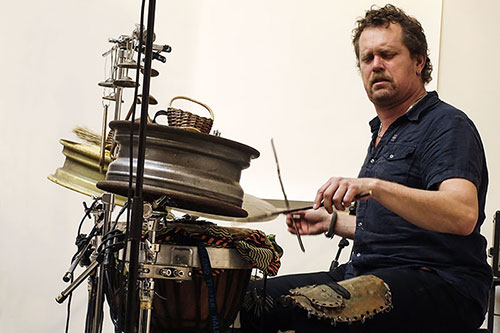
Helge Norbakken in Aarhus, Denmark 2015

Helge Andreas Norbakken (born 1965) is a Norwegian drummer known for his collaborations with Mari Boine, Jon Balke (MNO/Bathagraf/Siwan), Kari Bremnes, Maria Joao, Karl Seglem, Becaye Aw, Miki N'Doye, Jovan Pavlovic, and Anne Wylie. He is married to Dagrun Hjelleset Norbakken.

== Career ==
Norbakken is a graduate of the Jazz program at Trondheim Musikkonservatorium (1985–88), and is one of the most renowned Scandinavian percussionists. He started going on international venues within Mari Boine Band, and recorded Goaskjinvellja, Lehakastin, Ballvvoslatina, and live Eallin (1997) with her, then continued with Maria Joao, Jon Balke, Kari Bremnes, Ayub Ogada and an impressive list of Norwegian and international musicians.

After working with arvmusic on Mari Boine's tours, he recorded and played live with Ayub Ogada (in trio with Giovanni Amighetti and with a full big band including sound engineer Geir Ostensjo, Gjermund Silset, Giovanni Amighetti and Roger Ludvigsen), Vladimir Denissenkov, Tiziana Ghiglioni in "La voce del Mondo" and Guo Yue with Shan Qi. Norbakken developed a very original percussions style, based on sound research, hand-made instruments and original timbres merge. Everything go into strict multirythmical patterns those remember at the same moment Steve Reich, Philip Glass and Doudou N'Dyae Rose works... In studio he is a master in creating particular structures using (many) tracks and percussions over recordings.

== Discography (in selection) ==
With Frode Alnæs

- 2012: Envy The Man (Big Box Music)

With Jon Balke

- 2004: Diverted Travels (ECM), within Magnetic North Orchestra
- 2005: Statements (ECM), within Batagraf
- 2009: Siwan (ECM), within Siwan
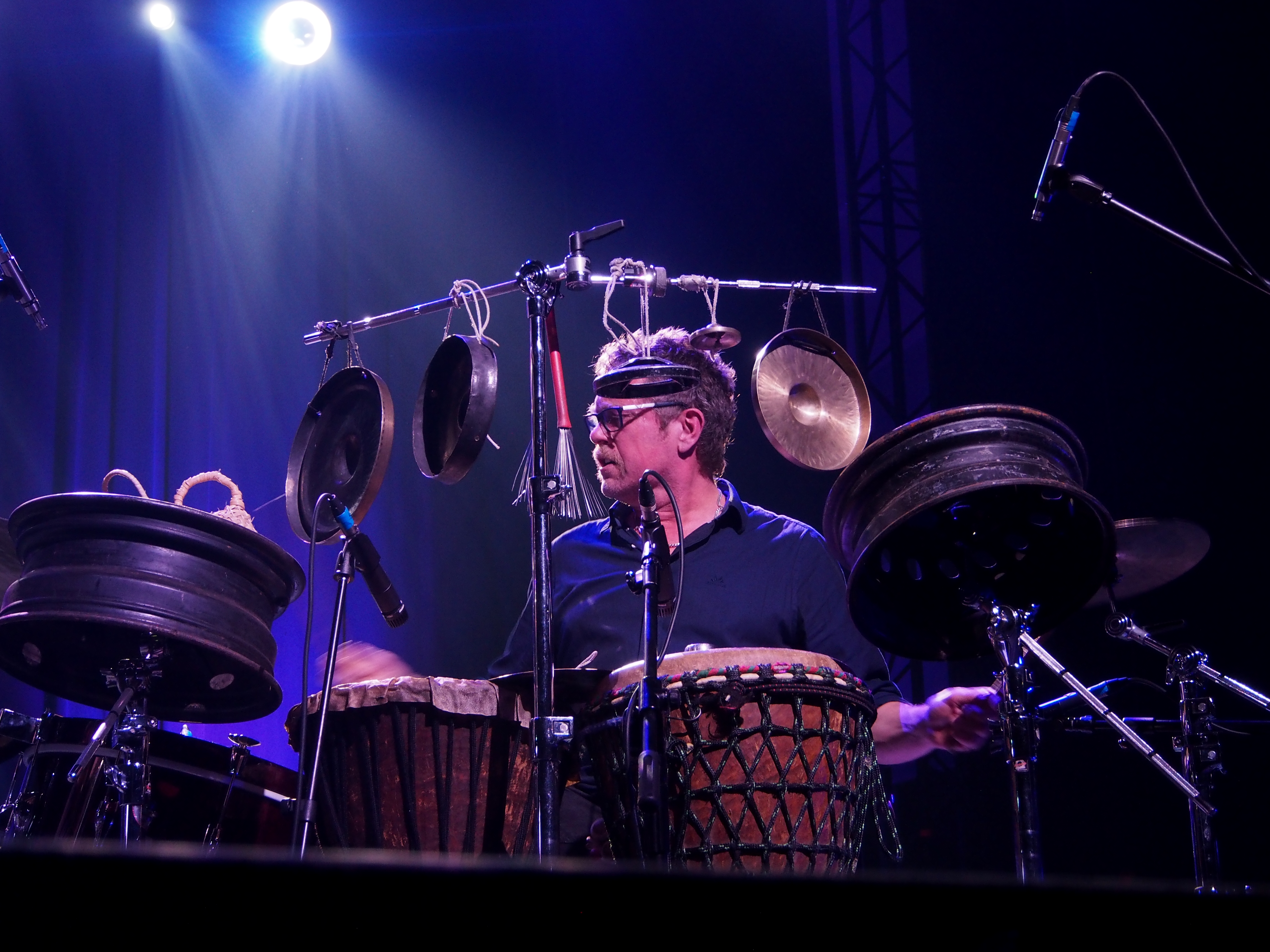
  Norbakken at Jazz nad Odrą in 2025
- 2011: Say And Play (ECM), within Batagraf

With Mari Boine

- 1993: Goaskinviellja – Ørnebror – Eagle brother (Lean)
- 1994: Leahkastin (Lean, Verve World)
- 1996: Radiant Warmth (Antilles)
- 1997: Eallin – Live (Antilles)
- 1998: Balvoslatnja – Room of Worship (Antilles)
- 2001: Winter in Moscow (Jaro Medien GmbH) feat. Inna Zhelannaya & Sergey Starostin

With Kari Bremnes

- 1998: Svarta Bjørn (Kirkelig Kulturverksted)
- 2001: Desemberbarn (Kirkelig Kulturverksted)
- 2005: Over en by (Reise) (Kirkelig Kulturverksted)
- 2007: Live (Reise) (Kirkelig Kulturverksted)
- 2009: Ly (Kirkelig Kulturverksted)
- 2012: Og Så Kom Resten Av Livet (Kirkelig Kulturverksted)

With Jon Hassell

- 2009: Last Night the Moon Came Dropping Its Clothes in the Street (ECM)

With Maria Joao & Mario Laginha

- 2000: Chorrinho Feliz (Verve)
- 2001: Mumadji (EmArcy)
- 2002: Undercovers (EmArcy, Universal)
- 2004: Tralha (Universal Portugal)
- 2009: Chocolate (Decca International)
- 2011: Follow the Songlines (Naive) with David Linx & Diederik Wissels

With Karl Seglem

- 2004: Femstein (NorCD)
- 2007: Urbs (NorCD)

With Trondheim Jazz Orchestra and Elin Rosseland

- 2014: Ekko (MNJ)

With Ann Wylie

- 2001: One And Two (Biber)
- 2003: Silver Apples of the Moon (Biber)
- 2008: Deep Waters (Biber)

With others

- 1987: Vol. IV (Studentersamfundets Plateselskap), within Bodega Band
- 1993: Shaken But Not Stirred (Curling Legs), with Palisander Kvartetten
- 1994: Langt nord I livet (Kirkelig Kulturverksted), with Erik Bye
- 1996: Hvit Pil, with Hege Rimestad
- 1997: PIP, with Steinar Ofsdal
- 1997: Salimie, with Ayub Ogada, Giovanni Amighetti, Gjermund Silset, Roger Ludvigsen (Intuition)
- 1997: Kuling I Skyggen (Bare Bra Musikk), with "Reiseradioen & Solskinnsgutta" (Gisle Børge Styve)
- 1998: La voce del mondo, with Tiziana Ghiglioni, Giovanni Amighetti, Roger Ludvigsen, Gjermund Silset (Arvmusic/IRD)
- 2000: Anastasia, with Vladimir Denissenkov, Gjermund Silset (Arvmusic/IRD)
- 2001: Floating Rhythms, with Terje Isungset
- 2001: Kråkeviks songbook, with Herborg Kråkevik
- 2003: A Dance with the Shadows (The Wild Places), with Tirill Mohn
- 2006: Tuki, with Miki N'Doye
- 2006: Into Paradise, with Sissel Kyrkjebø
- 2007: Urban Jive, with Olav Torget
- 2008: After a day of rain, with Benedicte Torget
- 2008: Magma, with Jan Gunnar Hoff
- 2008: Det er den draumen, with Sondre Bratland
- 2008: Rite, with Unni Løvlid
- 2008: Sviv, with Steinar Ofsdal
- 2008: PdPMH A/R (Naïve), with Laurence Revel
- 2008: Lysmannen, with Geirr Lystrup
- 2009: Æ Ror Aleina, with Tonje Unstad
- 2009: Sibi, within Becaye Aw
- 2009: Shan Qi, Energy of the mountains (DVD by Ozella music), with Guo Yue, Giovanni Amighetti, Wu Fei, Guido Ponzini
- 2009: Hildring, with Hildegunn Øiseth
- 2009: Piper on the Roof, with Elisabeth Vatn
- 2010: Arctic Cinema (iBoks), within No Border Orchestra
- 2010: Påskemorgen Slukker Sorgen (Gateway), with Lise Petersen
- 2012: Jeg Har Vel Ingen Kjærere (Plush Badger), with Anne Gravir Klykken
- 2012: Heilt Nye Vei (Ozella), with Elin Furubotn
- 2012: A Distant Youth (panai), with Wu Fei
