= Eye to Ear II =

Studio album by Fred Frith
- Released: 2004
- Recorded: 1997, 2001, Germany; 2002–2003, United States
- Genre: Experimental rock
- Length: 47:24
- Label: Tzadik (US)
- Producer: Fred Frith

Fred Frith chronology
Rivers and Tides (2003)	Eye to Ear II (2004)	What Leave Behind (2004)

Music for Film series chronology
Rivers and Tides (2003)	Eye to Ear II (2004)	Eye to Ear III (2010)

Professional ratings
Review scores
Source	Rating
AllMusic	3/5 stars

Eye to Ear II is a studio album by English guitarist, composer and improvisor Fred Frith. It is a collection of film music composed and performed by Frith, and is the second of three Eye to Ear albums dedicated to his work for short films. It was recorded in Germany and the United States between 1997 and 2003.

The music on Eye to Ear II appeared in the following films:

- Gambling, Gods and LSD (2002) by Peter Mettler
- Returning Home (2003) by Andy Abrahams Wilson
- Hirschen Mit Goldenen Hufen by Petra Mäussnest
- Sideshow by Kristin Varner

A modified version of the track "Gambling, Gods and LSD" also appeared on the soundtrack of the film of the same name, Gambling, Gods and LSD (2003) by various artists.

== Track listing ==
All tracks by Fred Frith except where noted.

1. "Sideshow 1" – 2:07
2. "Gambling, Gods and LSD" – 14:19
3. "Sideshow 2" – 2:26
4. "Hirschen Mit Goldenen Hufen" – 7:53
5. "Sideshow 3" – 2:19
6. "Returning Home: Wood and Water" – 8:34
7. "Returning Home: The Wind" (Frith, Wu Fei) – 4:11
8. "Returning Home: Straw Dance" – 3:17
9. "Sideshow 4" – 2:18

== Personnel ==
- Fred Frith – guitars, bass guitar, piano, keyboards, violin, accordion, ocarina, kalimba, drum samples, Mobius instruments, toys, low-grade sound effects, voice
- Gail Brand – trombone (5)
- Heather Heise – accordion (6–8)
- Wu Fei – gu zheng (6–8)
- Anne Hege – voice (6–8)
- Tracks 1,3,5 and 9 recorded at Guerrilla Recordings, Oakland, United States, January–February 2002
- Track 2 recorded at Jankowski Studio, Esslingen, Germany, July 2001
- Track 4 recorded at Ludwigsburg Film Akademie, Ludwigsburg, Germany, 1997
- Tracks 6–8 recorded at Mobius Music, San Francisco, United States, January 2003
- Myles Boisen – engineer
- Oliver di Cicco – engineer, instrument design, instrument technician
- Peter Hardt – engineer, compilation, editing
- Scott Hull – mastering
- Fred Frith – audio production, compilation
- Kazunori Sugiyama – associate producer
- John Zorn – executive producer
- Heike Liss – photography
- Heung-Heung "Chippy" Chin – design
