= Yu (wind instrument) =

Musical instrument

An illustration of two yu from the Complete Classics Collection of Ancient China (c. 1700–25)

The yu (Chinese: 竽; pinyin: yú) is a free reed wind instrument used in ancient China. It is similar to the sheng, with multiple bamboo pipes fixed in a wind chest which may be made out of bamboo, wood, or a gourd. Each pipe contains a free reed, which is also made of bamboo. Whereas the sheng is used to provide simultaneous tones in harmony (in fourths and fifths), the yu is played in single lines melodically. The instrument was used, often in large numbers, in court orchestras of ancient China (and was also exported to Korea and Japan) but is no longer used.

== History ==
Although the yu is now obsolete, it is known to most Chinese speakers through the saying Làn yú chōng shù (濫竽充數), meaning "to fill a position without having the necessary qualifications." The saying is derived from the story of Nanguo (南郭), a man who joined the royal court orchestra of King Xuan of Qi (宣王, 319 BC–300 BC), the ruler of the State of Qi (Shandong province) as a yu player. Although the man did not actually know how to play this instrument, he knew that the orchestra had no fewer than 300 yu players, so he felt secure that he could simply pretend to play, and thus collect a musician's salary. Upon the king's death, Nanguo was eventually exposed as an impostor when the king's son Min (湣王, 300 BC–283 BC), who had succeeded his father as king, requested that the musicians play individually rather than as an ensemble. On the night before he was to play, Nanguo fled the royal palace as he feared being punished for lying about his instrumental abilities, never to return.

== See also ==
- Traditional Chinese musical instruments
- Sheng (instrument)
- Lusheng
- Mangtong
