= Wildlife (Anthony Phillips and Joji Hirota album) =

Studio album by Anthony Phillips and Joji Hirota
- Released: 21 December 2007 (Japan); 21 April 2008 (UK)
- Recorded: 1994–2000
- Genre: Acoustic
- Labels: Arcangelo Records (Japan); Voiceprint Records (UK)
- Producers: Anthony Phillips, Joji Hirota

Anthony Phillips and Joji Hirota chronology
Field Day (2005)	Wildlife (2007)	Missing Links Volume IV: Pathways & Promenades (2009)

Wildlife is the second collaboration between Anthony Phillips and Joji Hirota. The album is culled from recordings made between 1994 and 2000 when Anthony and Joji collaborated on a number of soundtracks for wildlife television programmes in the British Survival series. In addition, Anthony also wrote and recorded the music for a programme in the BBC series Natural World.

Wildlife features selections from the music for the programmes Creatures of the Magic Water (tracks 1–6), Secrets of the Amazon (tracks 7–11), Jaguar: Eater of Souls (tracks 12–13), Serengeti Jigsaw (tracks 14–15), Web of the Spider Monkey (track 16), Dungeons & Dragons (tracks 17–22), Secrets of a Norfolk Wood (tracks 23–25), Bears of the Russian Front (tracks 26–30), Gremlins: Faces in the Forest (track 31), Jurassic Shark (tracks 32–38), and Midway - Island of Life (tracks 39–45).

All programmes represented come from the Survival series except "Midway - Island of Life" which comes from Natural World.

Several of the Survival programmes were filmed by the late Nick Gordon and the sleeve notes for the album include Ant's specially written tribute to Nick.

Wildlife was released in Japan by Disk Union on Arcangelo Records and by Voiceprint Records for the Rest of the World. The Japanese release was sold in a limited edition paper sleeve.

== Track listing ==
1. "Creatures of the Magic Water - Opening Theme" (0:59)
2. "Green Hell" (0:30)
3. "Jaguar and the Terrapin" (0:49)
4. "Flooded Forest" (1:59)
5. "Hidden Shadow" (1:03)
6. "River God" (1:35)
7. "Secrets of the Amazon" (1:37)
8. "Killing Grounds" (1:31)
9. "River Dolphins" (1:09)
10. "Faces in the Forest" (0:44)
11. "Final Journey" (1:40)
12. "Onza - Eater of Souls" (1:46)
13. "Relentless Sun - in Half-Drowned Lands" (1:49)
14. "Serengeti Jigsaw - Opening Theme" (1:20)
15. "Massacre of the Termites" (1:20)
16. "Web of the Spider Monkey - Opening Theme" (2:32)
17. "Island of Stone" (2:37)
18. "Fireflies" (1:12)
19. "Courting Chameleons" (1:34)
20. "Rock Spires, Crocodile Caves" (1:21)
21. "Dusty Track" (0:43)
22. "Fathomless Caverns" (2:15)
23. "Storm Breaks" (1:35)
24. "Morning Call" (0:47)
25. "Autumn Dusk" (0:52)
26. "Bears of Kamchatka - Opening Theme" (0:56)
27. "In the Tundra" (0:43)
28. "Across the Frozen Wastes" (3:12)
29. "Nighthunt" (0:54)
30. "Cubs" (1:35)
31. "Mother of the Moon" (1:59)
32. "Jurassic Shark - Opening Theme" (1:41)
33. "Ray's Song" (1:28)
34. "Voyage of the Whale Shark" (2:33)
35. "Megalodon" (0:58)
36. "The Only Good Shark is a Dead One" (0:50)
37. "Back Through Time - Under The Ocean" (2:10)
38. "Jurassic Shark - Closing Theme" (0:38)
39. "Midway: Island of Life - Opening Theme" (2:09)
40. "Dolphins at Play" (1:57)
41. "Dolphins, Seals & Rays" (1:34)
42. "Mysteries of the Wreck" (1:37)
43. "Sunset Flight" (1:14)
44. "Fight to the Death" (2:14)
45. "From the Jaws of Death - Touching the Face of God" (3:08)

== Personnel ==
- Anthony Phillips - keyboards, guitars
- Joji Hirota - assorted percussion & flutes, recorder, shakuhachi
- Martin Robertson - soprano saxophone on tracks 12 & 13
- Laura Melluish - violin on track 43

Technical

- Produced by Anthony Phillips and Joji Hirota
- Graphic design by GRDD
- Cover photography by Dirk Smorgasbord
