= Wolfgang Stryi =

German musician

Wolfgang Stryi (4 March 1957 – 22 February 2005) was a German composer, bass and double bass clarinetist, tenor saxophone player and a permanent member of the Ensemble Modern.

== Life and career ==
Stryi was born in Rottweil. For twenty-four years, he participated in the concerts and discography of contemporary classical music of the grassroots democracy organized Ensemble Modern.

He was concerned with the balance between interpretation, improvisation and musical composition and had a lasting influence on the programme of the Ensemble. A documented conversation with Péter Eötvös from 2000 describes difficulties and practice-oriented approaches in the creation and interpretation of ensemble and orchestral works with improvisational and compositional elements.

As part of the collaboration between the Ensemble Modern and Frank Zappa, Stryi participated extensively in the CD Yellow Shark. The world premiere took place in 1992 at the Alte Oper Frankfurt.

In addition, he performed concert readings with Hartmut Barth-Engelbart and played in duo with Alfred 23 Harth, with whom he recorded the CD Modern Post in 1997.

Stryi dedicated the composition Aprikosenbäume gibt es, aprikosenbäume gibt es in memoriam Rolf Riehm. The premiere took place on 6 May 2006 at the Wittener Tage für neue Kammermusik. In 2010 it was performed at the Oper Frankfurt.

Stryi died in Frankfurt am Main at age 47.
