= Wu Fei (musician) =

Chinese-American composer (born 1977)

Wu Fei 吴非
- Born: May 12, 1977 (age 49); Beijing, China
- Genres: Avant-garde, fusion, jazz
- Occupations: Composer, musician, singer
- Instruments: Guzheng, piano, voice
- Labels: Smithsonian Records, Tzadik Records, Forrest Hill Records

Wu Fei (Chinese: 吴非; pinyin: Wú Fēi, born May 12, 1977) is a virtuoso Chinese American composer, performer, and improviser from Beijing, China. She performs on the Chinese guzheng, an ancient zither with twenty-one strings, as well as sings. Since 2015 she has lived in Nashville, Tennessee. Wu Fei has composed for a variety of musical genres, including choir, string quartet, chamber ensemble, Balinese gamelan, orchestral, film, and modern dance.

== Life ==
Born in Beijing, Wu Fei studied at the China Conservatory of Music until 2000. She continued her education at Mills College where she earned a M.A. in composition (2002–04). Her musical mission has been to extend the sonic experience of the traditional guzheng performance with twenty-first musical improvisational materials, techniques, and performances. As a participant in the downtown New York improvisation scene, she had many opportunities to explore genres with a myriad of like-minded musicians. She has teamed up with John Zorn, Fred Frith, Gyan Riley, Carla Kihlstedt, Billy Martin, The Wu-Force, and Abigail Washburn.

Wu Fei has been a part of many notable venues and events. In October 2008, Wu Fei was the curator for The Stone (NYC). In October 2009, a music DVD "Shan Qi" was released (Ozella Music, Germany), filmed in the Italian Alps and highlighting Wu Fei and several outstanding European musicians, including Guo Yue, Giovanni Amighetti (also producer), Guido Ponzini, and Helge Andreas Norbakken. In March 2011, Wu Fei gave a live performance on guzheng and voice at the Hermès fashion show during Paris fashion week. For 2018–2019, Wu Fei is Composer-in-Residence for the Nashville, Tennessee ensemble, chatterbird.

Wu Fei has toured and performed around the world. Highlight of her tours include performance at Forbidden City Concert Hall in Beijing, EXPO 2010 in Shanghai, North Sea Jazz Festival in the Netherlands, Vossajazz in Norway, Europalia Festival in Belgium, Madame Guitar Festival in Italy, and the Big Ears Festival in Tennessee.

== Musical collaborations ==
=== Fred Frith (1949–) ===
Fred Frith is an English multi-instrumentalist, composer, and improvisor, who taught Wu Fei at Mills College. Wu Fei appeared on Fred Frith's albums Eye to Ear II (2004), The Happy End Problem (2006), and Eye to Ear III (2010), as well as his soundtrack for the PBS documentary film Thirst.

=== Gyan Riley (1977–) ===
Wu and Riley are both classically trained performers and composers who have also embraced various improvisational styles. They draw from a variety of traditions, including jazz, Indian raga, and Chinese, Spanish, and Western classical music.

=== Abigail Washburn (1977—) ===
Wu and Washburn have known each other since 2006. Washburn is a Grammy award-winning singer, songwriter and clawhammer banjo player based in Nashville, Tennessee, whose music often meshes traditional Appalachian and Chinese folk tunes. Washburn's personal studies in Chinese culture and music have made their performances a dynamic multilingual and multi-instrumental experience. Their musical collaboration began with a concert as The Wu-Force at the Yugong Yishan music club in Beijing in late 2011. The Wu-Force includes Wu, Washburn, and Kai Welch on keyboard, trumpet, guitar and loop. Their first album, Wu Fei & Abigail Washburn (Smithsonian Folkways, 2020), combines American and Chinese folk songs, highlighting music from Appalachia and Xinjiang, China.

== Selected works ==
- "Hello Gold Mountain" is a work for chamber orchestra that had its world premiere February 23, 2019. Inspired by the European Jewish refugees who fled eastward to Shanghai, and ultimately to San Francisco, Wu applied her professional and personal experience to compose a work for the music ensemble chatterbird, featuring the sonic intersections of the oud and the guzheng, representing the Jewish and Chinese voices, respectively. Wu described her composition as "my attempt to write music that I think could have come out of the fascinating cultural possibilities of the Jewish presence in Shanghai." Although labeled as somber requiem, the work has been praised as a "multicultural song of life and hope."
- "Four Seasons" is a guzheng-banjo duet performed by Wu Fei and Abigail Washburn. It is a part of a program where Wu and Washburn perform a selection of songs based on traditional Appalachian and Chinese music.

== Personal life ==
Wu lives in Nashville with her husband, the South African-born editor and entrepreneur Jeremy Goldkorn, and their two children.

== Discography ==
- A Distant Youth – September 2007, Forrest Hill Records (Italy)

In Fall 2007, Wu Fei's debut solo record "A Distant Youth" was released on Forrest Hill Records. The records also features Fred Frith (guitar), Carla Kihlstedt (violin), and Helge Andreas Norbakken (percussion).

- Yuan – November 2008, Tzadik Records (US)

In October 2008, Wu Fei released a CD entitled "YUAN-缘" produced by John Zorn for Tzadik Records of her chamber compositions to be released in fall 2008. One major piece "She Huo-社火" featured on this new record was premiered at the Forbidden City Concert Hall (Beijing) with Percussions Claviers de Lyon in Spring 2007. In 2008, she relocated to New York City.

- Pluck – December 2011, Pluck Duo (US)

Pluck was a string duo formed by Wu Fei (guzheng / vocals) and Gyan Riley (guitar) from their summer shows in New York City 2011. Their collaboration were showcased in a series of shows at The Stone, Barbès, and the Museum of Modern Art.

=== As guest musician ===
- Fred Frith: Eye to Ear II – 2004, Tzadik Records (US)
- Fred Frith: The Happy End Problem – December 2006
- Various artists: Shan Qi (DVD) – November 2009, Ozella Music (Germany)
- Fred Frith: Eye to Ear III – November 2010, Tzadik Records (US)
- Abigail Washburn: City of Refuge – January 11, 2011, Rounder Records (US)
- Fred Frith: Clearing Customs – February 2011, Intakt Records (Switzerland), a project under Germany's SWR "New Jazz Meeting"

== Selected awards ==
- Best World Music Artist 2008 – Westword.
- "Yuan" Best Album of The Week – Alarm Magazine November 25, 2008
- Composer Fellowship, the Sally & Don Lucas Artist Residency by Montalvo Arts Center, 2009.
- DVD "Shan Qi" nominated for Preis der deutschen Schallplattenkritik (Award of the German Record Critique), 2009.
- Wu Fei with Chatterbird is the winner of Best Genre-Defying Classical Performance by Nashville Scene 2017's Writer's Choice.
- MAP Fund Award, "Hello Gold Mountain," 2018.
