= Kaoru Watanabe =

- Born: July 3, 1975 (age 50); St. Louis, Missouri, U.S.
- Genres: Jazz
- Occupation: Musician
- Instruments: Drums; flute
- Years active: 1999–present

Kaoru Watanabe (born July 3, 1975) is a Japanese-American composer, flautist, percussionist, improviser, curator, and artistic director.

== Early life and education ==
Kaoru was born to Japanese parents Haruka and Ayako Watanabe in St. Louis, Missouri, on July 3, 1975. His parents were a violinist and a harpist in the St. Louis Symphony Orchestra. He is a graduate of the Manhattan School of Music, where he studied jazz flute and saxophone.

== Career in Japan ==
Post-graduation, Watanabe moved to Japan in 1997, where he studied nohkan under Hiroyuki Matsuda of the Morita School, shinobue under Kyosuke Suzuki of the Wakayama Shachu and drumming under Tosha Kiyonari at Nihon Taiko Dojo. In 1999, he joined the Sado Island-based taiko group Kodo. Watanabe became the first American performer and artistic director of Kodo.

== Career in the USA ==
Watanabe is a well known collaborator working with artists like Wes Anderson, Mikhail Baryshnikov, Laurie Anderson, Jason Moran, Yo-Yo Ma, Eva Yerbabuena, Yo-Yo Ma's Silkroad Ensemble, and Rhiannon Giddens, among others. He is also working on film music, contributed to the music in movies like Silence, "Ultraman: Rising", "Shrek Forever After", and "Isle of Dogs". Since 2017 he has collaborated with Adam Rudolph in his albums and live performances.

Watanabe established the Kaoru Watanabe Taiko Center and performs with the Kaoru Watanabe Taiko Center Ensemble.

In 2024, Watanabe launched and became the artistic director of the Bloodlines Interwoven Festival, featuring artists like Layale Chaker, Mino Cinélu, Amir ElSaffar, Matt Garrison, Maeve Gilchrist, Alicia Hall Moran, Susie Ibarra, Martha Redbone, Jen Shyu, Nasheet Waits, Du Yun, Jeffrey Zeigler and others. Among many performances around the country, he has performed at the Lincoln Center in New York.

In 2023 he was teaching as Artist-In-Residence at the Loyola University. He is also teaching using the platform kaDON, which aims at supporting the taiko community with access to instructors and musical instruments. Watanabe has also taught courses at Princeton University, Wesleyan University, Colby College, and Dickinson College. He is also part of the artistic family at The Canales Project.

In 2016 he published an album, Néo, "a synthesis of dignified taiko drumming with the jazz sensibility of improvisation".
