= Sheng (instrument) =

Gourd mouth organ from China

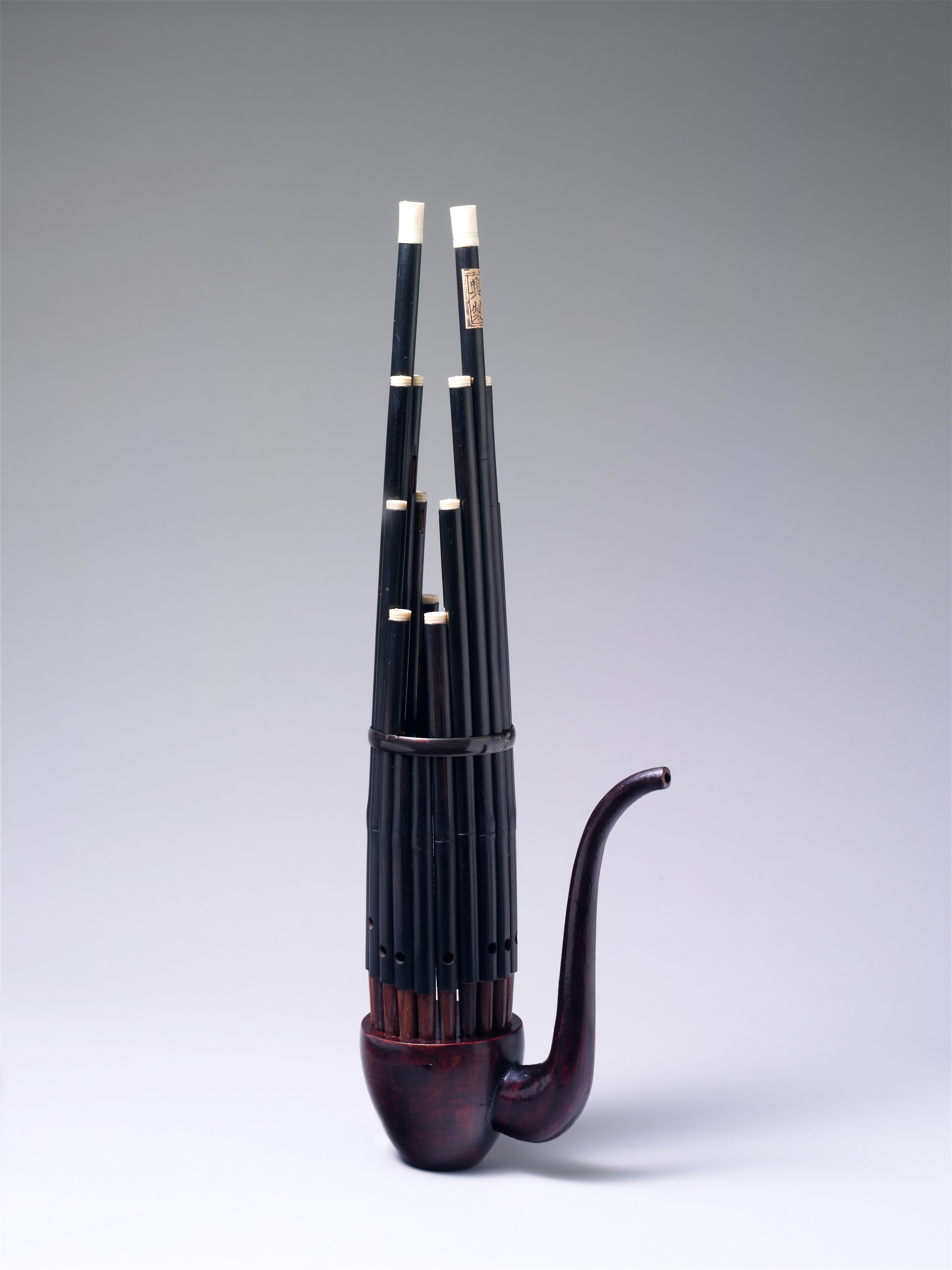
- A late 19th-century sheng in the Metropolitan Museum of Art.

Woodwind instrument
- Classification: Aerophone; Interruptive free aerophone; Free reed aerophone
- Hornbostel–Sachs classification: 412.132 (Sets of free reeds)

Related instruments
- shō; khene; bawu; hulusi; harmonica

Sheng
- Illustration from the Complete Classics Collection of Ancient China (c. 1700–25)
- Chinese: 笙
Transcriptions
Standard Mandarin
- Hanyu Pinyin: shēng
Hakka
- Romanization: sen^{1}
Yue: Cantonese
- Yale Romanization: saang^{1}, sang^{1}
Southern Min
- Hokkien POJ: seng
Middle Chinese
- Middle Chinese: /ʃˠæŋ/
Old Chinese
- Zhengzhang: /*sreŋ/

The sheng (Chinese: 笙) is a Chinese mouth-blown polyphonic free reed instrument consisting of vertical pipes.

It is one of the oldest Chinese instruments, with images depicting its kind dating back to 1100 BCE, and there are original instruments from the Han dynasty that are preserved in museums today. Traditionally, the sheng has been used as an accompaniment instrument for solo suona or dizi performances. It is one of the main instruments in kunqu and some other forms of Chinese opera. Traditional small ensembles also make use of the sheng, such as the wind and percussion ensembles in northern China. In the modern large Chinese orchestra, it is used for both melody and accompaniment.

The sheng has been used in the works of a few non-Chinese composers, including Unsuk Chin, Jukka Tiensuu, Lou Harrison, Tim Risher, Daníel Bjarnason, Guus Janssen and Christopher Adler. Some believe that Johann Wilde and Pere Amiot traveled to China and brought the first sheng to Europe in 1740 and 1777 respectively, although there is evidence that free reed musical instruments similar to the sheng were known in Europe a century earlier.

== History ==
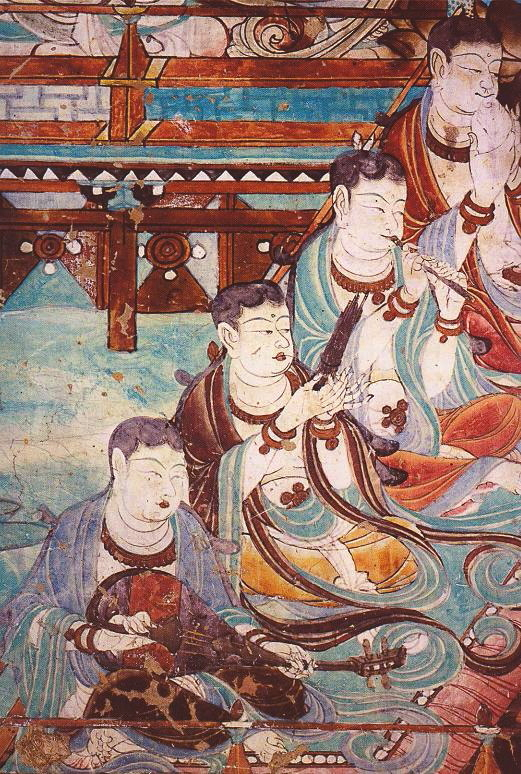
Buddhist art from the Yulin Caves, Tang dynasty showing musicians playing various instruments including a sheng

Chinese free-reed wind instruments named sheng and yu were first mentioned in bone oracle writings dating from the 14th to the 12th centuries BCE, and were identified in later texts as types of sheng. The first appearance of the word sheng is in some of the poems of Shijing (Book of Odes), dating back c. 7th century BCE. Ancient instruments with gourd wind chambers, varying numbers of pipes, with bamboo or metal reeds have been discovered in archaeological finds at the tomb of the Marquis Yi of Zeng (c. 433 BCE) in present-day Hubei province, and the Han tombs at Mawangdui (c. 2nd century BCE) in Hunan province.

In the 8th century, three yu and three sheng were sent to the Japanese court and these have been preserved in the Shōsōin imperial repository in Nara. All the instruments had 17 pipes with a long curving mouthpiece and are very similar to the traditional sheng in use today. However, variants with different numbers of pipes, and chromatic instruments have been documented over the centuries.

=== Modern changes ===
The kinds of sheng currently used are the products of changes made since the early 20th century that enhanced its sound and volume as well as increasing its range. Early changes were made by Zheng Jinwen (鄭覲文, 1872–1935) who increased the number of pipes to 32, expanding its range and allowing it to play harmony and chords. The air chamber and size of the pipes were also enlarged, changing the tone color of the instrument. Later various changes were also introduced by players such as Weng Zhenfa (翁鎮發) and particularly Hu Tianquan (胡天泉), with different variants of the instrument produced.

== Acoustics and performance ==
The sheng's reeds vibrate at a fixed frequency unlike single reeds, double reeds, and pointed free reeds which vibrate at the pitch according to the length of the attached air column. Covering the hole(s) on a traditional sheng's pipe(s) would cause the entire length of the pipe(s) to resonate with the reeds' frequency. If the hole is open, the resonant frequency would not match, and hence no sound is produced.

The sheng is sounded by either exhaling or inhaling into the mouthpiece, and players can produce a relatively continuous sound without pause by quickly switching between the two, similarly to playing a harmonica. The traditional performance style is to sound two or three notes at the same time by adding a fifth and/or octave above the main melody note. When a higher note is not available, a lower note a fourth below the main melody note can be played instead.

== Types ==
Sheng varieties can be classified into traditional sheng (Chinese: 传统笙; pinyin: chuántǒng shēng) and keyed sheng (键笙; jiàn shēng) (sometimes also known as "improved sheng" (改良笙; Gǎiliáng shēng)). Keyed shengs were only developed in the 20th century, from roughly 1950 onwards.

With more and more hybrid models being introduced, the difference between the two types of sheng are increasingly blurred. However, sheng instruments are generally categorized into either type based on the kind of fingering system that they adopt. This includes (on traditional sheng) certain notes (namely the leading note, submediant, dominant, followed by tonic) present as a group on the left posterior side. Due to fourth and fifth harmonies being common in traditional sheng repertoire, the fingerings on traditional sheng are optimized for such. As a result, fingerings for traditional sheng tend to look jumbled up, and can vary regionally. Keyed sheng, on the other hand, have sequenced fingerings that allow for easy key changes.

On a traditional sheng, there are holes on the finger pipes which can be covered by the player's fingers to sound that particular note. On a keyed sheng, the holes are opened and closed by means of keys or levers. The greater number of pipes combined with the size of the larger instruments makes it impractical to operate newer instruments without keys.

=== Traditional sheng ===
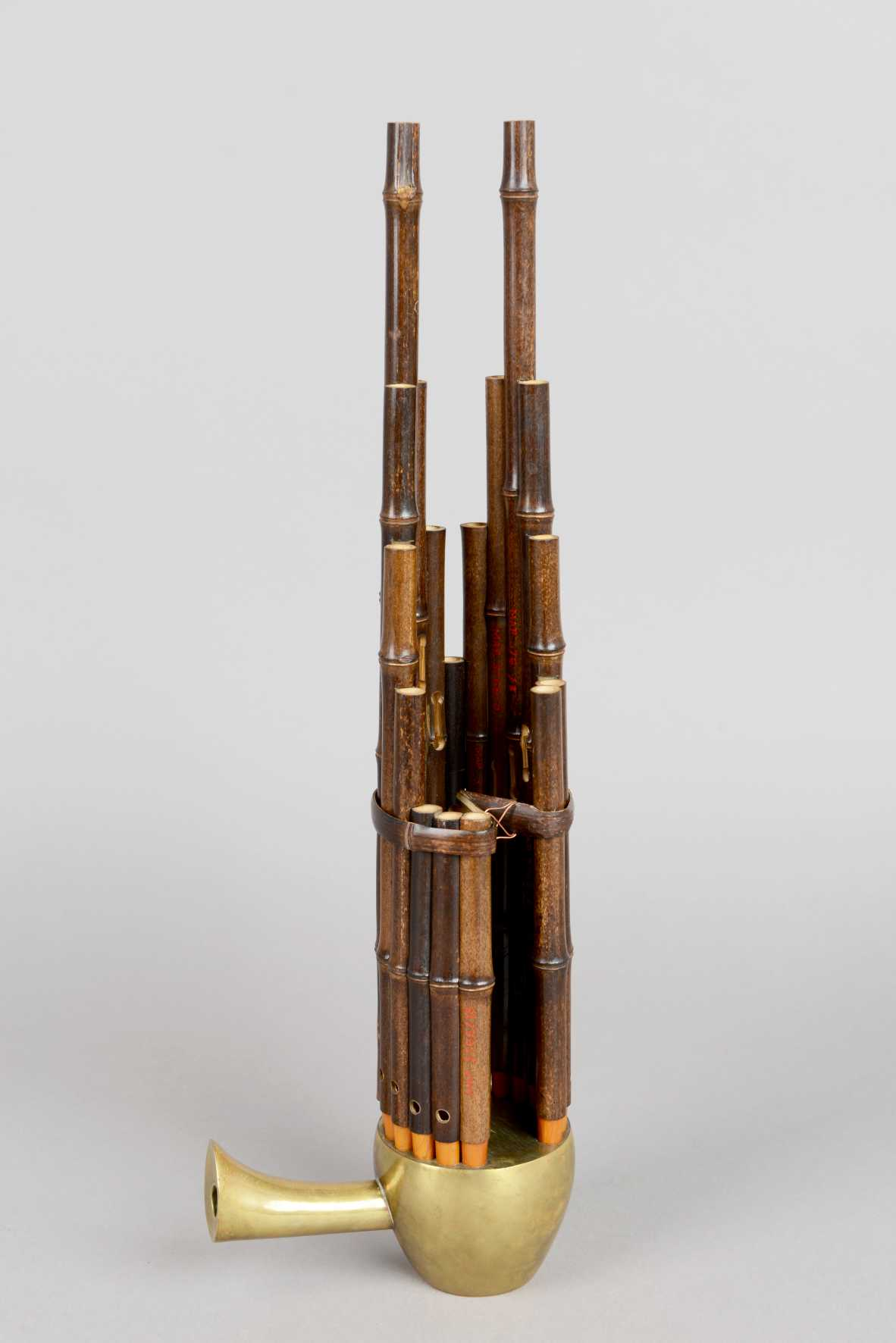
Sheng – Asia and Pacific Museum in Warsaw

The traditional sheng (传统笙; chuántǒng shēng) used in, for example, northern Chinese ritual music, kunqu and Jiangnan sizhu ensembles generally have 17 pipes but with only 13 or 14 sounding pipes. Its scale is mainly diatonic, for example the 17-pipe (4 of which are silent decorative pipes) sheng used in Jiangnan sizhu is tuned:

With the development of guoyue music in mid-20th century China, the sheng underwent changes to increase its range and volume. The guoyue sheng had all its 17 pipes fitted with reeds, then the number of pipes increased to 21, and metal tubes were attached to the bamboo pipes to amplify its sound. The other change was the development of the keyed sheng.

Nowadays, traditional sheng are usually only used for solo repertoire, due their not being fully chromatic (and also the fact that certain techniques – like glissandi – can only be achieved on a traditional sheng). For an orchestra setting, keyed sheng tend to be preferred for being fully chromatic. Many modern traditional sheng do come with some keys for ease of fingering; there are also fully chromatic traditional sheng. These are still known by the blanket term "traditional sheng" due to them retaining the typical traditional sheng-like fingering. Also, traditional sheng are usually held in the player's hands when playing, and a 37-reed fully chromatic traditional sheng tends to be too heavy to be held for long performances.

=== Keyed sheng ===
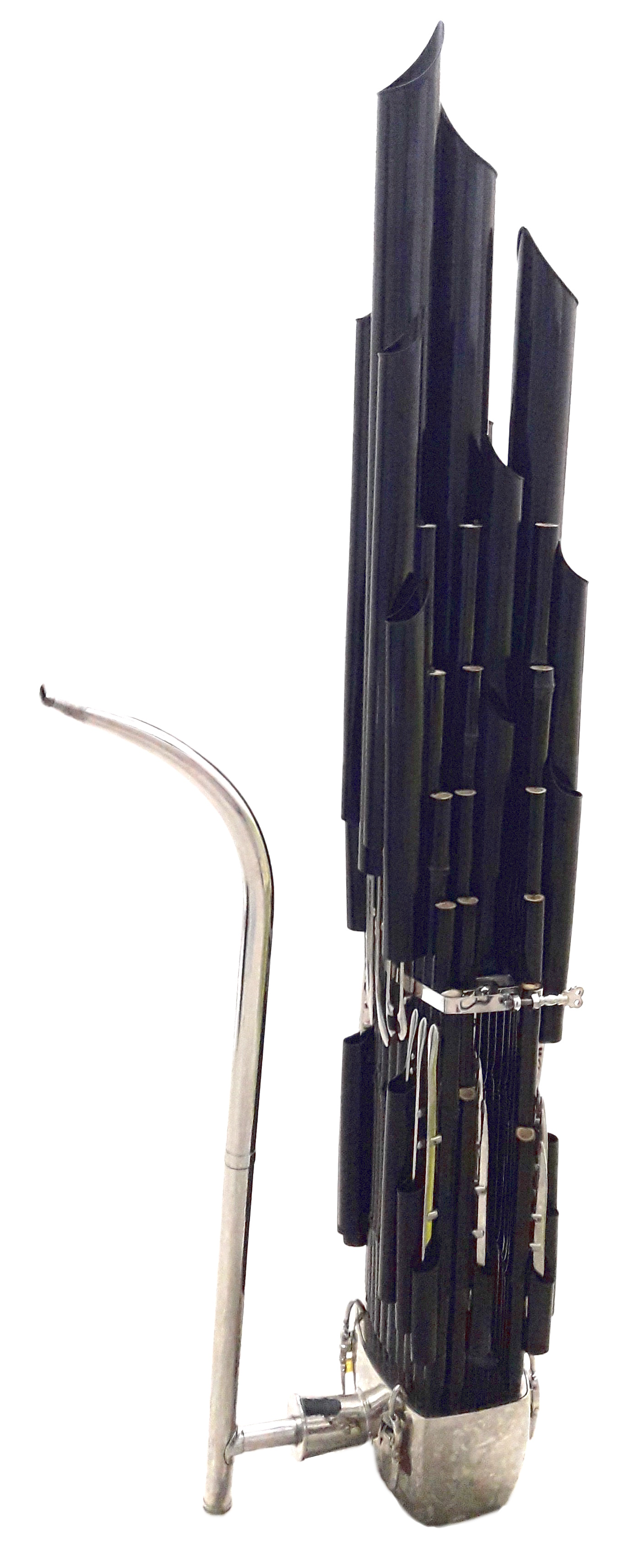
36-reed soprano sheng

Chromatic 24- and 26-reed keyed sheng were common during the 1950s, but current models usually have 32 to 38 reeds. There are four main ranges of keyed sheng, forming a family of soprano, alto, tenor and bass. All are chromatic throughout their range, and equal tempered. They have markedly different fingering from their traditional counterparts, having been redesigned so that key changes can be achieved without cumbersome fingerings. These also differ from their traditional counterparts by the fact that they tend to be placed on the musician's lap or on a stand while playing.

==== Soprano sheng ====
The soprano sheng (Chinese: 高音笙; pinyin: Gāoyīn Shēng) is a 36-reed sheng with a soprano range of G3 to F#6. It primarily uses the treble clef in sounding pitch.

However, to suit the needs of modern repertoire, 38- or even 42-reed sheng have become increasingly prevalent in the late 2010s (those go all the way up to C7). Some models even include levers that allow for sounding of chords (i.e. more than one note is sounded when one lever is depressed).

The Piccolo Sheng is twice as size as soprano sheng but has one octave higher than the soprano sheng

==== Alto sheng ====
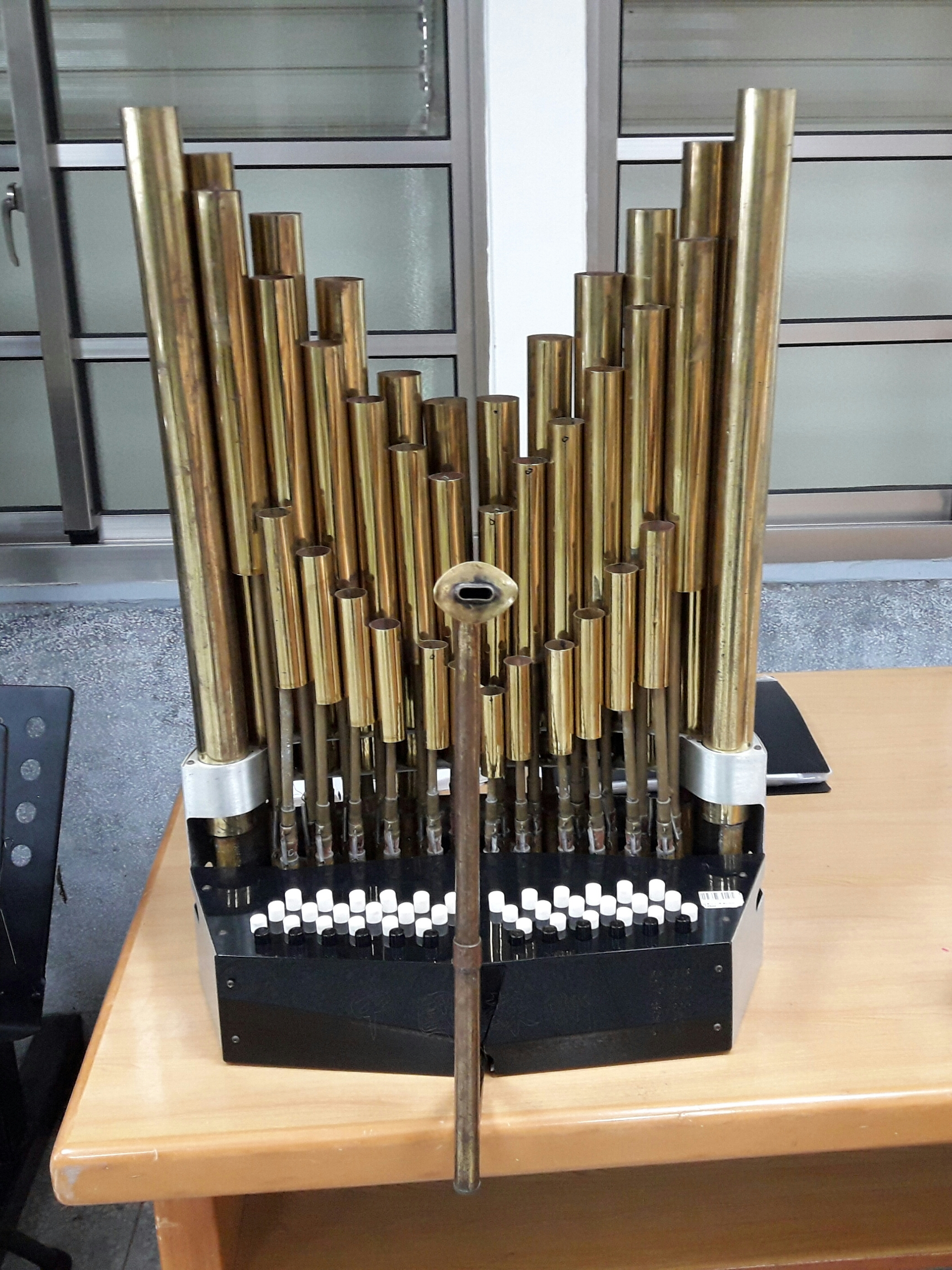
Alto sheng

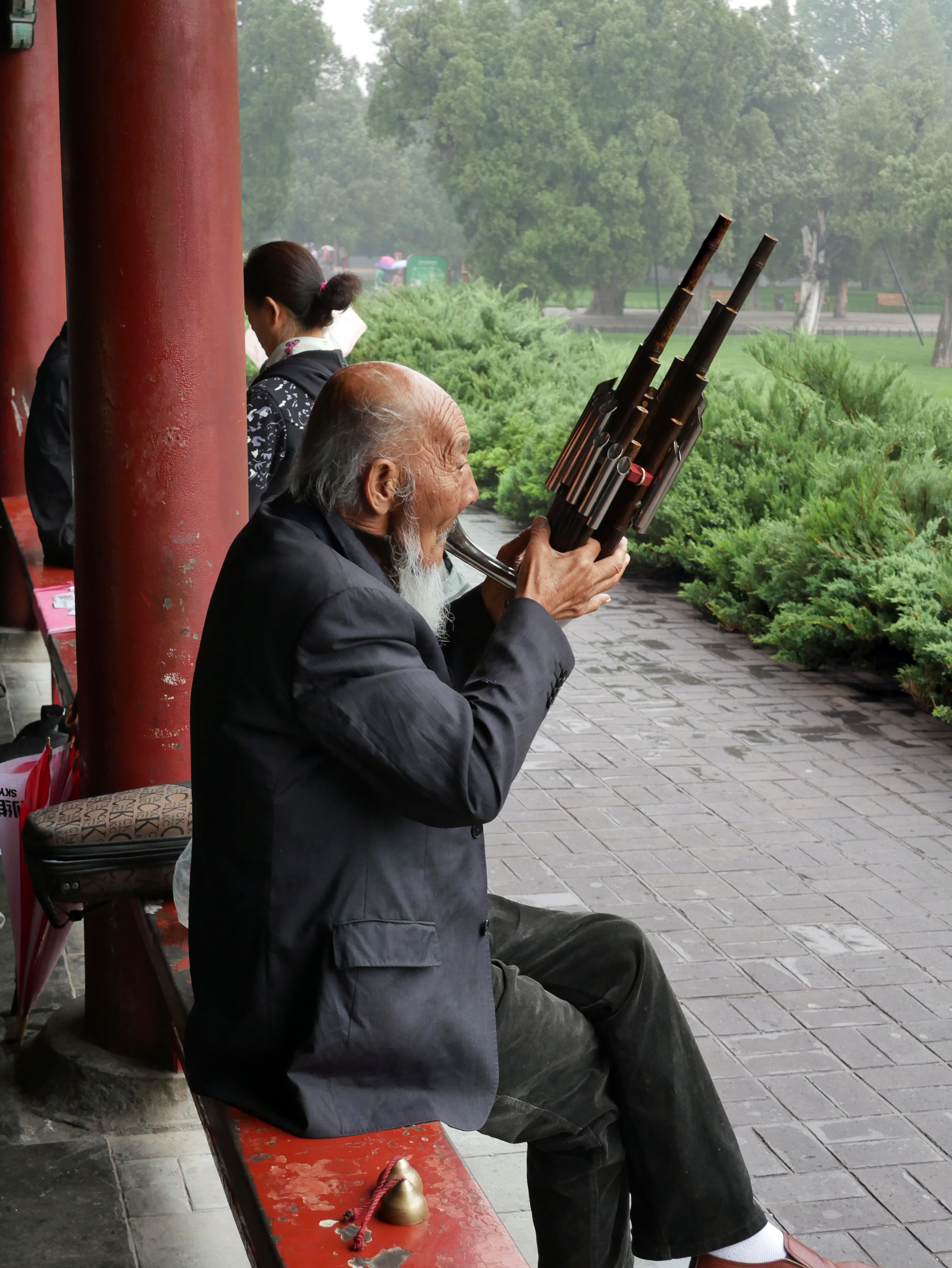
Man playing sheng outdoors, Beijing

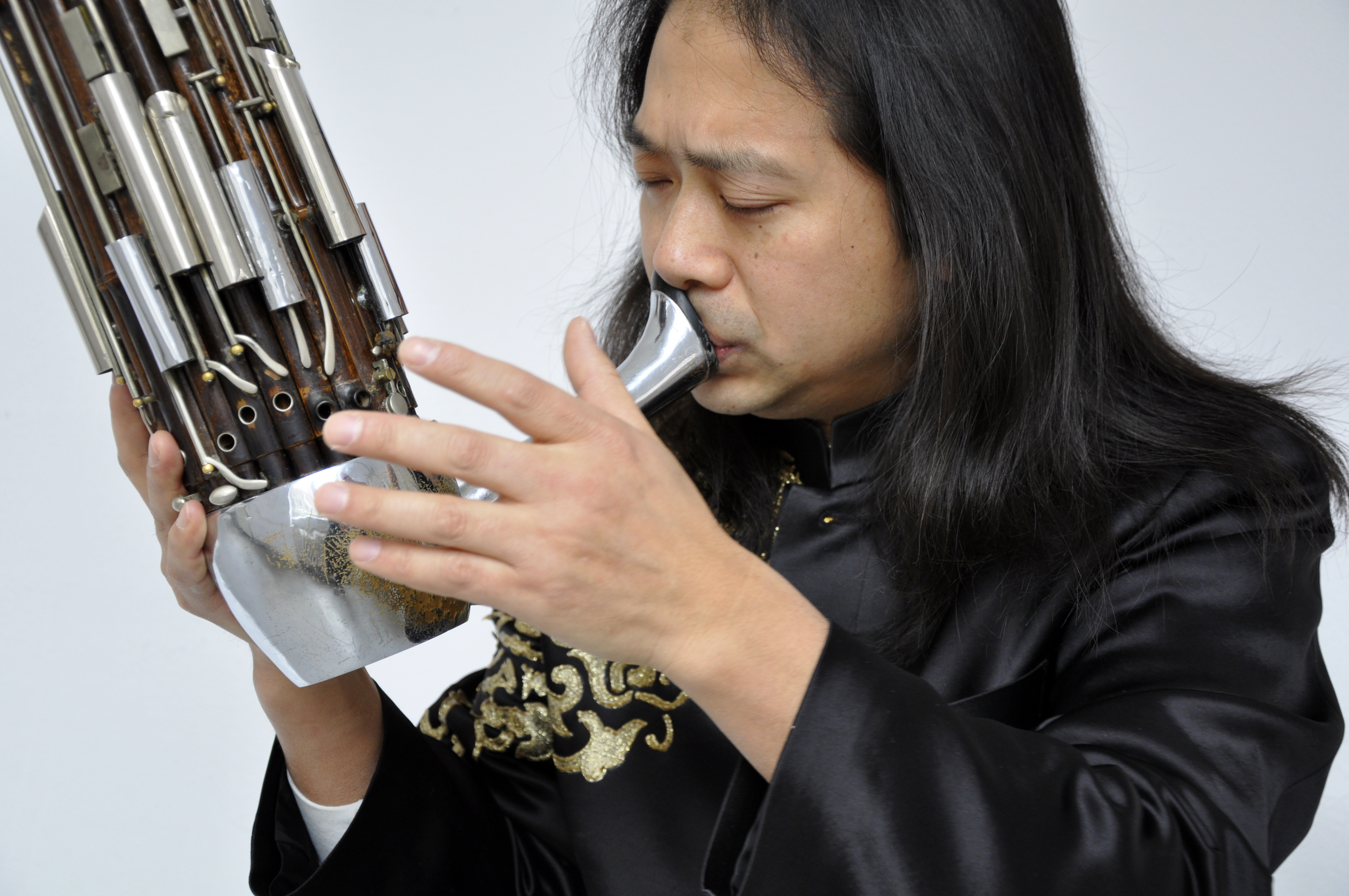
Musician Wu Wei playing the sheng

The alto sheng (Chinese: 中音笙; pinyin: Zhōngyīn Shēng) is a 36-reed sheng with an alto range of C3 to B5. They sound a perfect 5th lower than soprano sheng. They often sport an additional row of 12 black keys, that play all 3 pipes corresponding to the same note in different octaves (e.g., pressing the black "C" causes the notes C3, C4 and C5 to be sounded simultaneously). It primarily uses the treble (octave down) and alto clefs (albeit less common as of the late 2010s – notably with Singapore Chinese Orchestra deciding to scribe alto sheng scores in treble clef). The alto variants tend to have a more mellow timbre than the slightly more metallic sounding soprano sheng. While many countries have alto sheng with a range of C3 to B5, some regional variants tend to have a range of G2 to F#5 (i.e. the tenor sheng's range).

The alto sheng plays an important role in modern Chinese orchestras, serving to provide chordal accompaniment as well as supplementing lower-pitched instruments like the cello. There are two main form factors of alto sheng in modern Chinese music: the bao sheng (抱笙; 'hug sheng') and the pai sheng (排笙; 'sheng in rows'). The bao sheng is usually placed on the musician's lap; one would reach around to the buttons on its posterior (in effect hugging the instrument, and hence the name). It is cylindrical in nature, and tends to be smaller (i.e. less heavy and bulky) due to the pipes having been engineered to bend inside the body to make effective use of all available space inside the sheng. This, however, presents the drawback of it being difficult to disassemble and reassemble for maintenance or repairs. The pai sheng on the other hand, is typically placed on a sheng stand. This form is so named as the pipes and resonators are arranged into 3 rows (in a linear manner) instead of a circular fashion. These are commonly seen in school orchestras, as there is a reduced likelihood of it being dropped (since it is placed on a stand), and is less difficult/expensive to repair (due to its simpler layout).

==== Tenor sheng ====
The tenor sheng (Chinese: 次中音笙; pinyin: Cìzhōngyīn Shēng) is a 36-reed sheng with a tenor range of G2 to F♯5 or F2 to E5 that sound one octave lower than soprano sheng, and primarily uses the tenor clef or treble clef (octave down), and at times the bass clef. This variant tends to have a warmer and richer timbre, despite being less common than its alto counterpart. They are sometimes made with more reeds to cover the alto sheng's range as well, and also come in 2 form factors (pai sheng and bao sheng).

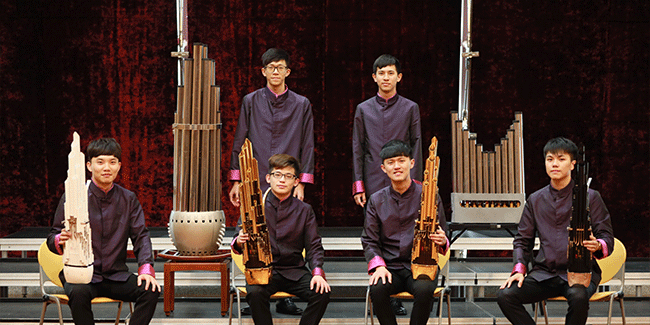
Sheng players from Taiwan with different types of sheng

==== Bass sheng ====
The bass sheng (Chinese: 低音笙; pinyin: Dīyīn Shēng) is usually a 32-reed sheng with a bass range of C2 to G4, and primarily uses the bass clef.

These similarly come in two form factors as well: the da paisheng (大排笙; 'large row sheng'); a large standing organ-like instrument that comes with or without pedals (the pedals are used to pump air into the instrument like a reed organ), and the bao sheng (lit. "held sheng", although it is placed on a stand due to its weight). With the bass sheng, the differences between the 2 variants are more pronounced; bass paisheng tend to require a greater breath volume to play.

The Contrabass Sheng is also used for bass sheng but two octaves lower than the alto sheng and tenor sheng

==== Keyboard sheng ====
In the 21st century, keyboard sheng (Chinese: 键盘笙; pinyin: Jiànpán Shēng), or pai sheng that have a keyboard layout instead of the typical buttons, have emerged. These can vary from 37-reed sheng all the way to 53-reed ones (if not more like 61), covering a variety of ranges from alto to bass. The keyboard sheng has a range of up to 5 octaves from C2 to C7 just like many modern day pipe organs. Keyboard sheng are considered niche, as very few repertoires make use of the keyboard layout. In fact, many of the chordal parts written for sheng are currently heavily clustered, and as such, a keyboard layout tends to result in slightly cumbersome fingering. However, repertoire written for piano is playable on them.

== See also ==
- Music of China
- Traditional Chinese musical instruments
- Khene
- Lusheng
- Mangtong
- Plung
- Saenghwang
- Shō
- Yu (wind instrument)
