= What Leave Behind =

Studio album by Toychestra and Fred Frith
- Released: 2004
- Recorded: May 2003 and January 2004
- Studio: Guerilla Recordings, Oakland, California
- Genre: Experimental
- Length: 24:18
- Label: S.K. Records
- Producer: Dan Plonsey, Toychestra, Fred Frith, Myles Boisen

Fred Frith chronology
Eye to Ear II (2004)	What Leave Behind (2004)	50th Birthday Celebration Volume Five (2004)

What Leave Behind is a 2004 studio album by Oakland, California-based experimental music group Toychestra and English experimental guitarist Fred Frith. It was recorded in May 2003 and January 2004, and was released in 2004 on the French label, S.K. Records. It is a concerto for electric guitar and toy orchestra composed by Dan Plonsey for Toychestra and Frith to perform.

== Background ==
Composer and saxophonist Dan Plonsey from the San Francisco Bay Area Improv Scene first got to know Toychestra in 1998 when he booked them at his Beanbender's music venue in Berkeley, California. He was intrigued by their performance, and decided to team them up with fellow Bay Area Improv Scene member and experimental guitarist, Fred Frith. Plonsey wrote a concerto for electric guitar and toy orchestra for Toychestra and Frith to perform. The concerto turned out to be a challenge for Plonsey because most of the members of Toychestra could not read sheet music. He said that he "started out writing some simple, repeating bits to play. I wanted to see what would happen, because they'd never worked with written music before. It was all totally aural." Plonsey was impressed with the result.

== Reception ==
Professional ratings
Review scores
Source	Rating
AllMusic	3.5/5 stars

Casey Rae-Hunter of Dusted Magazine said that the collaboration of Toychestra and Fred Frith on What Leave Behind is "hilarious, stunning, intense, and highly listenable", and described the music as "polyphonic bedtime music for the half-forgotten child within". Joshua Glazer of AllMusic had reservations about this Frith / Toychestra liaison, but was surprised at the result, saying that it was "far more palatable than one would initially expect." Glazer described the concerto as "an experimental piece that never gazes too intently at its own weirdness or technique."

== Track listing ==
All tracks are written by Dan Plonsey.

No.	Title	Length
1.	"The Dub"	4:27
2.	"Fellini"	4:36
3.	"Grover Rides a Happy Honker"	3:46
4.	"3 Elephants and a Cow"	7:30
5.	"When to Rewind"	3:59

== Personnel ==
- Fred Frith – electric guitar
- Toychestra
  - Michelle Adams – sterling beat, finger chimes, concertmate 500, melodica, recorder, vocals
  - Angela Coon – melodica, toy bugle, genie diary "girlz rock", vocals
  - Petra Podlahová – accordion people, concertmate 500, slat drum, sterling beat
  - Shari Robertson – zither, violin, melodica, vocals
  - Lexa Walsh – accordion people, xylo-piano, silly sentences, vocals
  - Corey Weinstein – melodica, pink zoo train, tube xylophone, train whistle, vocals

=== Production and artwork ===
- Recorded at Guerrilla Recording in May 2003 and January 2004
- Mixed by Dan Plonsey, Fred Frith, Myles Boisen, Lexa Walsh
- Produced by Dan Plonsey, Toychestra, Fred Frith and Myles Boisen
- Mastered by Myles Boisen
- Photography by Gary Nakamoto
- Graphic design by Lexa Walsh
