= Institut Seni Indonesia =

Institut Seni Indonesia or Indonesian Institute of Arts may refer to:

- Indonesian Institute of Arts, Denpasar
- Indonesia Institute of the Arts Yogyakarta
- Indonesian Institute of the Arts, Surakarta

== See also ==
- Institute of Indonesian Arts and Culture, Bandung
- List of universities in Indonesia
