= David Elrod =

David Elrod may refer to:

- David Elrod, character in Altars of Desire
- David Elrod, musician in The Union Trade
