= Toychestra =

American experimental music group

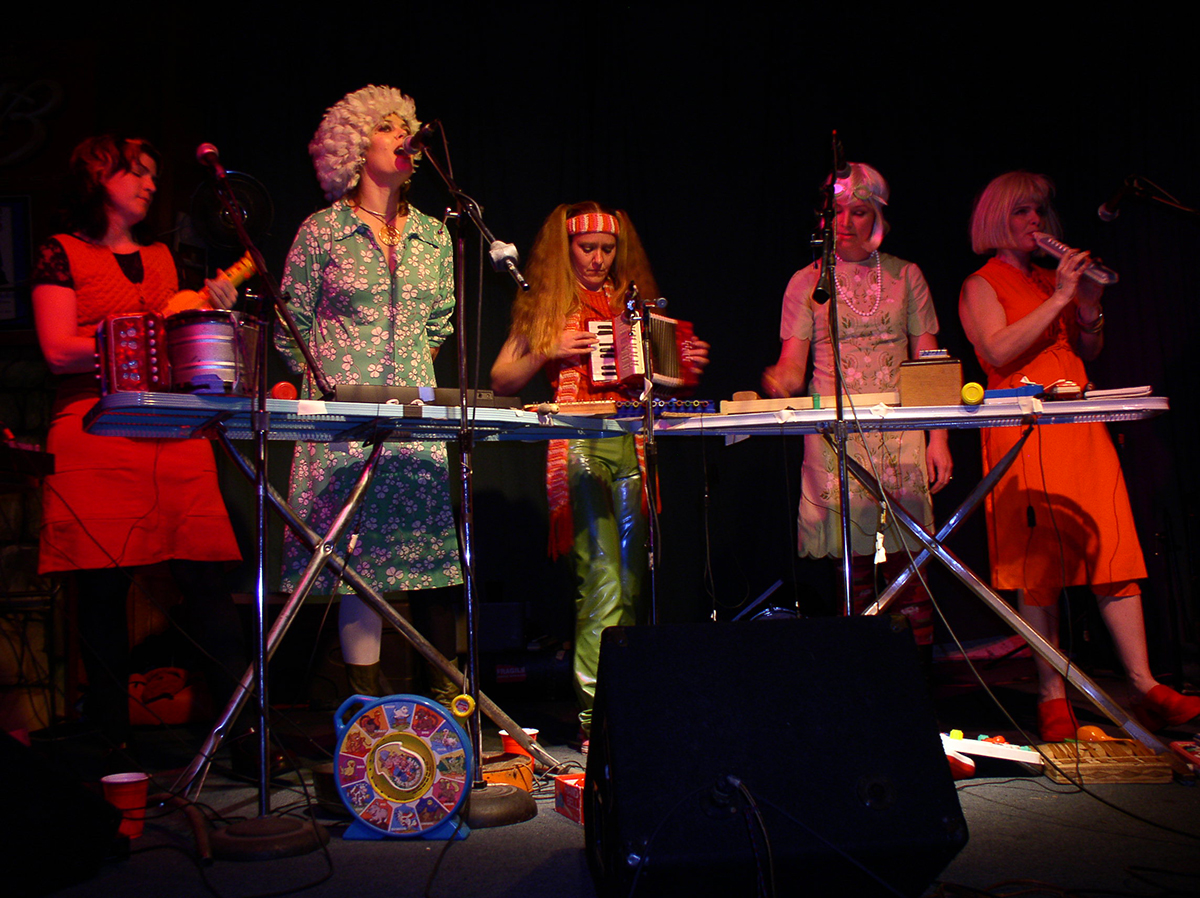
- Toychestra playing at the Starry Plough pub, Berkeley, Calif., 2005

Background information
- Origin: United States
- Genres: Experimental
- Years active: 1996–present
- Labels: S. K.
- Members: Angela Coon; Corey Weinstein; Lexa Walsh; Michelle Adams; Shari Robertson
- Past members: Carrie Lin; Paula Alexander
- Website: toychestra.com

Toychestra is an all-women experimental music group from Oakland, California that plays toys. They use toy musical instruments and other noise-making toys to perform their own compositions as well as interpretations of works by other artists, from Dvořák to Black Flag. Toychestra have performed at several venues in the San Francisco Bay Area and have toured Europe three times. They have released three CDs, including a collaborative album, What Leave Behind with English experimental guitarist Fred Frith.

== History ==
Toychestra began as a once-off experiment in 1996 at a women's festival of experimental music at Hotel Utah in San Francisco. Among the original members were Mary George, Paula Alexander, Lexa Walsh and Shari Robertson. Walsh described their first rehearsal: "we got together and brought our regular instruments, and I brought some toys too. We tried both, and the toys definitely won." They started improvising with the toys and within a two weeks they had put together a set.

Toychestra played at a variety of venues, from experimental music spaces and rock clubs, to schools and community centers. They arranged and performed "symphonic miniatures" using toy musical instruments, including tiny pianos, recorders, bugles, drum sets and xylophones, plus other noise making toys, like pink zoo trains and jack-in-the-boxes. They also used a variety of found objects for percussive sounds. Contact microphones were attached to each "instrument" for amplification and the feeds were mixed live during their performances. They dressed up in "dime-store costumes: bridal gowns, superhero outfits, and cowgirl regalia" with "future-shock hairdos and fluorescent wigs". The San Francisco Bay Guardian described Toychestra as an "ongoing experiment in naïve sound."

Composer Dan Plonsey from the San Francisco Bay Area Improv Scene first got to know Toychestra in 1998 when he booked them at his Beanbender's music venue in Berkeley, California. He liked their eccentric style and decided to combine their creative talents with those of fellow Bay Area Improv Scene member and experimental guitarist, Fred Frith. Plonsey wrote a concerto for electric guitar and toy orchestra for Toychestra and Frith to perform, and it was recorded and released in 2004 on a CD, What Leave Behind.

Toychestra went on to tour Europe several times, playing for the first time in large concert halls, and became quite popular in France. Later they began incorporating more conventional instruments like the melodica and kalimba to counteract the "shrillness" of the toy instruments.

Since their inception, Toychestra went through a number of personnel changes with founding member Walsh remaining at the helm. Their first two releases were both self-published, an eponymous 7" vinyl single in 1999, and a CD, Live in Leipzig in 2000. This was followed by three CDs on the French label, S.K. Records, including What Leave Behind with Frith.

== Discography ==
=== Albums ===
- Live in Leipzig a.k.a. An Evening of Charm (2000, CD)
- Sassy Pony (2002, CD, S.K. Records, France)
- My Good Side (2005, CD, S.K. Records, France)

With Fred Frith

- What Leave Behind (2004, CD, S.K. Records, France)

=== Singles ===
- "Toychestra" (1999, 7" vinyl)
