= All Is Bright, But It Is Not Day =

Live album by Fred Frith, Jean Derome, Pierre Tanguay and Myles Boisen
- Released: December 2002
- Recorded: February 18, 2001
- Venues: Guerrilla Recording studio, Oakland, California
- Genres: Avant-garde jazz; free improvisation
- Length: 61:04
- Label: Ambiances Magnétiques
- Producer: Fred Frith

Fred Frith chronology
Prints (2002)	All Is Bright, But It Is Not Day (2002)	Dalaba Frith Glick Rieman Kihlstedt (2003)

All Is Bright, But It Is Not Day is a 2002 live collaborative album of improvised avant-garde jazz by Fred Frith, Jean Derome, Pierre Tanguay and Myles Boisen. It was recorded live at the Guerrilla Recording studio in Oakland, California in February 2001, and was released in Canada by Ambiances Magnétiques in December 2002.

== Background ==
While Canadians saxophonist and flautist Jean Derome, and drummer Pierre Tanguay were touring the West Coast of the United States in February 2001, guitarist and multi-instrumentalist Fred Frith, a professor at Mills College in Oakland, California at the time, invited them to play with him at the institution. After the improvised performance, the three musicians relocated to Myles Boisen's Guerrilla Recording studio in Oakland to play there. Guitarist and sound engineer Boisen recorded their improvised performance live and manipulated the sound in real-time using the mixing desk and applying various digital treatments, including reverb and loops. Frith explained:

I allowed Myles free rein to do what he wanted with what we were playing by mixing it live and recording it directly to two-track. So as we were playing, we didn’t really know what the final product was going to sound like, even though there were no overdubs or anything else afterward.

The resulting album, All Is Bright, But It Is Not Day was recorded in a day, and released in December 2002 with Boisen credited as the album's fourth collaborator.

Coincidental with the album's release, the trio of Frith, Derome and Tanguay flew to Montreal, Canada in December 2002 to perform at La Sala Rossa and Le Va-et-vient. They improvised as they had done in Oakland for the album, but with Montreal-based sound engineer Bernard Grenon electronically manipulating the sound in real time.

== Reception ==
Reviewing All Is Bright, But It Is Not Day at AllMusic, François Couture noted the humor with which the musicians approached their free improvisation on the album. He said Frith is "witty, humorous, at times downright slashing" in the way he periodically interrupts the music with "outbursts of power chords". Tanguay indulges in "deconstructed rock to keep things on the edge of insanity", while Derome fills the soundscape using an assortment of found objects, including toys, ocarinas and game calls. Couture recalled Frank Zappa's quote, "Does humor belong in free improvisation?", and said, "Damn, one can only hope that it does: this CD makes a convincing argument."

Christian Carey wrote in Splendid E-Zine magazine that Jean Derome’s "maniacal laughter" at the beginning of the album tells us that "there is rough terrain ahead", but added that for listeners looking for something different, "this disc contains some fine material, played by strong exponents of the avant-garde". Influences appear to be some of the post-War electronic musicians, like Stockhausen and Varèse, and it even has shades of Zappa's Freak Out!. Carey concluded that the album has "tons of personality and a liberal dose of humor – both qualities sorely needed in today’s somber musical landscape."

In a review in The Wire, Julian Cowley described Frith's improvising on the album as "dissolv[ing] focal points [and] creating a continual sense of solidity melting into flow". Cowley said Frith's guitar swings from being "fiercely concentrated [to] nebulous and drifting ... leav[ing] little for the memory to cling to". Writing in the Montreal newspaper, Hour, Mike Chamberlain stated that the mood of the album is "dark funhouse ... with snatches of silliness ... whimsy ... and skronk". He said that as so often happens in improvisation, the results are "uneven", but added that "the high moments are high enough to make the wait worthwhile". In another Montreal newspaper, Voir, Gilles Tremblay described the album's music as "explosive, almost psychedelic" (explosive, presque psychédélique), but noted that it can be "challenging" (éprouvante) for the uninitiated, and recommended it to "discerning music lovers" (mélomanes avertis).

== Track listing ==
All tracks composed by Fred Frith, Jean Derome, Pierre Tanguay and Myles Boisen

No.	Title	Length
1.	"Heads Up"	8:05
2.	"Pachinko"	1:27
3.	"Landscape with Fire"	10:41
4.	"Ornettology"	1:38
5.	"Where Your Children Are"	9:18
6.	"Canadian Psycho"	7:09
7.	"Cutting to the Chase"	14:58
8.	"Élégie Électrique"	7:48

Sources: Liner notes

== Personnel ==
- Fred Frith – electric guitar, voice
- Jean Derome – flute, alto saxophone, ocarina, Casio keyboards, harmonica, game calls, finger percussion, Jew's harp, megaphone, voice
- Pierre Tanguay – drums, found objects, harmonica, Jew's harp, voice
- Myles Boisen – recording engineer, real-time sound manipulation

=== Production and artwork ===
- Recorded live by Myles Boisen at the Guerrilla Recording studio, Oakland, California on February 18, 2001
- Mastered by Myles Boisen at Headless Buddha Mastering Labs, Oakland, California on September 12, 2001
- Produced by Fred Frith
- Executive production by Joane Hétu
- Cover photography by Heike Liss
- Graphic design by Fabrizio Gilardino

Sources: Liner notes
