= Made Subandi =

Indonesian composer (1966–2023)

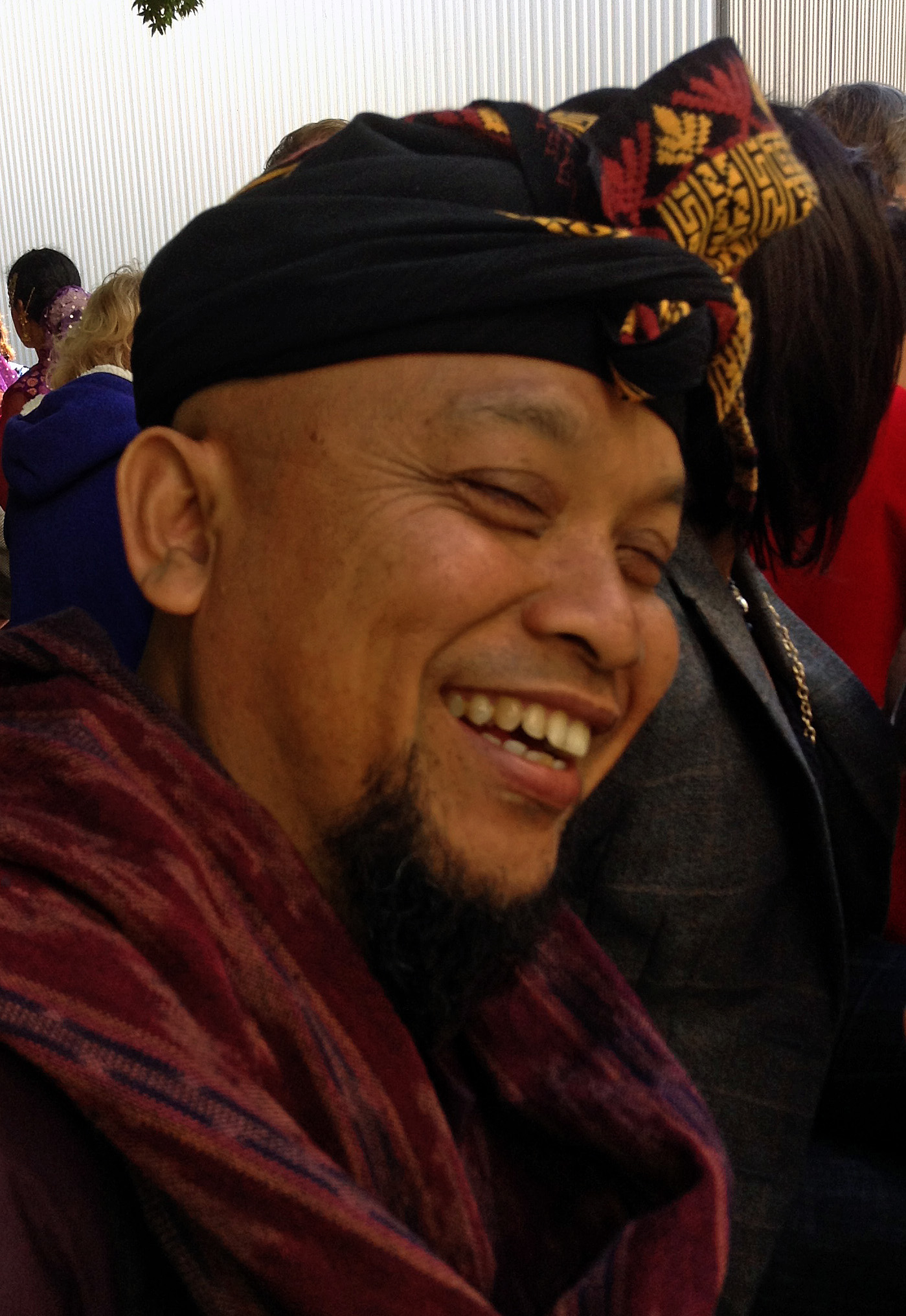
Subandi in 2013

I Made Subandi (February 1966 – October 16, 2023) was an Indonesian gamelan composer and performer from Gianyar, Bali.

Subandi studied with his father, the drummer and gender wayang player I Made Dig, and at SMKI (1985-1988) and STSI (1989-1993). He teaches at the Indonesian Academy of Performing Arts in Bali.

Subandi's compositions include Bajramusti (1997). In 1999, during his residency with Gamelan Sekar Jaya, he composed a soundtrack for the 1933 silent film Legong: Dance of the Virgins with the American composer Richard Marriott, scored for Balinese gamelan, string quartet, trumpet and clarinet. He has also collaborated with the Dutch trio Boi Akih and American ensemble Club Foot Orchestra.

Subandi is well known for his use of experimentation. Michael Tenzer describes him as one of a few composers who "have achieved a self-conscious and fundamental break with the tabuh kreasi form of the recent past".
