= Dan Plonsey =

American musician

Dan Plonsey (born September 1, 1958 in Cleveland, Ohio) is an American saxophonist. Although often associated with jazz, he has expressed disagreement with being categorized strictly within the genre.

== Career ==
His main influences were Sun Ra and Anthony Braxton, both connected to but "apart from" the jazz world. A short solo saxophone piece can be found on the (Y)Earbook, Volume One CD (1991, Rastascan Records), which also features music from guitarist Henry Kaiser and percussionist Greg Bendian, among others.

He received his degree from Yale University and won a commission from Bang on a Can in 1999. Also in 1999, Plonsey toured the Netherlands with Steve Horowitz' Mousetrap Quartet, alongside of reed players Peter van Bergen and Michael Moore. While in the Netherlands, he engaged in one-off improvised music concerts with The Amsterdam String Trio and trumpeter Eric Boeren among others.

Two notable CDs with John and Peter Hinds of "Sun Ra Research" fame were released on the tiny Omni Sonic label in 1994 and 1995: Connections and Another Curiosity Piece. Typically, his infrequent recording output consists mostly of self-produced material or extremely limited editions by connaisseur record labels like Limited Sedition.

A 1997 solo CD called Ivory Bill on the American Music and Arts label highlights Plonsey's use of multiple saxophones, mostly recorded by overdubbing two or more saxophones in the recording studio. Plonsey's 1999 album open door and desire, released on the Italian Felmay label, can be seen as a further volume of solo saxophone experiments with occasionally added keyboards, played and programmed by Plonsey himself.

In 2003, Plonsey wrote What Leave Behind, a concerto for electric guitar and toy orchestra, for the Oakland, California-based experimental music group Toychestra and English experimental guitarist Fred Frith to perform. A recording was released on CD in 2004.

Other productions include the opera Leave Me Alone! with Real Time Opera.

== Organizational work ==
Dan Plonsey, like Gino Robair, is also noted for his organizational contributions to the music world. Before focusing on operatic composition, he was one of the leading members of the Bay Area Improv Scene, particularly during his time at the Beanbenders music venue.
