= Hotel Utah =

The Hotel Utah may refer to:

- Hotel Utah, San Francisco, California
- Hotel Utah, now known as the Joseph Smith Memorial Building, Salt Lake City, Utah
