= The Union Trade =

American indie rock band

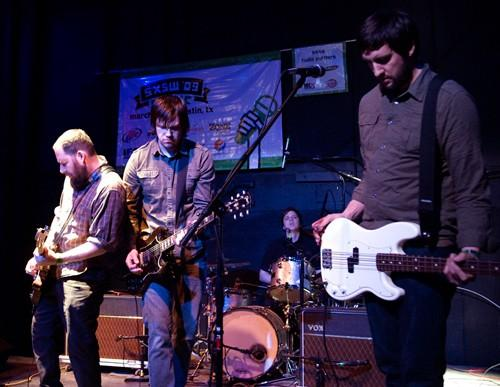
- The Union Trade, SXSW 2009. Left to right: Eric Salk, Don Joslin, Dan Rodkewich, Nate Munger

Background information
- Origin: San Francisco, California, United States
- Genres: Indie rock, post-rock
- Years active: 2006-present
- Labels: Tricycle Records
- Members: Don Joslin (guitar); Nate Munger (bass, vocals); Eric Salk (guitar, keyboards); Eitan Anzenberg
- Past members: David Elrod (drums); Dan Rodkewich (drums)
- Website: http://theuniontrade.com

The Union Trade is an American Indie rock band formed in San Francisco, California, in 2006. An early and leading member of the Bay Area post-rock scene, The Union Trade is also the founding band of San Francisco independent music label, Tricycle Records. Since its inception, the band's line-up has included Nate Munger (lead vocals, bass), Don Joslin (guitar), and Eric Salk (vocals, guitar, keys). The founding drummer was Dan Rodkewich. The band's current drummer, Eitan Anzenberg, has been with the band since 2012.

== History ==
The Union Trade's first live performance was an unpublicized show on August 19, 2006, played before a small group of friends and family in the upstairs back room of Edinburgh Castle, a San Francisco pub and music venue. Prior to The Union Trade, Don Joslin and Nate Munger were in an instrumental band together called The Andrea Doria. In an interview with the San Francisco Chronicle, Joslin described the first six months of the Union Trade as "exciting for all of us ... The vision came first, then the band set out to develop the sound ... In the end, we have all reached a place musically that none of us would have reached alone." The first official live performance of the band was at another SF venue, Hotel Utah, on September 26, 2006. The band has since shared the stage with notable national and international acts like The Appleseed Cast, The Morning Benders, Neon Trees, Film School, Vetiver, Pela, Figurines, The Pack A.D., Starlight Mints, Dappled Cities, Polysics, Loquat, and LoveLikeFire.

The Union Trade made their recording debut in February 2007 with the release of their first EP, Now the Swell, on Tricycle Records. This EP was also the first release on the label which guitarist Don Joslin co-founded with San Francisco music photographer, Julie Schucard. The follow-up full-length album, Everyday Including, also released on Tricycle, came out in August 2008. Smother Magazine called it "a transcendental album awash in guitar fuzzy logic and hugely catchy triumphs. Simply amazing and simply essential" and the UK music blog The Beat Surrender ranked it No. 32 of its Top 50 albums for 2008. The Union Trade's EP Why We Need Night, was released on February 8, 2011, and received recognition as a notable release from music publications such as the KEXP blog, Indie Rock Cafe, Largehearted Boy, and Faronheit. The San Francisco music blog Kata Rokkar calls Why We Need Night "A moody but gorgeous EP infused with youthful sincerity, it is cinematic in scope with soothing soundscapes of atmospheric, ambient, and shimmering chimes interspersed with crashing interludes...This isn't average post rock that drags and bores the listener, this is tight and well thought out songs that burst with color and expand with repeated listens." Their most recent release is a remix EP called Translations.

As members of the local San Francisco indie rock scene, The Union Trade have played multiple live shows at local venues including six at Bottom of the Hill, Cafe Du Nord, and Rickshaw Stop. They also performed as part of the San Francisco indie music festival Noise Pop in 2007 and 2008. In 2008 and 2009 The Union Trade traveled to Austin, Texas, to perform in the Bay Area Takeover, a Bay Area music scene showcase sponsored by Tricycle Records and the music blog The Bay Bridged during the South by Southwest (SXSW) music festival. In 2009, they were also selected as an official showcasing band at SXSW. In a review from the release show of Everyday Including, West Coast Performer magazine described The Union Trade's live set as a "heavy-hitting somber sound" with "a hauntingly sustaining wail over jagged vocals and pulsating rhythms set by the band's aggressive drummer and bassist."

The Union Trade have been placed in regular rotation on several internet radio outlets, including, Pandora Radio, Spotify, Rdio, somaFM's indie pop rocks, and Last.fm.

A Place of Long Years was recorded after a three-year hiatus that followed the release of their last studio release, the 2011 EP Why We Need Night. According to their label, Tricycle Records The band took a new approach, writing without a drummer for the first time. The result of this approach was a, quieter process that involved the founding members Don Joslin, Nate Munger and Eric Salk. The songs that would become A Place of Long Years began as an entirely instrumental set of songs. Once drummer Eitan Anzenberg was added the song took on their final form. The record was recorded at San Francisco's historic Different Fur Studio. In-studio contributions on the album were made by Tricycle labelmates Nate Blaz on Cello (Geographer) and Ann Yu (Silver Swans) on vocals. It was released on February 3, 2015 on Tricycle Records.

== Musical style and influences ==
The Union Trade is most widely associated with the post-rock and shoegaze genres. Designating themselves "cinematic post-rock", the band describes their sound as bridging the typically instrumental rock sounds of influences such as Mogwai, Explosions in the Sky, This Will Destroy You, with the highly effected guitar and vocal sounds of bands like The Appleseed Cast, Ride, Slowdive, and Swervedriver.

== Discography ==
- A Place of Long Years LP (2015)
- Translations Remix EP (2013)
- Why We Need Night EP (2011)
- Everyday Including LP (2008)
- Now The Swell EP (2007)

== Band members ==
- Don Joslin - guitar (2006–present) founding member
- Nate Munger - bass guitar (2006–present) founding member
- Eric Salk - guitar / keyboard (2006–present) founding member
- Dan Rodkewich - drums (2006 - 2010) founding member
- David Elrod - drums (2010–2011)
- Eitan Anzenberg – drums (2013–present)
