= Susanna Lindeborg =

Swedish jazz pianist, flautist and composer

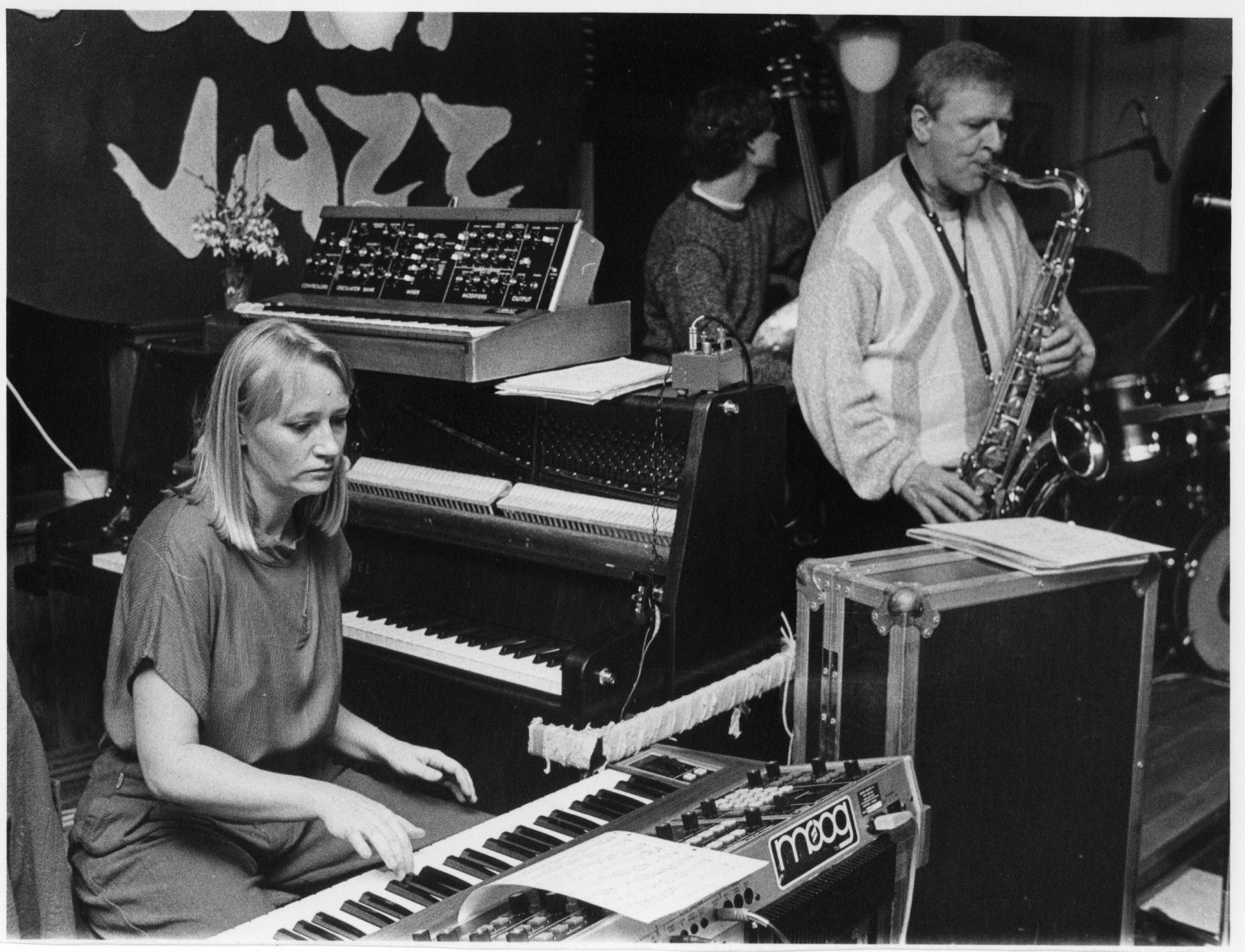
- Born: 18 April 1952 (age 74); Halmstad, Sweden
- Known for: Leader of Mwendo Dawa.
- Style: Classic

Susanna Lindeborg (born April 18, 1952, in Halmstad) is a Swedish jazz pianist, flautist and composer, leader of the group Mwendo Dawa. She also was a member of female group the Jazz group Salamander.

== Career ==
Susanna Lindeborg was born on April 18, 1952, in Halmstad Sweden. After taking classical piano lessons in the early 1970s, Lindeborg discovered jazz, which became an important source of inspiration for her. In 1974, she founded the quintet Mwendo Dawa with saxophonist Ove Johansson. With this group, for which she writes a large part of the repertoire, she went on many world tours and performed at the Montreux Jazz Festival, the North Sea Jazz Festival and the Montreal Jazz Festival. She performed in Europe, Asia, North and South America. By 2018, she had released 21 albums with Mwendo Dawa.

In addition, Lindeborg toured extensively in the early 1980s with the all-female jazz band Salamander, with whom she performed in Europe and the USA. In 1989 she took part in the SWF's New Jazz Meeting. In the same year she released her first solo album Susanna Lindeborg solo. In recent years she has also performed in the Lindeborg/Johansson Duo and then in the trio Natural Artefacts, with which she moved towards electroacoustic improvisational music. Together with Per Anders Nilsson, Merje Kägu and Anton Jonsson, this resulted in the improvisation quartet Natural Artefacts, which released the album The Crux in 2018.

She also gives solo concerts in which she uses computers to create electroacoustic backgrounds. In 2011 she was nominated for the Nordic Council Music Prize. Since 2012 she has been curating a concert series in her home Region Halland called INES presenting new music.

In 1989 she started the record label LJRecords together with her husband Saxophone player Ove Johansson.

== Discography ==
Mwendo Dawa

- "Basic Lines” (Sonet 1978 with Ove Johansson, Ulf Wakenius, Anders Jormin, David Sundby)
- "Live at Montreux” (Dragon 1979 with Ove Johansson, Ulf Wakenius, Anders Jormin, David Sundby)
- "Mwendo Dawa 80” (Dragon 1980 with Ove Johansson, Ulf Wakenius, Anders Jormin, David Sundby)
- "Free Lines” (Dragon 1981 with Ove Johansson, Anders Jormin, David Sundby)
- "New York Lines” (Dragon 1982 with Ove Johansson, Lars Danielsson, David Sundby)
- "Four Voices” (Dragon 1983 with Ove Johansson, Lars Danielsson, David Sundby)
- "Street Lines” (Dragon 1984 with Ove Johansson, Lars Danielsson, David Sundby)
- "Mwendo Dawa at Northsea Jazzfestival” (Dragon 1984 with Ove Johansson, Lars Danielsson, David Sundby)
- "City Beat” (Dragon 1985 with Ove Johansson, Lars Danielsson, David Sundby)
- ”Dimensions" (Dragon 1986 with Ove Johansson, Stefan Pettersson, David Sundby)
- "Human Walk” (Dragon 1987 with Ove Johansson, Stefan Pettersson, David Sundby)
- “Live is here again” (LJ Records 1990 with Ove Johansson, Sergei Muchin, David Sundby)
- "The New Scene” (LJ Records 1993 with Ove Johansson, Sergei Muchin, David Sundby)
- "Enter the outloop” (LJ Records 1998 with Ove Johansson, Jimmi Roger Pedersen, David Sundby)
- ”Breathing Clusters” (LJ Records1995 with Ove Johansson, Jimmi Roger Pedersen, David Sundby)
- "Live in Göteborg” (LJ Records 2001 with Ove Johansson, Jimmi Roger Pedersen, David Sundby)
- "time sign” (LJ Records 2003 with Ove Johansson, Jimmi Roger Pedersen, David Sundby)
- "Live at Fasching (LJ Records 2005 with Ove Johansson, Jimmi Roger Pedersen, David Sundby)
- "A taste of four free minds” (LJRecords 2007 with Ove Johansson, Jimmi Roger Pedersen, David Sundby)
- “Mwendo Dawa Orgelsommer 2007” )Infraserve Europeischer Jazz 2007 live rec Frankfurt with Ove Johansson, Jimmi Roger Pedersen, David Sundby)
- “Mwendo Dawa Music” (LJRecords 2012 with Ove Johansson, Jimmi Roger Pedersen, David Sundby)
- “Silent Voice” (LJRecords 2018 with Jimmi Roger Pedersen, David Sundby)

Susanna Lindeborg / Ove Johansson Duo

- ”Bright Openings” (LJ Records 1991 with Ove Johansson)
- ”Structures" (LJ Records 1999 with Ove Johansson)
- ”Lines" (LJ Records 2005 with Ove Johansson)
- ”Thoughtful World” (LJ Records 2010 with Ove Johansson)
- ”NaturalArtefacts” (LJ Records 2001 with Ove Johansson, PerAnders Nilsson)
- "Like Jazz” (LJ Records 2006 with Ove Johansson, PerAnders Nilsson)
- “California Connection” (LJRecords 2014 with Ove Johansson, PerAnders Nilsson, Tim Perkis, Gino Robair)

Solo

- *Susanna Lindeborg solo” (LJRecords 1989)
- "Key Paintings” (LJRecords 2001)
- “Excursions” (LJRecords 2010)

Natural Artefacts

- ”NaturalArtefacts” (LJ Records 2001 with Ove Johansson, PerAnders Nilsson)
- "Like Jazz” (LJ Records 2006 with Ove Johansson, PerAnders Nilsson)
- “California Connection” (LJRecords 2014 with Ove Johansson, PerAnders Nilsson, Tim Perkis, Gino Robair)
- “The Crux” (LJRecords 2018 with PerAnders Nilsson, Merje Kägu, Anton Jonsson)
- ”Signs and Symbols” (LJRecords 2024 with PerAnders Nilsson, Merje Kägu, Anton Jonsson, Thomas Jäderlund)

Suden Meeting

- ”Sudden Meeting” (LJRecords 2014 with Ove Johansson, Thomas Fanto, Michael Andersson)
- ”Second Occasion” (LJRecords 2020 with Thomas Fanto, Michael Andersson)

Salamander

- ”Live at Northsea Jazz Festival” (Dragon 1981 with Cecilia Wennerström, Katarina Karlsson, Stig Boström, Vanja Holm)
- ”In the darkest month” (Dragon 1982 with Cecilia Wennerström, Stig Boström, Vanja Holm)

== Awards ==
- Gothenburg City Art Grant 1983
- Hallandsposten Arts Grant 2001
- Halmstad City Art Price 2010.
- 2011 nominated for the Nordic Council Music Price
- 2013 Cultural Price of Region Halland, Sweden.
- 2016 Jazzkannan
