= Dalaba Frith Glick Rieman Kihlstedt =

Album by Lesli Dalaba, Fred Frith, Eric Glick Rieman and Carla Kihlstedt

Studio album by Lesli Dalaba, Fred Frith, Eric Glick Rieman and Carla Kihlstedt
- Released: 2003
- Studios: Guerrilla Recording, Oakland, California
- Genres: Experimental music, free improvisation
- Length: 55:38
- Label: Accretions (US)
- Producer: Eric Glick Rieman

Fred Frith chronology
All Is Bright, But It Is Not Day (2002)	Dalaba Frith Glick Rieman Kihlstedt (2003)	Rivers and Tides (2003)

Dalaba Frith Glick Rieman Kihlstedt, also stylized as DalabaFrithGlickRiemanKihlstedt, is a 2003 studio album of improvised experimental music by Lesli Dalaba, Fred Frith, Eric Glick Rieman and Carla Kihlstedt. It was recorded at Guerrilla Recording in Oakland, California, and was released by Accretions Records in San Diego, California in 2003.

The quartet was first proposed by Glick Rieman to Frith, with whom he had worked at Mills College in Oakland. Frith added Dalaba to the project, and Glick Rieman, Frith and Dalaba performed with John Zorn at Derek Bailey's Incus Festival at Tonic in New York City. Kihlstedt joined the trio later at the suggestion of Glick Rieman, and the quartet's first performance was at Myles Boisen's Guerrilla Recording studio in Oakland.

== Reception ==
Professional ratings
Review scores
Source	Rating
AllMusic	3/5 stars
All About Jazz	favorable

In a review of the album at AllMusic, François Couture wrote that there is "[a] beautiful level of understanding" between the four musicians, and that while the music is improvised, it "sounds deeply structured". He praised "Worm Anvils", which he described as "long, slow, delicate, and full of mesmerizing sounds, courtesy of Glick Rieman". Couture felt that while this album is not as "absorbing" as other Frith collaborative albums from the time, for example Digital Wildlife with Maybe Monday, it "still provides a very rewarding listen".

Frank Rubolino in All About Jazz called the album an "eclectic mirage" with "animated gaiety countered with sadness", and moods swinging from "stark depression to overt jubilation". Writing in Exposé, Jeff Melton described the album as "seven dialogs ... each winding up in a dark alley alone with no explanation". He felt the strongest track was "Shallow Weather", with its "Derek Bailey styled introduction into a jazz malaise". Melton said fans of Frith's collaborations with Chris Cutler will appreciate this recording.

== Track listing ==
All music by Lesli Dalaba, Fred Frith, Eric Glick Rieman and Carla Kihlstedt.

No.	Title	Length
1.	"How Light, a Potato Chip"	2:17
2.	"The Distance That Separates Dreams"	2:44
3.	"Spicule Maneuver"	4:07
4.	"Worm Anvils"	12:59
5.	"Shallow Weather"	11:57
6.	"Lucy Has a New Pet Kitty"	5:17
7.	"Ant Farm Morning"	16:02

Sources: Liner notes, Discogs, Fred Frith discography.

== Personnel ==
- Lesli Dalaba – trumpet
- Fred Frith – guitar, maniacal laughter
- Eric Glick Rieman – prepared and extended Rhodes electric piano
- Carla Kihlstedt – violin, electric violin, Stroh violin

Sources: Liner notes, Discogs, Fred Frith discography.

=== Sound and artwork ===
- Recorded and mixed at Guerrilla Recording, Oakland, California
- Engineered and mixed by Myles Boisen
- Mastered by Jeff Karsin
- Produced by Eric Glick Rieman
- Painting by Shelley Hoyt
- Design by Marcos Fernandes

Sources: Liner notes, Discogs.
