= STSI =

STSI can refer to:

- Space Telescope Science Institute, NASA-sponsored institute at Johns Hopkins University
- Sekolah Tinggi Seni Indonesia (disambiguation), several arts universities in Indonesia
