= Boi Akih =

Dutch jazz/world music trio

- Origin: Amsterdam, Netherlands
- Genres: World, jazz
- Years active: 1997–present
- Labels: Enja, EMI
- Members: Monica Akihary, Niels Brouwer
- Website: boiakih.com

Boi Akih is a jazz/world music duo based in Amsterdam, Netherlands, and composed of Monica Akihary on vocals and Niels Brouwer on guitar. Boi Akih has worked with other musicians such as Ernst Reijseger (cello), Eric Calmes (bass), Ernst Glerum (bass), Sean Bergin (sax), Sandip Bhattacharya (tabla), Made Subandi (gamelan), Onno Govaert (drums), Tobias Klein (reeds) and Ryoko Imai (marimba, perc.) The group combines musical traditions from the Molucca Islands, Bali, Dutch jazz, improvised music, Indian classical music, and traditional African music. Music is written by Brouwer and lyrics are written by Brouwer and Akihary.

== History ==
Sandip Bhattachraya studied with Pandit Ishwar Lal Misra in the style of tabla musician Pandit Anokhelal Misra and has performed with Pandit Hariprasad Chaurasia, Prabha Atre, Lakshmi Shankar, Shujaat Hussain Khan, Ustad Munawar Ali Khan, and Tarun Bhattacharya. Niels Brouwer studied at the Hilversums Conservatorium (Conservatorium van Amsterdam) Monica Akihary is a graduate of visual arts studies in Amsterdam and Yogyakarta (Akademi Seni Rupa). Both studied classical Indian music in Bangalore (2002) and Mumbai (2004).

Akihary writes and sings in her father's native language, which has been regarded as moribund. Since 1998 Brouwer and Akihary have been working with Dutch and Australian linguists who study Haruku language.

They invited gamelan musician Made Subandi to perform on Philosophy of Love (2010). Boi Akih has worked with Michael Vatcher, Ernst Reijseger, Ernst Glerum, Owen Hart Jr., Sean Bergin, and Wolter Wierbos. Boi Akih has performed at the Berlin Jazz Festival, Kaunas Jazz Festival, and Bimhuis. They have also appeared on VPRO, France2, Radio France, BBC, ORF, and RTL 4.

== Discography ==
- 1997: Boi Akih (Invitation/EMI, 1997)
- 2000: Above the Clouds, Among the Roots (A Records, 2000)
- 2003: Uwa i (Enja, 2004)
- 2005: Lagu Lagu (Boiakih, 2005)
- 2007: Yalelol (Enja, 2007)
- 2012: Circles in a Square Society
- 2016: Liquid Songs
- 2017: Lagu Lagu 2
- 2020: Storyteller (BROMO Sena)
- 2023: From and to Infinity
