= Club Foot Orchestra =

American musical ensemble

- Origin: San Francisco, California, U.S.
- Years active: 1983 – present
- Labels: Ralph Records, Heyday, Rastascan
- Members: Will Bernard; Sheldon Brown; Beth Custer; Kymry Esainko; Chris Grady; Sascha Jacobsen; Richard Marriott; Deirdre McClure; Gino Robair; Alisa Rose
- Past members: Dave Barrett; Myles Boisen; Joshua Brody; Matt Brubeck; Catharine Clune; Steed Cowart; Richard Egner; Josh Ende; Eric Drew Feldman; Opter Flame; Kaila Flexer; Elliot Kavee; Steve Kirk; Dave Kopplin; Bob Lipton; Jason Marsh; Doug Morton; Nik Phelps; Julian Smedley; Snakefinger; Kenny Wollesen; Arny Young
- Website: clubfootorchestra.com

The Club Foot Orchestra is a musical ensemble known for their silent film scores. Their influences include Eastern European folk music, impressionism, and jazz fusion; The New Yorker described their style as "music that bubbles up from the intersection of aesthetics and the id."

Their performance venues have included Lincoln Center for the Performing Arts, Symphony Space, the Smithsonian Institution, the Winter Garden Atrium, the SFJAZZ Center, and San Francisco's Castro Theatre, considered their home base.

== History ==
In the 1980s, musician Richard Marriott lived above a performance art nightclub, the Club Foot, in Dogpatch, San Francisco; with Beth Custer, he founded a house band, the Club Foot Orchestra. On Ralph Records, the band released Wild Beasts and Kidnapped. According to the band's website as of 2021, both Custer and Marriott still play with the ensemble, with Marriott also functioning as creative and artistic director.

== Current members ==
- Beth Custer, clarinets, keyboard
- Sheldon Brown, woodwinds
- Chris Grady, trumpet
- Richard Marriott, brass, woodwinds
- Gino Robair, percussion
- Will Bernard, guitar
- Kymry Esainko, piano
- Alisa Rose, violin
- Sascha Jacobson, double bass
- Deirdre McClure, conductor

== Silent-film scoring ==
The Club Foot Orchestra is known for their live accompaniment to silent films, including features and shorts of widespread genres. The scores are written collaboratively, in a process they describe as "a fundamental element in their unique musical style." They also perform music in other genres, such as Custer's score for choreographer Joe Goode's Maverick Strain performance installation and Marriott's scores for Della Davidson's Ten PM Dream and Eva Luna.

Marriott explained how they started writing for movies:

I became interested in doing something visually that further expressed the ideas behind the music; something that would help put the music in context. I considered projecting slides of experimental art on a screen behind us. Then a friend suggested, after catching our show: "The music is so cinematic, why don't you take outtakes of 1950s sitcoms and score them." I put it under my hat.

Later that night I saw a Lily Tomlin skit on Saturday Night Live. She was reading the Dow Jones averages of various art trends. She reported, "Pop art up 10... Op art up 20... Expressionism down 30." I turned the channel. And there was The Cabinet of Dr. Caligari. The distorted sets and dreamlike atmosphere in the film were the qualities that I always envisioned accompanying our music. The subversive plot was drenched in the unconscious. I was obsessed to write for that film.

Marriott's score premiered at the 1987 Mill Valley Film Festival. After touring with Caligari, Marriott wrote a score for the 1922 F. W. Murnau horror classic Nosferatu, with sections contributed by Gino Robair, introducing the period of collaborative composition. Nosferatu is a powerful and evocative score and proved equally successful with audiences, and led to an appearance at New Music America in New York City in 1989. Over the next 10 years, new scores for the films Metropolis, Sherlock Jr., Pandora's Box and The Hands of Orlac were composed by the group and performed throughout the US, following their premieres at the Castro Theater. Many short subject films were also composed during this time.

Francis Lederer, who played Alwa Schön in Pandora's Box, attended a screening of that film in 1995 at the Nuart Theater in Los Angeles. Buster Keaton's wife Eleanor attended a screening of Sherlock Jr. in 1993, and exclaimed, "Bravo Club Foot Orchestra! Buster would have loved your music."

In 1999, a smaller version of the orchestra, along with Gamelan Sekar Jaya, performed with the film Legong: Dance of the Virgins, co-written by Marriott and Indonesian composer Made Subandi. More recently, the group has performed new scores for Battleship Potemkin, Phantom of the Opera and Go West, in addition to Marriott's reworking of Metropolis to match the newly restored and much longer print. Three new Buster Keaton short-subject films (The Blacksmith, One Week, Cops) were showcased in a Club Foot Orchestra retrospective hosted by the San Francisco Silent Film Festival at the Castro Theater in September 2018.

The Club Foot Gamelan premiered a score for the silent Indonesian film Goona Goona at the 2019 San Francisco Silent Film Festival, featuring the Balinese virtuosos Nyoman Windha and Dewa Barata. In 2019–2020, the Club Foot Modern Machines has been performing yet another new score for Metropolis, this time featuring kinetic sound-producing sculptures created by Matt Heckert, Kal Spelletich, and Obtainium Works.

== Twisted Tales of Felix the Cat ==
In 1995, the Club Foot Orchestra scored and recorded the first season of the CBS cartoon series The Twisted Tales of Felix the Cat, produced by Film Roman. Gino Robair produced the cartoon's soundtrack, which was recorded at Hyde Street Studios in San Francisco and later at Guerilla Euphonics in Oakland. All members of the group, which at the time included Myles Boisen, Matt Brubeck, Catherine Clune, Chris Grady, Steve Kirk, Nik Phelps, and Elliot Kavee, wrote music for these episodes.

== Film scores (features) ==
- The Cabinet of Dr. Caligari (1987, Composer: Marriott)
- Nosferatu (1989, Composers: Marriott, Robair)
- Metropolis (Moroder edit) (1991, Composers: Marriott, Kirk, Brown, Phelps, Boisen, Custer)
- Sherlock Jr. (1992, Composers: Marriott, Boisen, Kirk, Brown, Custer, Phelps)
- Pandora's Box (1995, Composers: Marriott, Brown, Boisen, Brubeck, Kirk, Custer, Phelps, Kavee)
- The Hands of Orlac (1997, Composers: Marriott, Brown, Robair)
- Legong: Dance of the Virgins (1999, Composers: Marriott, Subandi)
- Battleship Potemkin (2005, Composer: Marriott)
- Phantom of the Opera (2005, Composer: Marriott)
- Metropolis (Complete) (2013, Composer: Marriott)
- Go West (2015, Composers: Marriott, Custer, Brown)

== Film scores (shorts and smaller ensembles) ==
- Entr'acte (1989, Composer: Satie; Arrangers: Cowart, McClure)
- Pool of Thanatos (1991, Composer: Custer)
- Felix the Cat Woos Whoopee (1992, Composer: Club Foot Orchestra)
- Koko Convict (1992, Composer: Kirk)
- How a Mosquito Operates (1992, Composer: Boisen)
- Cops (1993, Composers: Kirk, Brown, Boisen)
- The Idea (1993, Composer: Phelps)
- Steamboat Bill (2011, Composer: Marriott)
- The Golem (2011, Composers: Brown, Rose, Marriott)
- The Godless Girl (2011, Composer: Marriott)
- One Week (2018, Composer: Marriott)
- The Blacksmith (2018, Composer: Custer)
- Cops (new score) (2018, Composer: Brown)
- Goona Goona (2019, Composer: Marriott)

== Discography ==
- Wild Beasts, 1986 (Vinyl), Ralph Records, San Francisco
- Kidnapped, 1987 (Vinyl), Ralph Records, San Francisco
- The Cabinet of Dr. Caligari, 1988 (Cassette/VHS), Ralph Records, San Francisco
- Nosferatu, 1989 (Cassette/VHS), Ralph Records, San Francisco
- Metropolis (live recording), 1991 (CD), Heyday Records, San Francisco
- Kidnapped, Wild Beasts & More, reissue 1995 (compilation CD), Rastascan
- Sherlock Jr. & Felix 1995 (CD), Rastascan
- Plays Nino Rota: Selections from la Dolce Vita, Amarcord, Nights of Cabiria, 8½, Rastascan
- Nosferatu Live at the World Financial Center January 25, 2001 (CD), Conceptual Noise, San Francisco
- Legong: Dance of the Virgins, 2004 (DVD), Milestone, New York
- Legong: Dance of the Virgins, Live Recording, 2013 (CD), Conceptual Noise, San Francisco
