= Real Time Opera =

Real Time Opera (RTO) is a performing arts organization dedicated to the production of new opera. Founded in 2002, it is based in Contoocook, New Hampshire and Oberlin, Ohio and produces opera across the United States, engaging professional singers and a range of instrumental ensembles for performances at a wide variety of venues.

== Past Productions ==
The first season in 2003 presented a workshop of Korczak's Orphans by Adam Silverman and Susan Gubernat based on the life of the famous Polish children's doctor, orphanage director and Holocaust martyr, Janusz Korczak. It was performed at the Lebanon Opera House in New Hampshire and in May 2004 was presented at New York City Opera as part of VOX 2004: Showcasing American Composers. It continues to have workshopped performances at Opera Theatre of Brooklyn.

Hawaiian Tan Ratface with words and music by John Trubee was premiered in February, 2004, at San Francisco's Studio Z, accompanied by the Ugly Janitors of America with choreography by Carl Franzoni.

Feynman is a new opera by composer Jack Vees, Operations Director of the Yale Center for Studies in Music Technology, and librettist Paul Schick. Its subject is the Nobel Prize-winning physicist and cult figure Richard Feynman. A percussion quartet provides the orchestra backing a solo Dr. Feynman onstage. The premiere was performed at the Norfolk Chamber Music Festival, CT, in June 2005, and subsequent tour of New England was performed by SO Percussion and baritone Michael Cavalieri. In December 2005, Feynman was restaged in New York City at the Knitting Factory, with lighting and video design by Barry Steele and scenery design by Damen Mroczek. Future performances are in planning.

Leave me Alone! was written by Dan Plonsey to a new libretto by Harvey Pekar who is perhaps best known for his series of autobiographical comic books and the subsequent movie: American Splendor. It premiered January 31, 2009 at Oberlin College.

RTO premiered four Pop-Up Operas in their 2012–2013 season, all designed by Cleveland artist Don Harvey, filmed and edited by Ted Sikora for online presentation. The first, Double Figure, is a translation of a Paul Celan poem by Paul Schick, performed outside Cleveland Public Theater in November 2012, starring Phil Wong (tenor) and Elaine Daiber (soprano).

Frozen Community premiered on Main Street Oberlin, Ohio in May 2013 composed by Randy Woolf with text by Robin Stranahan, music by The Bits, and dance/choreography by Ladia Yates.

Silent Chorus by David Mahler was performed in Pittsburgh, PA in June 2013 by Stephen Ng (tenor)

Paradox is an American Sign Language opera composed by Larry Polansky to a text by Patrick Graybill, performed by Monique Holt with interpretation by Tim Chamberlain, music performed by Daniel Goode, Randall Chaves-Camacho and Dan King in August 2013.

NOVA is composed by Lewis Nielson to a libretto by Paul Schick, directed by Jonathon Field and premiered during Cleveland Public Theater’s Big Box series 2014.

== Additional Works and Commissions ==
A House in Bali an opera by composer Evan Ziporyn and librettist Paul Schick, first produced in 2009. A House in Bali is based on the autobiographical book by Canadian composer Colin McPhee. Performances in New York City, San Francisco, Boston and Bali have combined the traditional Balinese gamelan and dancers with Western musicians from the Bang on a Can All-Stars.

Hu Tong is an opera composed by Kui Dong to a libretto by Paul Schick, based on a book by Monica Datta. It's slated to premiere in 2019.
