= Twin Peaks: Fire Walk with Me (soundtrack) =

Twin Peaks: Fire Walk With Me

Soundtrack album by Angelo Badalamenti
- Released: August 7, 1992
- Recorded: Excalibur Sound (New York City), Capitol Recording (Hollywood, California), Fantasy Studios (Berkeley, California)
- Length: 56:10
- Label: Warner Bros
- Producer: Angelo Badalamenti; David Lynch

Angelo Badalamenti chronology
Soundtrack from Twin Peaks (1990)	Twin Peaks: Fire Walk With Me (1992)	The City of Lost Children (1995)

Professional ratings
Review scores
Source	Rating
AllMusic	4/5 stars
Pitchfork Media	8.4/10
Q	4/5 stars
Calgary Herald	B+

The soundtrack for the film Twin Peaks: Fire Walk with Me was composed by Angelo Badalamenti and released on August 7, 1992, by Warner Bros. Records.

== Overview ==
The soundtrack includes music by Badalamenti, who had composed and conducted the music on the television series and its original soundtrack. In addition to his instrumental compositions, Fire Walk with Me's soundtrack features vocal accompaniment to Badalamenti's songs by Jimmy Scott and Julee Cruise.

Badalamenti performs vocals on "A Real Indication" and "The Black Dog Runs at Night", two songs by Thought Gang, a musical project between Badalamenti and Lynch. Lynch wrote the lyrics for several of the soundtrack's songs, including "Sycamore Trees", "Questions in a World of Blue", "A Real Indication" and "The Black Dog Runs at Night", and was the soundtrack's producer alongside Badalamenti.

== Track listing ==
All tracks are written by Angelo Badalamenti, except where noted.

Track listing
No.	Title	Lyrics	Music	Length
1.	"Theme from Twin Peaks: Fire Walk with Me"		Angelo Badalamenti	6:40
2.	"The Pine Float"		Badalamenti	3:58
3.	"Sycamore Trees" (vocals by Jimmy Scott)	David Lynch	Badalamenti	3:52
4.	"Don't Do Anything (I Wouldn't Do)"		Badalamenti	7:17
5.	"A Real Indication" (by Thought Gang, vocals by Badalamenti)	Lynch	Badalamenti	5:31
6.	"Questions in a World of Blue" (vocals by Julee Cruise)	Lynch	Badalamenti	4:50
7.	"The Pink Room"		Lynch	4:02
8.	"The Black Dog Runs at Night" (by Thought Gang, vocals by Badalamenti)	Lynch	Badalamenti	1:45
9.	"Best Friends"		Lynch, David Slusser	2:12
10.	"Moving Through Time"		Badalamenti	6:41
11.	"Montage from Twin Peaks: 'Girl Talk'/'Birds in Hell'/'Laura Palmer's Theme'/'Falling'"		Badalamenti	5:27
12.	"The Voice of Love"		Badalamenti	3:55
Total length:				56:10

== Personnel ==
Credits adapted from the liner notes of Twin Peaks: Fire Walk With Me.

=== Performance ===
- Andy Armer – keyboard (track 7)
- Angelo Badalamenti – keyboard (tracks 1, 2, 3, 6, 10, 11, 12); vocals, piano, synthesizer (track 5, 8)
- Donald Bailey – drums (track 9)
- Vinnie Bell – electric guitar (tracks 1, 2, 3, 4, 5, 6, 10, 11); bass guitar (tracks 1, 2, 3, 6); acoustic guitar (tracks 4, 5, 10, 11)
- Myles Boisen – guitar (track 9)
- Ron Carter – acoustic bass (track 3)
- David Cooper – vibraphone (track 9)
- Julee Cruise – vocals (track 6)
- Alvin Blythe Jr. – saxophone (track 3)
- William Fairbanks – bass guitar (track 9)
- Don Falzone – acoustic bass (track 7)
- Steven Hodges – drums (track 7)
- Jay Hoggard – vibraphone (tracks 4, 10)
- Jim Hynes – trumpet (track 1)
- David Jaurequi – guitar (track 7)
- Brian Kirk – drums (track 3)
- Kinny Landrum – keyboard (tracks 1, 2, 3, 6, 11, 12)
- David Lynch – percussion (tracks 5, 8)
- Bill Mays – piano (track 4); keyboards (track 10)
- Rufus Reid – acoustic bass (tracks 4, 10)
- Albert Regni – tenor saxophone (tracks 2, 6)
- Bob Rose – electric guitar, acoustic guitar (track 11)
- Jimmy Scott – vocals (track 3)
- David Slusser – keyboard (track 9)
- Ken-Ichi Shimazu – piano (track 3)
- Grady Tate – drums (tracks 1, 2, 4, 5, 6, 10, 11)
- Buster Williams – acoustic bass (tracks 1, 2, 5, 6, 11)

=== Technical ===
- Angelo Badalamenti – production (all tracks); arrangement, orchestration (tracks 1, 2, 3, 4, 5, 6, 8, 10, 11, 12)
- David Bianco – recording (track 7)
- Ted Jensen – mastering (all tracks)
- David Lynch – production (all tracks); arrangement, orchestration (tracks 5, 7, 8, 9)
- Art Pohlemus – recording (tracks 1, 2, 3, 4, 5, 6, 8, 10, 11, 12)
- Tom Reaction – art direction, design
- Michael Semanick – recording (track 9)
- David Slusser – arrangement, orchestration (track 9)

== Charts ==
Chart performance for Twin Peaks: Fire Walk with Me (soundtrack)
Chart (2025)	Peak position
Croatian International Albums (HDU)	22

== Reception and legacy ==
In her book about the soundtrack of the series and film, Clare Nina Norelli noted that pieces are "informed by jazz" and generally "set up a different atmosphere from that of the series".

In Music in Twin Peaks: Listen to the Sounds, the soundtrack was said to "[reinforce] physical and mental transformations and changes in characters".

Upon its release, Fire Walk with Me's soundtrack charted in the United States, peaking at number 173 on the Billboard 200. It was nominated for, and later received, the Best Music at the 1992 Saturn Awards and Best Original Score at the Independent Spirit Awards.
