= Splatter Trio =

American experimental music and free jazz group

- Also known as: Splatter 3
- Origin: Oakland, California, US
- Genres: Experimental music; Free jazz
- Years active: 1987–1995
- Label: Rastascan Records
- Past members: Dave Barrett; Myles Boisen; Gino Robair

Splatter Trio was a San Francisco Bay Area-based experimental music and free jazz group featuring Dave Barrett on saxophone, Myles Boisen on guitar and bass, and Gino Robair on drums. They formed in 1987 and released five albums before splitting up in 1995. Splatter Trio's music was rooted in jazz, but they often explored several other genres.

== Biography ==
Splatter Trio were formed in 1987 in the San Francisco Bay Area by Dave Barrett with Myles Boisen and Gino Robair after Barrett watched Boisen and Robair performing John Zorn's game piece, Cobra with the Rova Saxophone Quartet. Barrett played saxophone, Robair, drums, and Boisen a custom-built double-neck guitar and bass. Drawing on the experience gained from working with musicians and groups like Anthony Braxton, Fred Frith and the Rova Saxophone Quartet, Splatter Trio developed their own brand of musical improvisation and experimentation. Robair said that rather than confining themselves to musical structure, they played with it, like "sonic playdough". Boisen added, "We don't get lost, but we also don't know where we're going." Mark Corroto stated in All About Jazz that Splatter Trio was seen as "the West Coast version of John Zorn's various New York Downtown bands", but far less serious musically.

Boisen said Splatter Trio used the word "Splatter" in their name because that was the kind of music they intended playing: "Painterly, but also kind of bloody... half-Pollock and half-Peckinpah." Guitar Player music critic Mark Dery described Boisen's guitar/bass playing in Splatter Trio as "splatter jazz", which he defined as "a musical genre that invites comparison to both action painting and moviemaker Sam Peckinpah's abstract expressionist tableaux of bullet-pecked bodies and flying gobbets of blood." Boston Globe music critic Bob Blumenthal also used the term "splatter-jazz" when he reviewed the trio's self-titled debut album. Blumenthal called the album "diverse, terse and pungent", and a "most unexpected treat".

Reviewing a Splatter Trio concert at the DNA Lounge in San Francisco in 1993, Tim Kenneally wrote in BAM magazine that while "[p]hilosophically ... they seem to be firmly rooted in the jazz tradition of improvisation", they do not play jazz in the traditional sense. Kenneally stated that their music often drifts into the "musical netherworld" with "strong tendencies toward garage-band caterwauling and King Crimsonesque space artiness". In a review in DownBeat of another Splatter Trio concert at the HotHouse jazz club in Chicago in October 1993, John Corbett said that the trio's performance was largely led by Robair, who laid down rhythms for Boisen and Barrett to build on. Their set varied from free jazz to garage rock to extracts from "Tomorrow Never Knows", and ended with "a sneaky tango". Corbett noted that unlike their records where they were constantly "surprising each other", this live performance had "an air of complacency" about it. He added that part of the problem may have been Boisen's double-neck guitar: just when the saxophone, bass and drums are connecting, "the bass would often drop out, foiling expectations and fouling the sound".

Splatter Trio released their self-titled debut album in 1990, and went on to record four more albums. They split up in 1997 when they made their final appearance at the Hotel Utah in San Francisco. During this final performance they also incorporated pre-recorded solo CDs made by each of the members which were played randomly during the show, thus creating a "virtual double-trio". A reunion concert occurred in 1998, which was followed by the release of Splatterarities Vol. 1, a compilation album of material from Splatter Trio's career.

== Discography ==
- Splatter Trio (1990, CD, Rastascan Records)
- Fistful of Dewey (1992, CD, Racer Records)
- Anagrams (1992, CD, Rastascan Records)
- Jump or Die (with Debris) (1994, CD, Music & Arts)
- Hi-Fi Junk Note (1995, CD, Rastascan Records)
- Splatterarities Vol. 1 (1998, CDr, Limited Sedition)
- Clear the Club (2007, CD, Rastascan Records)
- It's a Stool Pigeon Universe (with Steve Benson) (2021, CD, Rastascan Records)

== Members ==
- Dave Barrett – saxophone, ocarina, DX-7
- Myles Boisen – custom-built double-neck guitar and bass, Casio
- Gino Robair – drums, sampler, theremin
