= Circles in a Square Society =

Studio album by Boi Akih
- Released: 2012
- Genre: World, jazz, rock
- Length: 53:05
- Label: BROMO

Boi Akih chronology
Yalelol (2007)	Circles in a Square Society (2012)

Circles in a Square Society is the sixth album by the jazz/world music trio Boi Akih, released in 2012.

After extensive listening sessions with classic rock records and lengthy discussions about songs with a timeless quality, Brouer and Akihary decided to incorporate some of their favorite selections into an album that includes a musical commentary on the era from which the songs came.

== Reception ==
The album was met with a great deal of positive critical reception in Europe and the music was showcased live at Bimhuis, and on World Radio6. Saskia Törnqvist gave the album a 4 star out of 5 rating in the Parool. Dutch Newspaper De Volkskrant published a 5 star rating by Frank van Herk.

== Track listing ==
1. " Circle 5" (N. Brouwer, M. Akihary)
2. " Guinnevere" (D. Crosby)
3. " Cold Blue Steel And Sweet Fire" (J. Mitchell)
4. " Circle 2" (N. Bouwer)
5. " A Merman I Should Turn To Be" (J. Hendrix)
6. " Drifting" (J. Hendrix)
7. " Circle 3" (N. Brouwer, W. Wierbos)
8. " Old Man"
9. " Circle Exercise" (N. Brouwer)
10. " Circle 4" (N. Brouwer)
11. " Redemption Song" (B. Marley)

== Personnel ==
- Monica Akihary – vocals
- Niels Brouwer – guitar, computer, no-input mixer, world band receiver
- Wolter Wierbos – trombone
- Kim Weemhoff – drums
