= Jean Derome =

Canadian musician and composer

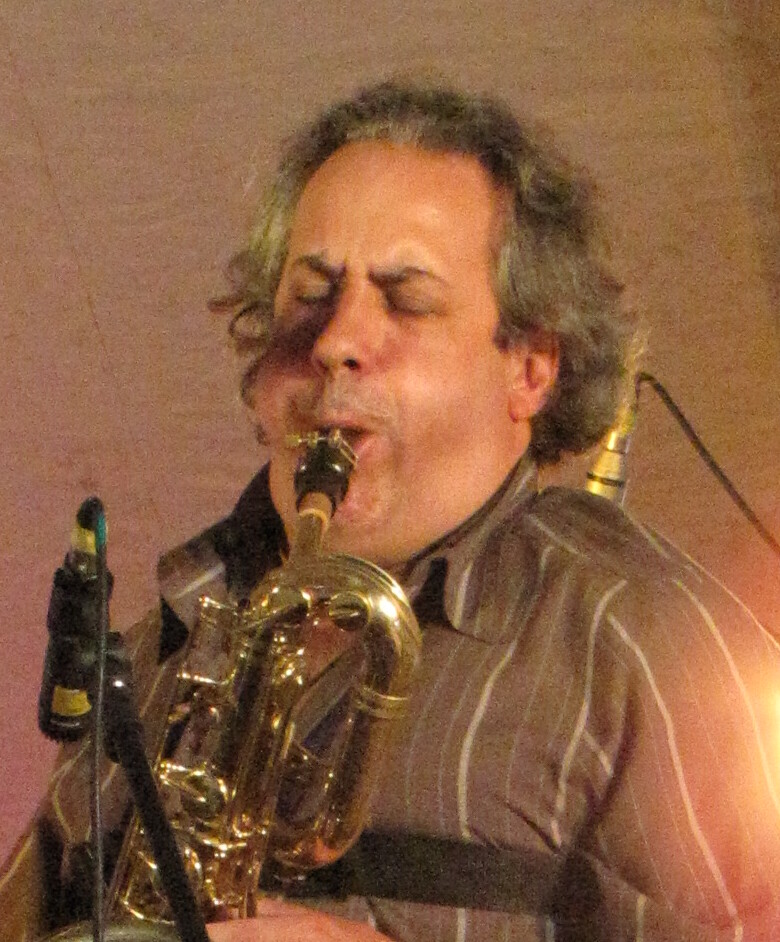
- Derome performing at the Guelph Jazz Festival in 2009

Background information
- Born: Jean Derome; June 29, 1955 (age 71); Montreal, Quebec, Canada
- Genres: Avant-garde jazz, avant-rock, experimental, free improvisation, contemporary classical
- Occupations: Musician, Composer
- Instruments: Saxophone, flute
- Years active: 1973–present
- Label: Ambiances Magnétiques
- Website: www.jeanderome.com

Jean Derome (born June 29, 1955) is a French Canadian avant-garde saxophonist, flautist, and composer. A prominent figure in the Montreal musique actuelle (new music) scene, Derome has been a member of experimental, jazz, and rock groups, and has appeared on over 30 albums, including seven solo albums. He has written scores for over 30 films and co-founded Ambiances Magnétiques, a Canadian musical collective and independent record label.

In 1992, Derome won the second annual Canadian Freddie Stone Award.

== Biography ==
Jean Derome was born in Montreal, Quebec on 29 June 1955. He studied music theory in Montreal at Cégep de Saint-Laurent between 1972 and 1975, and flute at Conservatoire de Musique du Quebec between 1975 and 1979. He also taught music theory and flute in Montreal colleges between 1974 and 1983. During his studies, he formed his first band Nébu in 1973, one of Quebec’s first avant-garde jazz groups. A trio with Derome on flute, pianist Pierre St-Jacques and bassist Claude Simard, Nébu played "classically-informed contemporary jazz". They toured extensively in Quebec, performed at the Festival de Musique Ouverte de Châteauvallon in France in 1977 and at the inaugural Montreal International Jazz Festival in 1980. Nébu made two albums, Nébu (1978) and Motus (1980) before disbanding in 1981.

In 1978 Derome, St-Jacques and others founded EMIM (Ensemble de Musique Improvisée de Montréal), an informal association of free-improvising and jazz musicians. EMIM produced a number of groups, many with Derome as composer, arranger and flutist. In 1983 Derome began playing alto saxophone with La Grande Aventure, a street band popular at the Montreal International Jazz Festival, and later with two groups devoted to the music of Thelonious Monk, Mystérioso and Évidence.

In 1983 Derome and Québec guitarist René Lussier formed Ambiances Magnétiques, a musical collective and independent record label, providing an outlet for the avant-garde music of its members. One of the first groups from this collective was Les Granules. It was formed by Derome and Lussier in 1984, and combined traditional songs, free improvisation, musical parody and social commentary. Derome and Lussier also performed at jazz festivals across North America and Europe between 1988 and 1991. In 1989, Derome and Lussier joined Fred Frith's review band Keep the Dog, which toured Europe, North America and the former Soviet Union until the band's demise in 1991.

Derome has collaborated with a number of other musicians, including Chris Cutler, Pierre Tanguay, Myles Boisen, Louis Sclavis and Jandek. In 1988, Derome released his first solo album, Confitures de Gagaku, followed by six more over the next 14 years. Derome has composed scores for over 30 films, working with a number of Quebec film directors, including Michèle Cournoyer, Jacques Leduc, Pierre Hébert and Jean Detheux. He also wrote and choreographed a number of dance and theatre pieces in the early to mid-1980s, including Confitures de Gagaku (1985) for woodwinds, soprano, double bass, keyboards and percussion.

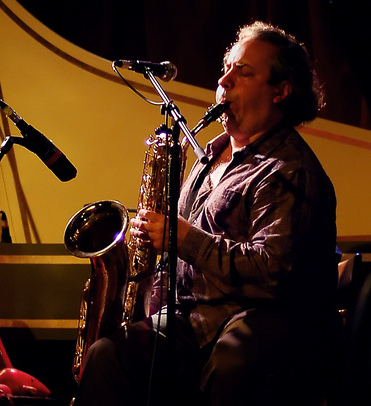
Jean Derome performing at the Suoni Per Il Popolo Festival in Montreal in 2007

Derome is a member of Nicolas Caloia's Ratchet Orchestra, which ranges in size from 15 to 30 musicians and has performed the music of Caloia, Sun Ra, and Malcolm Goldstein.

In celebration of his 60th birthday, Derome is undertaking an extensive schedule of performances and special events which is being called 'L'année Jean Derome' ('The year of Jean Derome). The inaugural event was his performance of 'Resistances' for 20-piece orchestra, presented at the 2015 edition of the Festival International de Musique Actuelle de Victoriaville (FIMAV).

Derome is "[one] of the most active and eclectic musicians on the Canadian creative music scene." His unique writing style and his compositions have earned him recognition not only in Canada, but across the world.

== Discography ==
=== Bands ===
Conventum

- À l’affût d’un Complot (1977, LP, Disques Tamandir)
- Le Bureau Central des Utopies (1979, LP, Disques Cadence)

Nébu

- Nébu (1978, LP, Disques Cadence)
- Motus (1980, LP, Disques Cadence)

Les Granules

- Soyez Vigilants, Restez Vivants… (1986, LP, Ambiances Magnétiques)
- Le Retour des Granules (1988, LP, Ambiances Magnétiques)
- Au Royaume du Silencieux (1992, CD, Ambiances Magnétiques)

Évidence

- Musique de Thelonious Monk (1993, CD, Ambiances Jazz)
- Live à la Casa (2000, CD, Ambiances Jazz)

Jean Derome et les Dangereux Zhoms

- Carnets de Voyage (1995, CD, Ambiances Magnétiques)
- Navré (1996, CD, Ambiances Magnétiques)
- Torticolis (1998, CD, Ambiances Magnétiques)
- 1994–96 (1998, 3xCD, Ambiances Magnétiques)

Nous Perçons les Oreilles

- Nous Perçons les Oreilles (1998, CD, Ambiances Magnétiques)
- La Vie, c’est Simple (2002, CD, Ambiances Magnétiques)

Keep the Dog

- That House We Lived In (2003, 2xCD, Fred Records)

Fanfare Pourpour

- Le Bal (2004, CD, Monsieur Fauteux)

Trio Derome Guilbeault Tanguay

- The Feeling of Jazz (2005, CD, Ambiances Jazz)
- 10 Compositions (2004, CD, Ambiances Jazz)

=== Collaborations ===
With Chris Cutler and René Lussier

- Three Suite Piece (1996, CD, Recommended Records)

With Pierre Tanguay

- Plinc! Plonc! (2001, CD, Ambiances Magnétiques)

With Myles Boisen, Fred Frith and Pierre Tanguay

- All Is Bright, But It Is Not Day (2002, CD, Ambiances Magnétiques)

With Louis Sclavis

- Un Moment de Bonheur (2003, CD, Victo Records)

With Abel Hassing and Pierre Tanguay

- Résilience (2004, CD, independent)

=== Solo ===
- Confitures de Gagaku (1988, CD, Victo Records)
- Je Me Souviens; Hommage à Georges Perec; Tu r’luttes (1997, CD, Ambiances Magnétiques)
- La Bête / The Beast Within (1997, CD, Ambiances Magnétiques)
- 3 Musiques Pour UBU (1998, 2xCD, Ambiances Magnétiques)
- Strand, Under the Dark Cloth (1999, CD, Ambiances Magnétiques)
- Le Magasin de Tissu (2001, CD, Ambiances Magnétiques)
- Canot-Camping, Expédition 4 (2002, CD, Ambiances Magnétiques)
