= Cafe Du Nord =

Music venue in San Francisco, California, U.S.

Cafe Du Nord and the Swedish American Hall
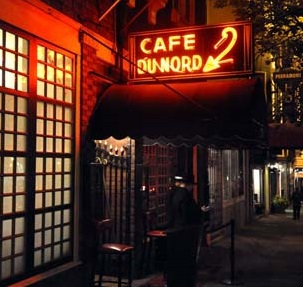
- Interactive map of Cafe Du Nord and the Swedish American Hall
- Address: 2170 Market Street
- Location: San Francisco, California, U.S.
- Coordinates: 37°46′0.1″N 122°25′49.4″W
- Type: Nightclub, Bar, Restaurant, Private Event Space

Construction
- Built: 1906
- Opened: 2017, under current ownership

Website
- www.cafedunord.com

Cafe Du Nord is a 320-person capacity music venue in the basement level of the historic Swedish American Hall in the Upper Market neighborhood of San Francisco, California, U.S.

== History ==
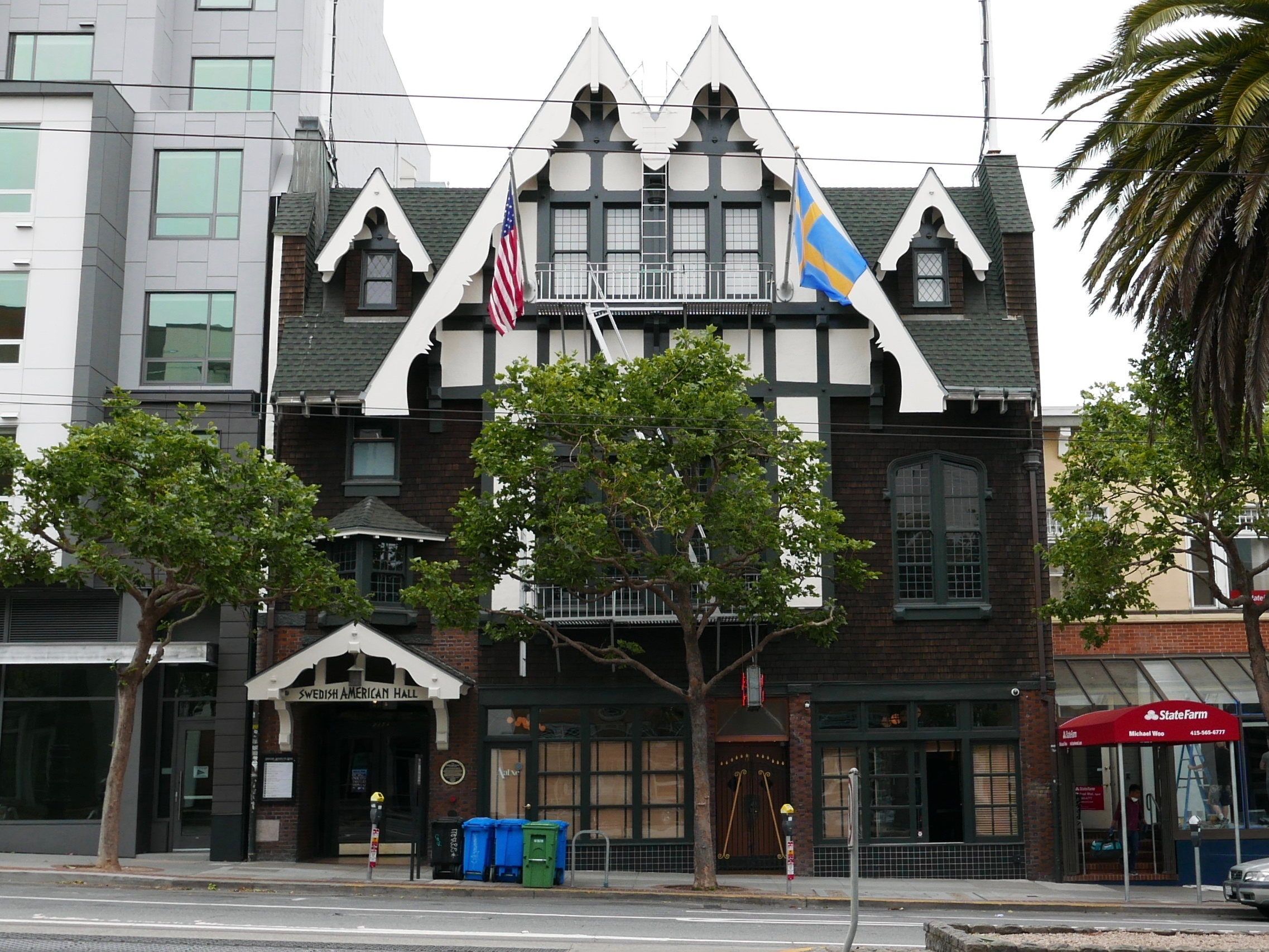
The Swedish American Hall

Both Cafe Du Nord and The Swedish American Hall have hosted internationally known musicians, up and coming bands, and local artists nearly every night of the week. The venues are known for hosting many now famous bands when they were first starting out. Notable shows include Arthur Lee and Love’s last show, Neil Young, The Zombies, Dave Davies (the Kinks), John Cale, J. Mascis, Frank Black, Blink 182, St. Vincent, The Decemberists, Spoon, Iron and Wine, Rilo Kiley, Vincent Gallo, Mumford and Sons, Train, Cake, Sara Bareilles, Andrew W.K., Brian Jonestown Massacre, Girls, Tash Sultana, Alkaline Trio, Lola Young, Mt. Joy, Delta Spirit, and The Lumineers.

Similar local and intimate live music venues in San Francisco include the Bottom of the Hill, Public Works SF, The Independent, the Brick and Mortar Music Hall, Hotel Utah, the Knockout SF, Tempest Bar, and the Chapel SF.

== Awards ==
The venue's setting and reputation for hosting live shows have earned Cafe Du Nord and the Swedish American Hall numerous awards over the years including: a 2013 "Nightey" Award for Best Live Music Venue in San Francisco (under 400 capacity) the California Music and Culture Association's "Best Music Venue" 2012, Top 40 Music Venues in America, Paste Magazine, and one of California's "Top Ten Most Beautiful Music Venues," CA Home and Design.
