= Three Suite Piece =

Studio album by René Lussier, Chris Cutler and Jean Derome
- Released: 1996
- Genre: Experimental music
- Length: 52:32
- Label: Recommended
- Producer: René Lussier, Chris Cutler and Jean Derome

Three Suite Piece is an album of music released by René Lussier, Chris Cutler and Jean Derome. The album was released on Cutler's Recommended Records label in 1996.

As per its title, the Three Suite Piece contains three extended compositions from Lussier, Derome and Cutler. The first track, "La suite des trois pommes", is taken from the film score of a 1987 production by Jacques Leduc. The core music is baroque in nature, owes a strong influence to Johann Sebastian Bach; the performance is more solidly grounded in avant-garde rock. "The Cold Storage Suite" is a more experimental modern work, while "The Don't Worry Suite" is an extended fusion-esque number.

== Track listing ==
1. La Suite Des Trois Pommes
  1. "Le Lac Gaia" (Lussier) – 0:28
  2. "Menuet #2 (Folk Version)" (Lussier) – 2:10
  3. "La Police" (Lussier) – 1:28
  4. "Prelude Du #4" (Cora) – 3:25
  5. "Menuet #2 (Motown Version)" (Lussier) – 1:31
  6. "La Minute Du Patron" (Lussier/Derome/Cutler/Cora) – 0:59
  7. "Interventions" (Lussier/Derome/Cutler/Cora) – 3:48
  8. "International Cruise (Menuet #1)" (Lussier/Derome) – 2:33
2. The Don't Worry Suite
  1. "Don't Worry" (Lussier/Derome/Cutler) – 9:23
3. The Cold Storage Suite
  1. "Scars And Stars" (Derome) – 3:36
  2. "Avion/Prison" (Lussier) – 2:03
  3. "Bit Late" (Lussier/Derome/Cutler) – 0:22
  4. "L'Industrie De Lat Priere" (Lussier/Derome/Cutler) – 4:40
  5. "Dans Le Dalot" (Lussier/Derome/Cutler) – 1:20
  6. "Cars And Stars" (Derome) – 2:28
  7. "3 Dans 1" (Lussier/Derome/Cutler) – 3:44
  8. "Boos, Booze, Bouse" (Lussier/Derome/Cutler) – 1:49
  9. "Fondre, Fou, Faible, Triste" (Derome) – 3:12
  10. "Red Eye" (Derome) – 2:52
  11. "Bars And Stars" (Lussier/Derome/Cutler) – 0:41
4. "Zilch" (Programming Insert) (Lussier/Derome/Cutler)

== Personnel ==
- René Lussier – guitar, bass guitar, percussion, whistling, cassettes
- Jean Derome – saxophone, flute, vocals, keyboards, game calls, electronics
- Chris Cutler – drums, percussion, electronics
- Tom Cora – bass guitar on "La suite des trois pommes"
