= Bay Area Improv Scene =

The Bay Area Improv Scene is a commonly used name for a loose association of musicians and composers centered in the San Francisco Bay Area who create a style of music that evolved largely from avant-garde jazz and modern classical music, with influences from other areas such as electronic art music, free improvisation, and musique concrète. Other names of this scene tend to use phrases such as "Creative Music" to try to incorporate a wider focus than just the improvisational approach.

This scene is comparable to the New York Downtown Scene (which is most often associated with John Zorn) and historically both scenes date back to the same time period in the early 1960s. A listing of some people who have been associated with the scene can provide a sense of the range of the music: List of Bay Area Improv Scene bands and artists

== Nature of the music ==
While most practitioners of this music are consciously avoiding the restrictions of any one particular genre, some generalizations can be made:

This is a very instrumental music, showing its primary influences from the jazz and modern classical worlds: the most common instruments are horns, woodwinds, and strings. Guitars and percussion are also often used, though not usually in the rock n' roll style, and the use of electronics is very common. Vocals are somewhat rare, and recognizable lyrics are still rarer.

Many of the practitioners are formally trained musicians, capable of playing conventional music with relative ease. If they choose to play rougher, noisier sounds, it is almost always a matter of choice, not necessity.

Central to the scene's conception of itself is the freedom to break rules: it does not shun the conventional virtues such as melody and rhythm, but it also accepts the atonal and the arrhythmic.

This is a relatively unpredictable music, it varies tremendously from moment to moment, and from performance to performance. It is not reliably loud or soft, energetic or contemplative. If it "gets into a groove" it does not often stay there.

This is a music that often (though not always) has a very intellectual quality which can run contrary to the usual presumption that music is primarily about the expression of emotion.

== Character of the Bay Area scene ==
This is not often a popular music, and it survives with very little in the way of commercial support. Performance spaces are organized and run by a spirit of volunteerism, with occasional arts grants. The musicians often support themselves by "day jobs" (though sometimes these "day jobs" consist of performing other types of music). The lack of commercial opportunities is sometimes seen as a positive feature of the scene:

As Gino Robair puts it in an interview with "The Wire":

Overall, the Bay Area scene seems to encourage people to cross over the boundaries of musical styles and collaborate. Part of the reason, I believe, is that there is very little "careerism" here: because there are so few sustainable well- paying gigs, people aren't so concerned with having to keep some kind of performance style "pure" by not mingling with other kinds of music. And the talent pool is massive, despite there being no real music industry, compared to, say, New York City or LA. Musicians who settle here are in it for the right reasons: to explore sound, even if it takes them into unknown territory. Cage, Partch, Lou Harrison, Henry Cowell, Steve Reich, Pauline Oliveros, Terry Riley ... all spent formative years here doing unique and highly creative work.

Vijay Iyer concurs with Gino Robair's assessment: "'The Bay Area was a really nurturing environment, where I gained my creative footing and figured out what I wanted to do as an artist,' Iyers explains. 'It was nice to have the time and space to stretch out among creative people without really having the pressure of New York, where you can't really screw around.'".

Tim Perkis, in an interview with Derk Richardson about the "Noisy People" documentary also agrees:

"It really is a social unit," Perkis said of the improv scene. "At one point in the film, Gino [Robair] talks about it being like a family. It really is a cohesive scene, and it's almost like being in one large band over the course of years. And when other improvisers come into town from elsewhere to play, it's often revealed how there is sort of a shared Bay Area aesthetic and idiom -- a different dialect than what people coming in might be doing.

Derk Richardson regards the history of the scene as composed of two intertwining threads: an irascible individuality, tempered by periods of pulling together into collective efforts.

== Name of the scene ==
The name "Bay Area Improv Scene" is frequently contentious because while many of the performances on the scene embrace improvisational techniques, no one is opposed to composition, and many of the people associated with the scene favor it. There are also some logical problems with it as a classification, because there are other musical scenes that use improvisation (e.g. freestyle hip-hop) which aren't usually included in the "improv scene". Also, the term "Improv" has been increasingly associated with a form of comedy theater that's completely unrelated to this style of music.

Many attempts have been made to invent a more general term, such as "New Music " or "Creative Music" but these have the converse problem of being too non-specific, and no alternative name has achieved common use.

Notably, the New York analog of the scene simply uses a geographical reference ("Downtown") as a label. One suggestion is that it might be best to adopt the name of the long-running events calendar, and simply call it "The Transbay Scene".

== Venues ==
Despite the phrase "Bay Area" in the name, the scene doesn't really span the entire Bay Area region: the performance venues have largely only been located in either San Francisco or in the East Bay. Very few performances take place in the South Bay or North Bay regions, though there are occasional related events in locations such as Santa Cruz, Big Sur, or Sacramento.

Many performances have taken place in small one-off venues, or as part of relatively short-lived weekly series, but at any point in time, there are typically a few larger, longer-lived performance venues that define the character of the scene, for example Beanbenders, Luggage Store Gallery or 21 Grand. In addition, there are annual festivals that happen at special venues (or sometimes, among multiple scattered venues).

The locations of performances are usually promoted in the on-line bayimproviser.com listing, as well as through occasional write-ups in the popular press.

== History ==
One might trace the beginnings of the scene back to the formation of the San Francisco Tape Music Center founded in 1962 (Tape Music was one of the original names for what we now think of as Electronic Music). Pauline Oliveros, later a member of the San Francisco Tape Music Center, began playing free improvisations with Terry Riley and Loren Rush in 1958. Some of these sessions were recorded at KPFA.

The Tape Music Center ultimately merged with the Mills Center for Contemporary Music, and the Mills College graduate program remains one of the common points of reference for members of the scene.

The Rova Saxophone Quartet (formed in the late 70s) is an early, well-known group, featuring a more avant-jazz approach. At the same time, Henry Kaiser and Greg Goodman gained prominence with their European-inspired improvisational musics. Each founded record labels, Metalanguage Records (Kaiser, with Larry Ochs) and The Beak Doctor (Goodman), and organized concerts featuring performers such as Derek Bailey, Evan Parker, Charles K. Noyes, and Toshinori Kondo. Also active from the 1970s on were Henry Kuntz, John Gruntfest, and Ron Heglin.

In the late-80s there was an "improvcore scene" centering on "Olive Oil's", located on the waterfront in what was then an industrial neighborhood of San Francisco. This featured performers such as the Splatter Trio, the Rova Saxophone Quartet and the Molecules. .

In the early 90s, Radio Valencia in San Francisco's Mission district began its well-regarded Sunday night jazz series, curated by Don Alan, one of the proprietors of the cafe. The founding of Amoeba Records by scene stalwart Marc Weinstein provided a significant boost to local artists, and its racks bristling with avant-garde musics of all kinds became a magnet for drawing musicians from all over the world.

1991 saw the founding of the Improvised Music Association which organized concerts, put out a compilation cassette of music, and published a newsletter eventually named FREEWAY. Active members included Dan Plonsey, Mantra, Randy Porter, Myles Boisen, and Tom Djll. The Berkeley Store Gallery hosted numerous IMA-associated concerts, a series that circuitously led to the Beanbenders series.

In the mid-90s, the Beanbenders venue emerged in Berkeley, which for a few years was the center of the scene in the East Bay. It is most often associated with Dan Plonsey, the most prominent member of a collective including other members such as Bill Hsu. Another characteristic venue of the mid-90s was "The Dark Circle Lounge" weekly series, run by Gino Robair at the Hotel Utah.

The Luggage Store Gallery hosts the longest running weekly series in the area, having been founded in the mid-1990s. Originally it was largely directed by Damon Smith, though currently it is curated by Rent Romus and Matt Davignon, who are also active with the 509 Cultural Gallery.

Another long-lived weekly series is also located in a San Francisco art gallery: The Meridian Gallery, in the Union Square area. This series was founded by Philip Gelb.

A leading venue in the east bay has been 21 Grand in Uptown Oakland. 21 Grand was awarded Best Multidisciplinary Art Gallery: Broadest definition of taste by The East Bay Express in 2007:

Even in the ultracosmopolitan East Bay, it's difficult to find venues that are willing to book the kind of wacky, experimental-music shows that wouldn't go over in a place like the Stork Club — shows in which you'd expect to see Tom Djll blowing into the wrong end of a trumpet, Phillip Greenlief bobbling a triplet figure over and over, or the Moe!kestra! reading from a graphically notated score. It's even harder to find venues with a desire to make such music accessible for all ages. Enter 21 Grand, a beloved gallery and performance space that showcases some of the best avant-garde poets, authors, playwrights, experimental filmmakers, photographers, conceptual artists, and musicians from local and national underground scenes.

Some of the more significant Bay Area ensembles that have come and sometimes gone in this time period include the Rova Saxophone Quartet, Splatter Trio, Negativland, MX-80, New Klezmer Trio, Eskimo, The Molecules, Pluto, Rotodoti, Daniel Popsicle, Jettison Slinky, Caroliner Rainbow, Vacuum Tree Head, The Manufacturing of Humidifiers, Natto Quartet, Room, Adam Lane's Full Throttle Orchestra, Rubber City, Zen Widow, Trance Mission, Opeye, Glenn Spearman's groups, the Clubfoot Orchestra, The Hub, TJ Kirk, Blectum From Blechdom, Pinkmountain, Grosse Abfahrt, Graham Connah's various groups, The Lost Trio, Spezza Rotto, Moe!kestra, What We Live, Positive Knowledge, sfSound, Oakland Active Orchestra, Brassiosaurus, Good For Cows and Ghost In The House.

== Labels ==
While artists on the scene often record on small, individual labels (and some occasionally have releases on larger labels, or ones centered in a different location, such as Tzadik), Nottwo, Kadima, Innova, New World, Black Saint, Victo. Nuscope, FMP, Etc. There are a number of locally based independent labels that have traditionally featured recordings from the scene:

- Edgetone Records
- Evander Music
- Limited Sedition
- Rastascan Records
- Balance Point Acoustics
