= Institute of Indonesian Arts and Culture, Bandung =

Indonesian educational institution

Coordinates: 6.879815°S 107.625939°E

Bandung Institute of Indonesian Arts and Culture
- Institut Seni Budaya Indonesia Bandung
- Type: State university
- Established: 1968
- Rector: Dr. Hj. Een Herdiani, S.Sen., M.Hum
- Location: Jalan Buah Batu No. 212 (Indonesia) , Bandung, West Java, Indonesia
- Nickname: ISBI Bandung
- Website: www.isbi.ac.id

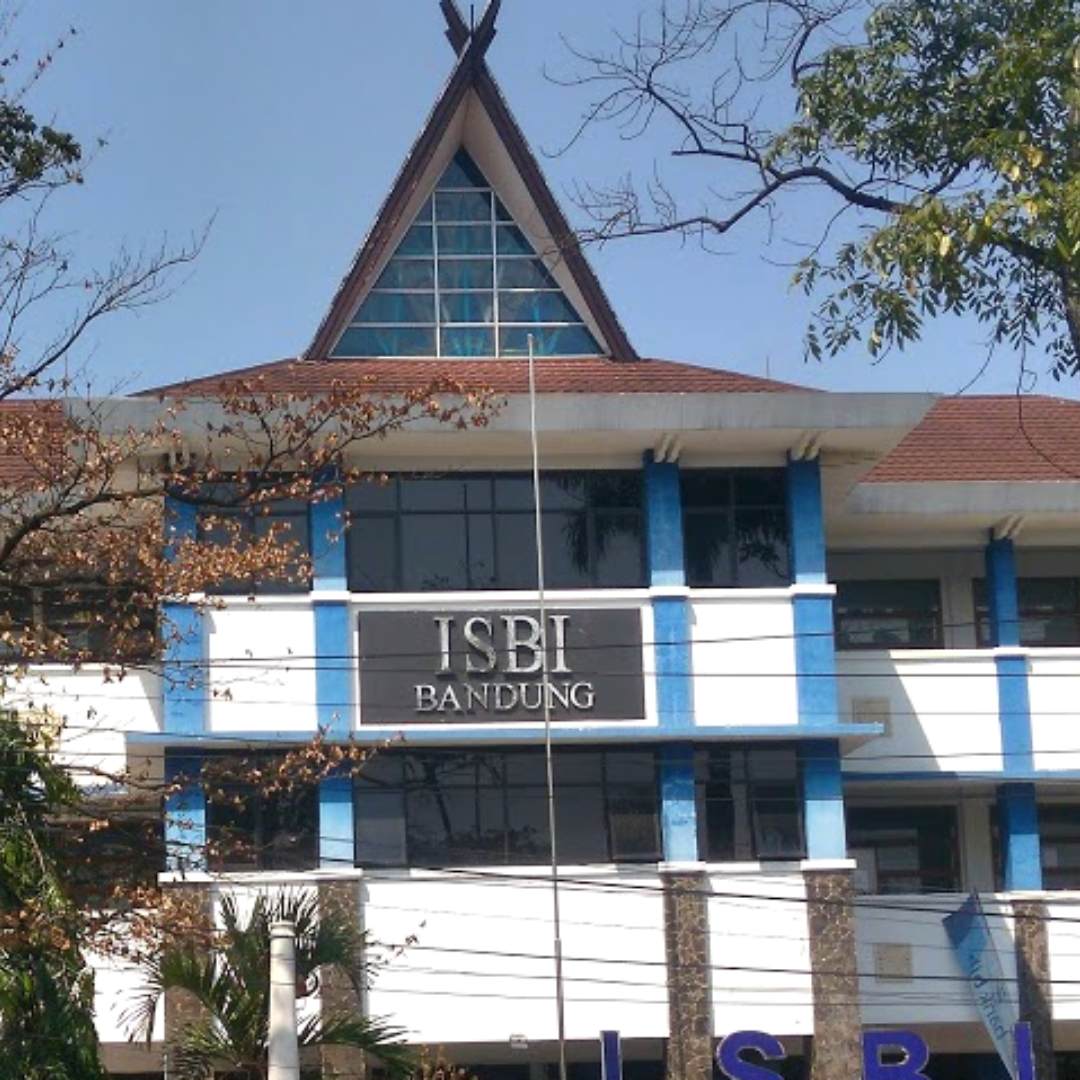
ISBI

Bandung Institute of Indonesian Arts and Culture (Indonesian: Institut Seni Budaya Indonesia Bandung, abbreviated as ISBI Bandung), is a state-owned, arts and cultural-oriented educational institution located in Bandung, Indonesia.

There are various undergraduate faculties covering the fields of the performing arts, art and design, and culture and media. There are also graduate faculties offering Master of Fine Arts degrees.

== History ==
In the beginning, the Institute of Indonesian Arts and Culture, Bandung, was called Dance Conservatory (Indonesian: Konservatori Tari (KORI)) which was founded in March 1968. However, during this period, the institute was not yet a formal higher education institution. By 1971, an agreement was signed between several government agencies and art education institutes in Bandung, West Java, and Yogyakarta, which led to the Dance Conservatory to function as a branch of the Indonesian Dance Academy of Yogyakarta (Indonesian: Akademi Seni Tari Indonesia (ASTI) Yogyakarta) – which was a precursor to the modern-day Institute of Indonesian Arts and Culture, Yogyakarta – leading to the Dance Conservatory to be renamed Indonesian Dance Academy of Bandung (Indonesian: Akademi Seni Tari Indonesia (ASTI) Bandung).

In 1995, due to a governmental initiative for art higher education development, the Indonesian Dance Academy of Bandung underwent another structural and name change, becoming the Indonesian Art College of Bandung (Sekolah Tinggi Seni Indonesia (STSI) Bandung). Several new programs were added to the school, including karawitan, theater, performing arts, fine arts, beauty and fashion, television and film, as well as angklung study and bamboo music. Finally, in 2014, the art college became the Institute of Indonesian Arts and Culture following a presidential decree by Susilo Bambang Yudhoyono.

== Logo ==
The logo of the institute is dark blue, and is made up of a fishbone cactus flower, bow, bird wings, and rebab (a string instrument).

Each of the faculties has a different flag color with a white-colored version of the institute's logo on the center of the flag.

== Facilities ==
=== Performing arts center ===
The institute has five performing arts center, including two pendopo-style buildings (Pendopo Mundinglaya, Pendopo Mundinglaya 2), two high-rise buildings (Gedung Pertunjukan Sunan Ambu, Gedung Olah Seni Patanjala), and one open theater-style space (Mini Panggun Terbuka Karawitan).
