= Game call =

A game call is a device that is used to mimic animal noises to attract or drive animals to a hunter. Animal species attracted to game calls include deer, turkey, ducks, geese, moose, elk, raccoons, wild pigs, coyotes, bears, wolves, cougars, foxes, quails, squirrels, chipmunks, and crows.
