= Hotel Utah (San Francisco) =

Historic building in San Francisco

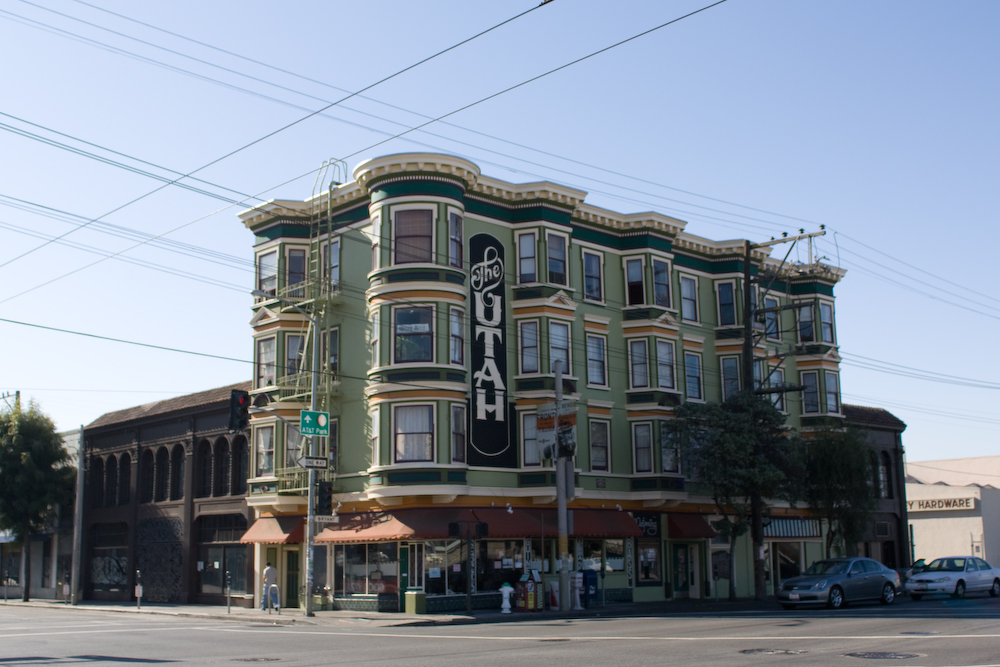

- Location within San Francisco County Location within California Location within the United States
- 37.780010°N 122.397959°W
- Location: 500–504 4th Street, San Francisco, California, U.S.

History
- Built: 1908; 118 years ago

Site notes
- Architectural style: Edwardian

San Francisco Designated Landmark
- Designated: November 2, 2018
- Reference no.: 282

The Hotel Utah is a historic mixed-use building known as a saloon bar, live music venue, and residential hotel, built in 1908 and located in the South of Market neighborhood of San Francisco, California. It is known for its diverse open mic nights, which have historically attracted some people who have later become famous. It is also known as The Utah Inn, The Hotel Utah Saloon, and simply The Utah.

The Hotel Utah has been listed as a San Francisco Designated Landmark since November 2, 2018.

== Building history ==
The Hotel Utah is located at 500–504 4th Street, at Bryant Street in San Francisco, California. It was built in 1908 as a saloon and hotel. The interior of the saloon is fairly small, which makes for an intimate performance and music venue. The building is four stories and the upper floors were once an inn, and now operates as a single room occupancy and room rental.

The building was originally created for seasonal workers employed in nearby factories. In the 1930s, the saloon was a hangout for gamblers, madams, and longshoremen. Most of the buildings in the nearby neighborhood were razed in the 1940s and 1950s during a period of redevelopment, including almost all of the other residential hotels. After World War II, Al Opatz owned the saloon which he named, "Al's Transbay Tavern". On March 18, 1977, the bar was purchased by Paul Gaer, who turned the space into the Hotel Utah and built the stage. Damian Samuel, who had gotten his start as a doorman (under Gaer), was later the owner of the Hotel Utah.

== Cultural history ==
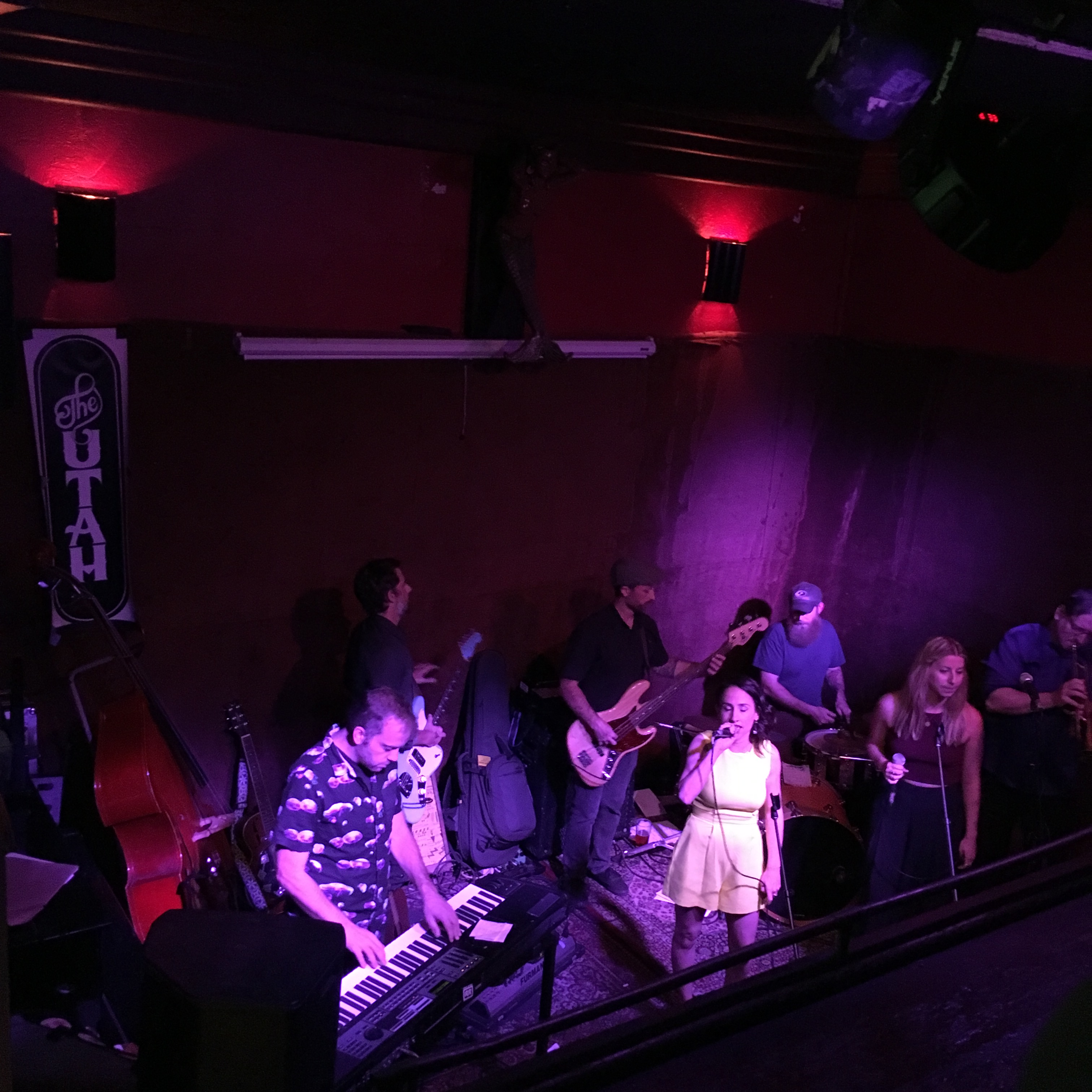
Hotel Utah performance, Keren Bein and band (2016)

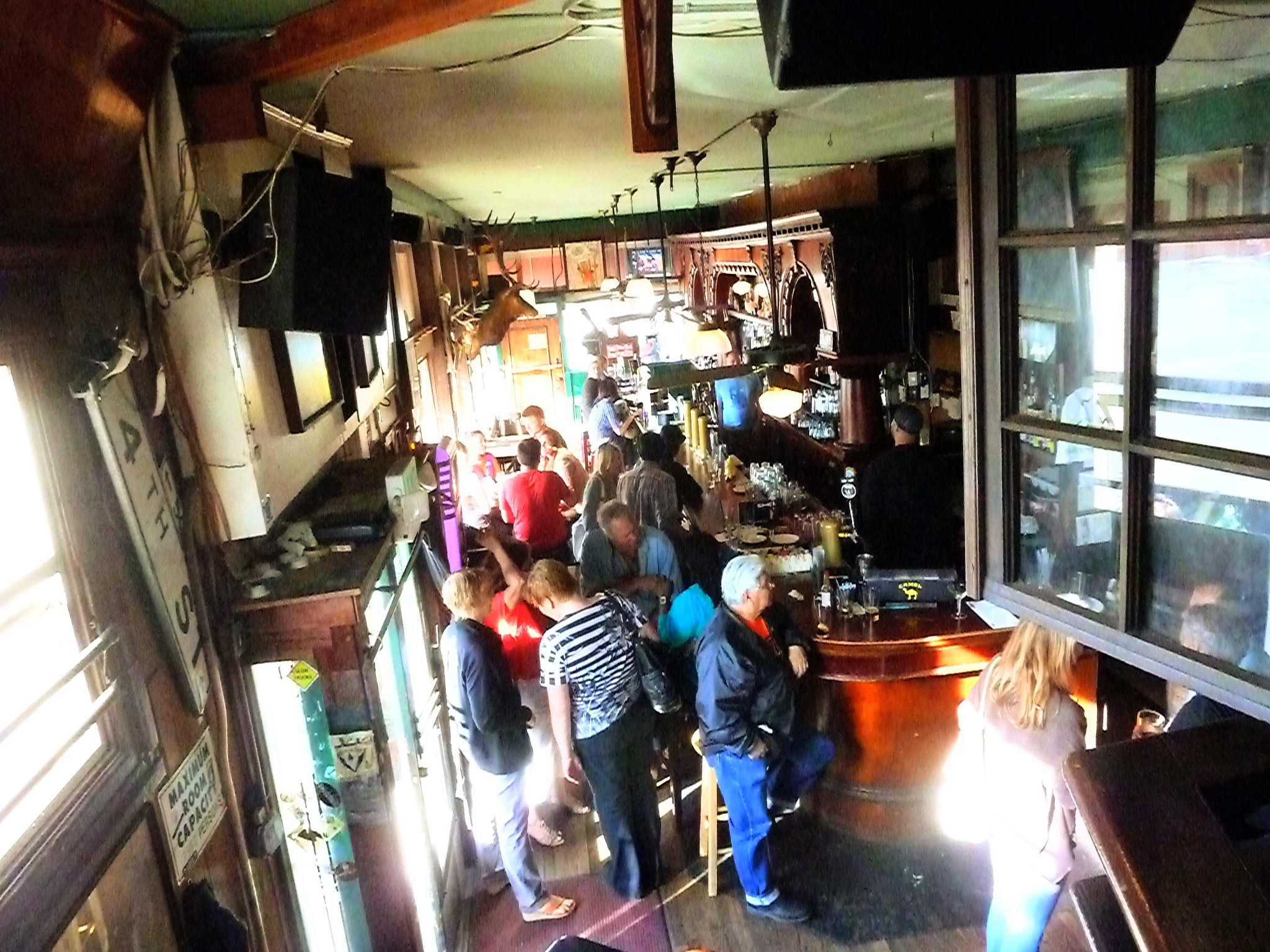
Interior view

The Hotel Utah Open Mic on Mondays draws a local diverse crowd including musicians, comedians, poets, and other performers. Notable people and bands that have performed here include Con Brio, Mike Deni of Geographer, Amina Shareef Ali, Kelly McFarling, PJ Harvey, Matt Nathanson, Miggs, Toychestra, The Union Trade, The Loud Family, Terra Naomi, Whoopi Goldberg, Robin Williams, and John Mayer.

In 1980, the drag musical Blonde Sin was first performed at Hotel Utah, featuring Doris Fish with Sluts A-Go-Go (the drag queens Tippi and Miss X).

In 1989, The Marsh, a theater company was founded at the Hotel Utah, before they found their own space.

From January 4, 1994, to January 14, 1997, "The Dark Circle Lounge" was a weekly improvisational music series, and it later became a festival, founded and led by Gino Robair at the Hotel Utah. The Bay Area Improv Scene participated in The Dark Circle Lounge.

In 1989, the album United Kingdom by American Music Club was partially recorded at Hotel Utah, including the song "All the Lost Souls Welcome You to San Francisco". In 2008, Black Francis recorded the album Live at the Hotel Utah Saloon.

The Hotel Utah is mentioned in an essay in the Rachel Kushner book, The Hard Crowd: Essays 2000–2009 (2021, Simon & Schuster). She reminisces on a secret PJ Harvey concert she saw at the Hotel Utah, which inspired her to become a writer.

Similar local and intimate live music venues in San Francisco include the Bottom of the Hill, Public Works SF, The Independent, Great American Music Hall, the Brick and Mortar Music Hall, Cafe Du Nord, the Knockout SF, and the Chapel SF.

== See also ==
- Historic bars and saloons in San Francisco
