= Indonesian Institute of Arts, Bali =

Indonesian university

- Institut Seni Indonesia Bali
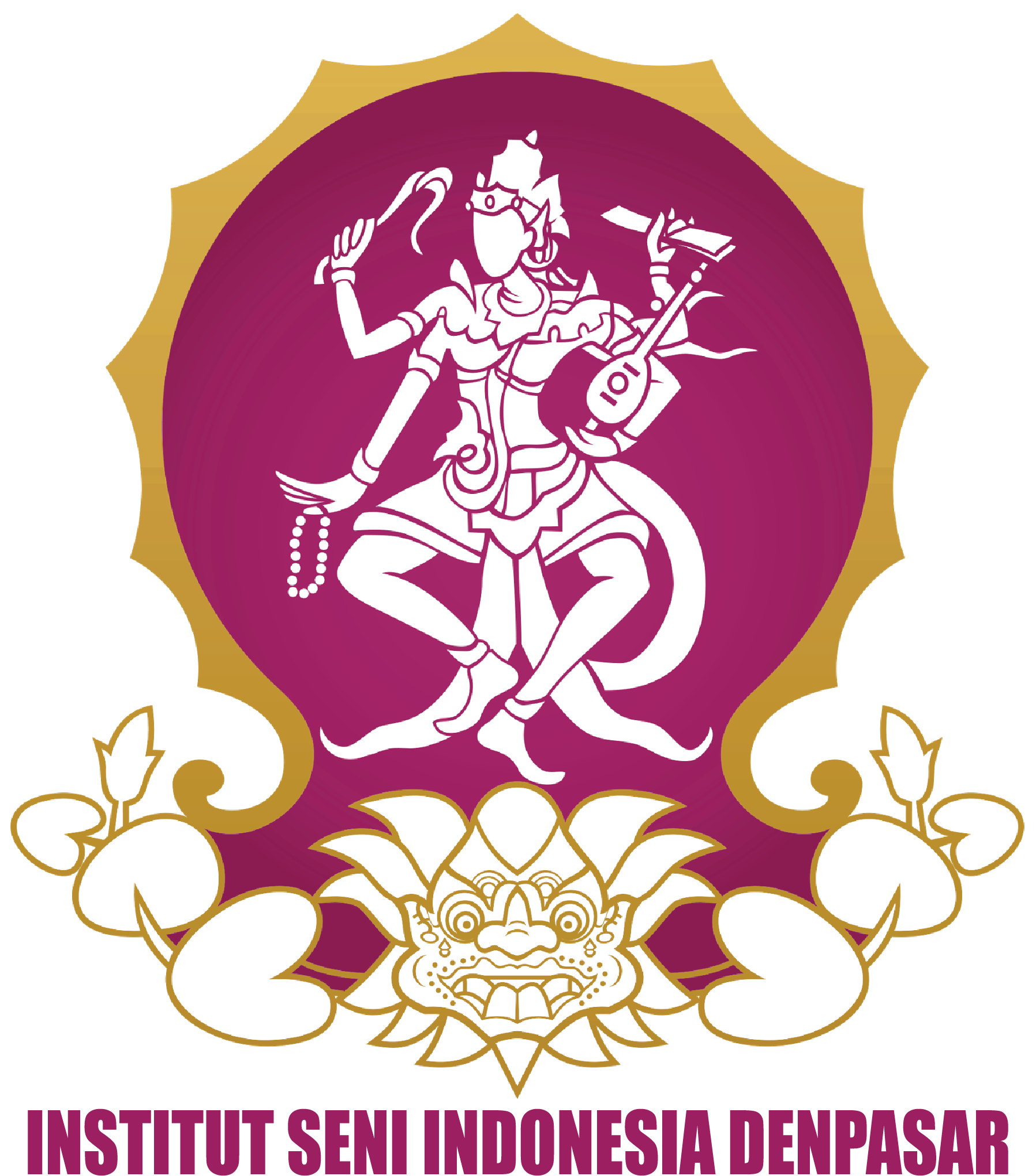
- Indonesian Institute of Arts, Bali's Symbol
- Type: State
- Established: 28 July 2003 (inaugurated)
- Rector: Prof. Dr. I Wayan Adnyana, S.Sn., M.Sn.
- Location: Denpasar, Bali, Indonesia; 8.653592°S 115.232639°E
- Campus: Urban
- Website: isibali.ac.id

Indonesian Institute of Arts Bali (Indonesian: Institut Seni Indonesia Denpasar; Balinese script: ᬇᬦ᭄ᬲ᭄ᬢᬶᬢᬸᬢ᭄ᬲᭂᬦᬶᬇᬦ᭄ᬤᭀᬦᬾᬲ᭄ᬬᬤᬾᬦ᭄ᬧᬲᬃ) abbreviated as ISI Bali is a college of art in Denpasar, Bali, Indonesia organized by the Ministry of National Education which is under and directly responsible to the Minister of National Education. ISI Denpasar functionally supervised by the Director General of Higher Education Department of Education. ISI Denpasar was established in 2003 which is the integration of the Indonesian Arts College (STSI) in Denpasar and Study Program of Art and Design (PSSRD) of Udayana University.

== History ==
STSI Denpasar, originally named Indonesian Dance Academy (ASTI) Denpasar, was established by the provincial government of Bali on January 28, 1967, on the initiative of the Advisory Council and Development of Culture (Listibya). Some forms of traditional arts of Bali are feared to become extinct, so the institute provides art education for the younger generation.

After two years of existence, ASTI Denpasar received status from the Ministry of Education and Culture in 1969 and ASTI Denpasar declared as majors from ASTI Yogyakarta that its management is handled by the Directorate General of Culture Ministry of Education and Culture. Over 8 (eight) last year, due to changes in organizational structure in the body of the Ministry of Education and Culture, since 1976 the ASTI Denpasar management is handled by the Directorate General of Higher Education, as well as fostering directed to the formation of Indonesian Arts Institute (ISI), along with colleges other arts in Indonesia. By Decree of the Minister of Education and Culture, the Indonesian Dance Academy in Denpasar upgraded to the College of Arts of Indonesia (STSI) Denpasar. Establishment of STSI Denpasar was confirmed by Presidential Decree.

Since October 1, 1965 PSSRD the Fine Arts Department Faculty of Engineering, Udayana University. Based on the decision of the Rector of Udayana, Udayana PSSRD formed inter-faculty study programs, strengthened by the Decree of Directorate General of Higher Education Department of Education in carrying out its functions Tridharma Higher Education.

The regional government of Bali and the Balinese people then prepared to integrate two art institutions with PSSRD Unud STSI Denpasar into one college of art, since 1993 continued in 1999. On July 28, 2003 Minister of National Education (Prof. Drs. Abdul Malik Fadjar, M. Sc) inaugurated the establishment of ISI Denpasar, marked by the signing of inscriptions located in Building Natya Mandala ISI Denpasar.

== Academics ==
ISI Denpasar offers twelve courses through the Faculty of Performing Arts and the Faculty of Art and Design:

- Dance
- Dance, drama and music
- Music
- Puppetry art
- Karawitan
- Fine Arts
- Art Craft
- Interior Design
- Visual Communication Design
- Photography (stub for the Faculty of Media Records)
- Fashion Design
- Film
