= Gino Robair =

American jazz musician

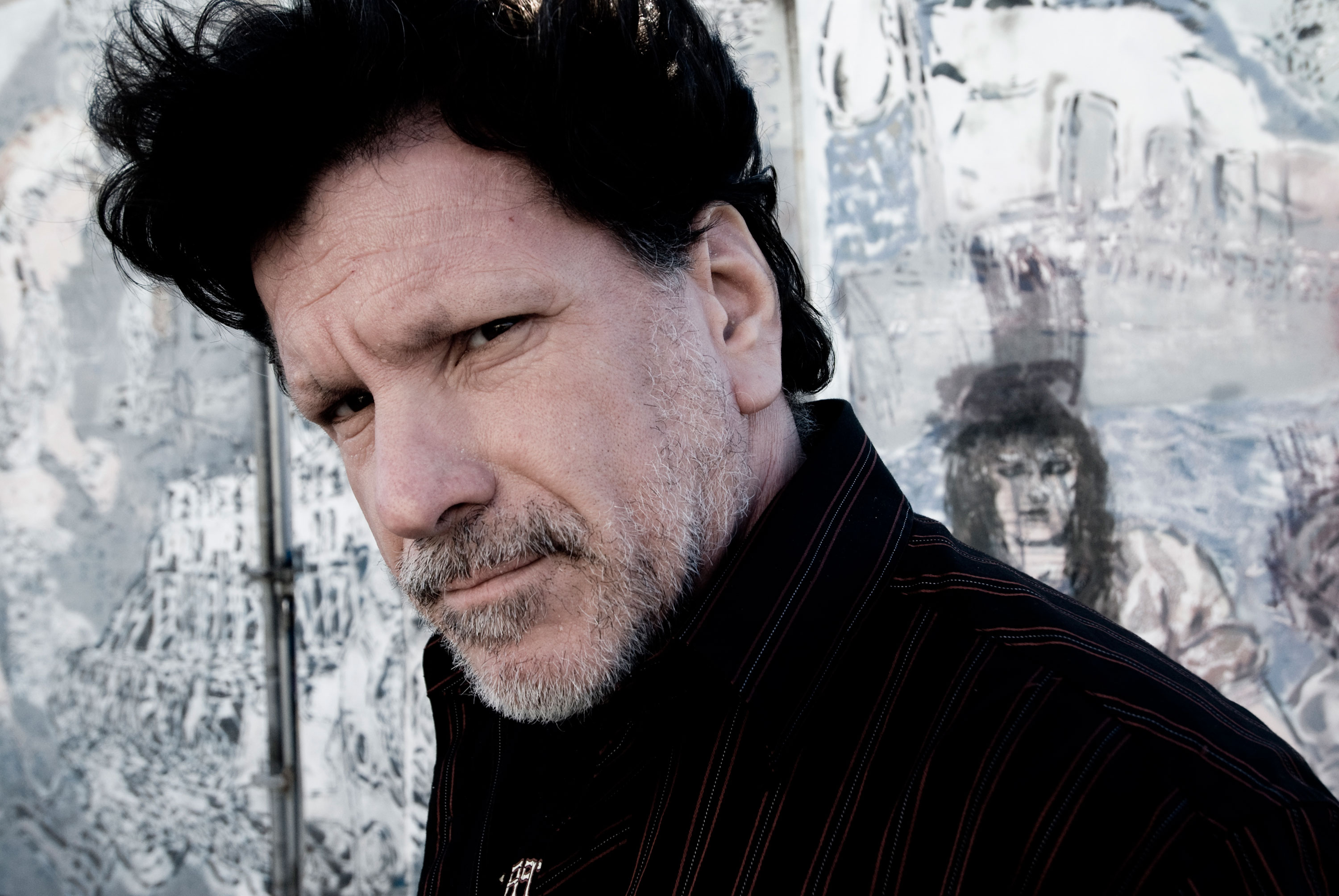
- Photograph taken by Jane Richey
- Occupation: composer
- Website: https://www.ginorobair.com/

Gino Robair is an American composer, improvisor, drummer, percussionist, and magazine editor. In his own music work (as a soloist and in improvisation ensembles), he plays prepared/modified percussion, analog synthesizer, ebow and prepared piano, theremin, and bowed objects (polystyrene, customized/broken cymbals, faux daxophone, metal). Robair resides in the San Francisco Bay Area, California.

== Biography ==
Gino Robair has recorded with Anthony Braxton, Tom Waits, John Butcher, LaDonna Smith, Otomo Yoshihide, Terry Riley, Lou Harrison, Eugene Chadbourne, Club Foot Orchestra, ROVA Saxophone Quartet, Birgit Ulher, Beth Custer, and Fred Frith, and many others. In addition, he has performed with John Zorn, Nina Hagen, and Thinking Fellers Union Local 282. He is a founding member of the groups Splatter Trio, and Pink Mountain.

From January 4, 1994 to January 14, 1997, "The Dark Circle Lounge" was a weekly improvisational music series, that later became a festival, founded and led by Gino Robair at the Hotel Utah. The Bay Area Improv Scene participated in The Dark Circle Lounge. At the time, Robair was a member of the Splatter Trio, alongside saxophonist Dave Barrett, and guitarist-bassist Myles Boisen.

It is not always clear what instruments Robair is playing (for example, the duo CD "Sputter" with Birgit Ulher). In interviews (Paris Transatlantic, The Wire), he notes that the term "energized surfaces" refers to the use of drums as resonators for other objects, which he bows, scrapes, rubs, or activates with an ebow, motors, or compressed air through a horn. "Voltage made audible" is used to describe analog electronics and circuit bent instruments.

As a composer, Robair has written pieces for a variety of ensembles (including the ROVA Saxophone Quartet), scored numerous Shakespearean plays with the California Shakespeare Festival (where he was music director for five years), and created jingles for radio and television. He also served as music director and composer (within the Club Foot Orchestra) for the CBS/Film Roman Saturday morning cartoon series "The Twisted Tales of Felix the Cat".

His large-scale work, "I, Norton," is an opera based on the life of Emperor Norton, which combines improvisation, graphic scores, game pieces, and fully notated scores. The piece was featured in the documentary Noisy People, by Tim Perkis. Robair is currently involved in a multi-year research project developing real-time, computer-mediated, ensemble-improvisation systems with Palle Dahlstedt (Chalmers University, Gothenburg, Sweden), Per Anders Nilsson (Academy of Music and Drama, Gothenburg, Sweden), and Tim Perkis. This project grew out of The Bucket System developed by Dahstedt, Nilsson and Robair and presented at the 2015 NIME conference. Robair is also a member of Anne Pajunen’s Stockholm-based S.M.O.K (Svenska Moderna Operaensemblen) 2.0, producing theatrical works with live electronics.

Gino Robair is the former editor-in-chief of Electronic Musician magazine, and Keyboard magazine. He has written for Mix, Option, Remix, Guitar Player, and Acoustic Guitar magazines, authored two books—Making the Ultimate Demo (Artistpro, 2000) and The Ultimate Personal Recording Studio (Cengage, 2006)—and contributed chapters to Less Noise, More Soul (Hal Leonard, 2013) and The Hub: Pioneers of Network Music (Kehrer Verlag, 2021). Robair is a member of the San Francisco Chapter of the Recording Academy/Grammys and served a term as national trustee. He has presented papers and chaired roundtable discussions at then NAMM, AES, and New Interfaces for Musical Expression (NIME) conferences.

His academic work includes composition studies with Barney Childs at the University of Redlands and Lou Harrison, David Rosenboom, and Larry Polansky at Mills College. He studied percussion with Ron George, William Kraft, William Winant, and Eddie Prévost of AMM. He also studied Javanese Gamelan with Jody Diamond, and wrote several works for the instruments. Robair is currently pursuing a PhD in Performance Studies at the University of California, Davis.

== Discography ==
- "Blue Moon" Sabrina Siegel, Gino Robair, Tania Chen, Tom Djll, Bryan Day, 2019
- "NoNoNo Percussion Ensemble: Excantatious" with Stefano Giust and Cristiano Calcagnile, Setola di Maiale (Italy) SM4340, 2021. CD.
- "Trio Music Minus One (For Dennis Palmer)" with Thollem McDonas, Setola di Maiale (Italy) SM2650, 2014. CD.
- "I, Norton: an opera in real time." Rastascan Records, 2009. CD.
- "Postage Paid Duets - Vol. 2" David Sait w/Glen Hall w/Gino Robair w/LaDonna Smith. Apprise AP-03, 2009. CD.
- "Other Destinations" (solo). Rastascan Records (San Francisco). CD.
- "Singular Pleasures" (solo). Rastascan Records (San Francisco). CD.
- "Sputter" with Birgit Ulher (tpt). Creative Sources (Lisbon, Portugal). CD.
- "New Oakland Burr" with John Butcher. Rastascan Records (San Francisco). CD.
- "Blood Money," "Alice," "Orphans," "The Tiger and the Snow" and "Bad As Me" with Tom Waits.
- "Duets 1987," "Nine Compositions (DVD) 2003," and "Six Compositions (GTM) 2001" with Anthony Braxton.
- "Grosse Abfahrt: Luftschiffe zum Kalifornien" 2007 Serge Baghdassarians - electronics; Boris Baltschun - electronics; Chris Brown - piano; Tom Djll - trumpet; Matt Ingalls - clarinet; Tim Perkis - electronics; Gino Robair - electronics; John Shiurba - guitar. Creative Sources (Lisbon, Portugal). CD.
- "Supermodel Supermodel" 2006 Gail Brand trombone; Tim Perkis electronics; Gino Robair percussion, faux dax, horns, Styrofoam, ebow snare; John Shiurba electric guitar; Matthew Sperry double bass and preparations. On Emanem (UK). CD.
- "Six Fuchs" 2004 Wolfgang Fuchs (reeds), Tom Dill(tpt), Gino Robair(perc), John Shiurba(gtr), Matthew Sperry(bass), and Tim Perkis (electronics). Rastascan Records (San Francisco). CD
- "Gino Robair Live on the Artship" 2002 The Artship Recordings are a series of live solo improvisations each by a different artist, and each performed in "The Artship", a decommissioned US Navy troop transport which was docked in Oakland and served as a floating arts center for several years. (3.5-in CD).
- "Buddy Systems" 1998 Gino Robair plays selected duos and trios, with John Butcher and Tim Perkis, Otomo Yoshihide, Carl Kihlstedt and Matthew Sperry, Dan Plonsey, LaDonna Smith, Splatter Trio, Oluyemi Thomas, and Myles Boisen On Meniscus(Minneapolis). CD
- "Matthew Sperry Trio" 1997 Actually a quartet, that didn't include the late Matthew Sperry! Matt Ingalls, Tim Perkis, Gino Robair, John Shiurba. On Limited Sedition (Oakland). CD

== See also ==
- Bay Area Improv Scene
