= Bottom of the Hill =

Concert venue in San Francisco, California

- Bottom
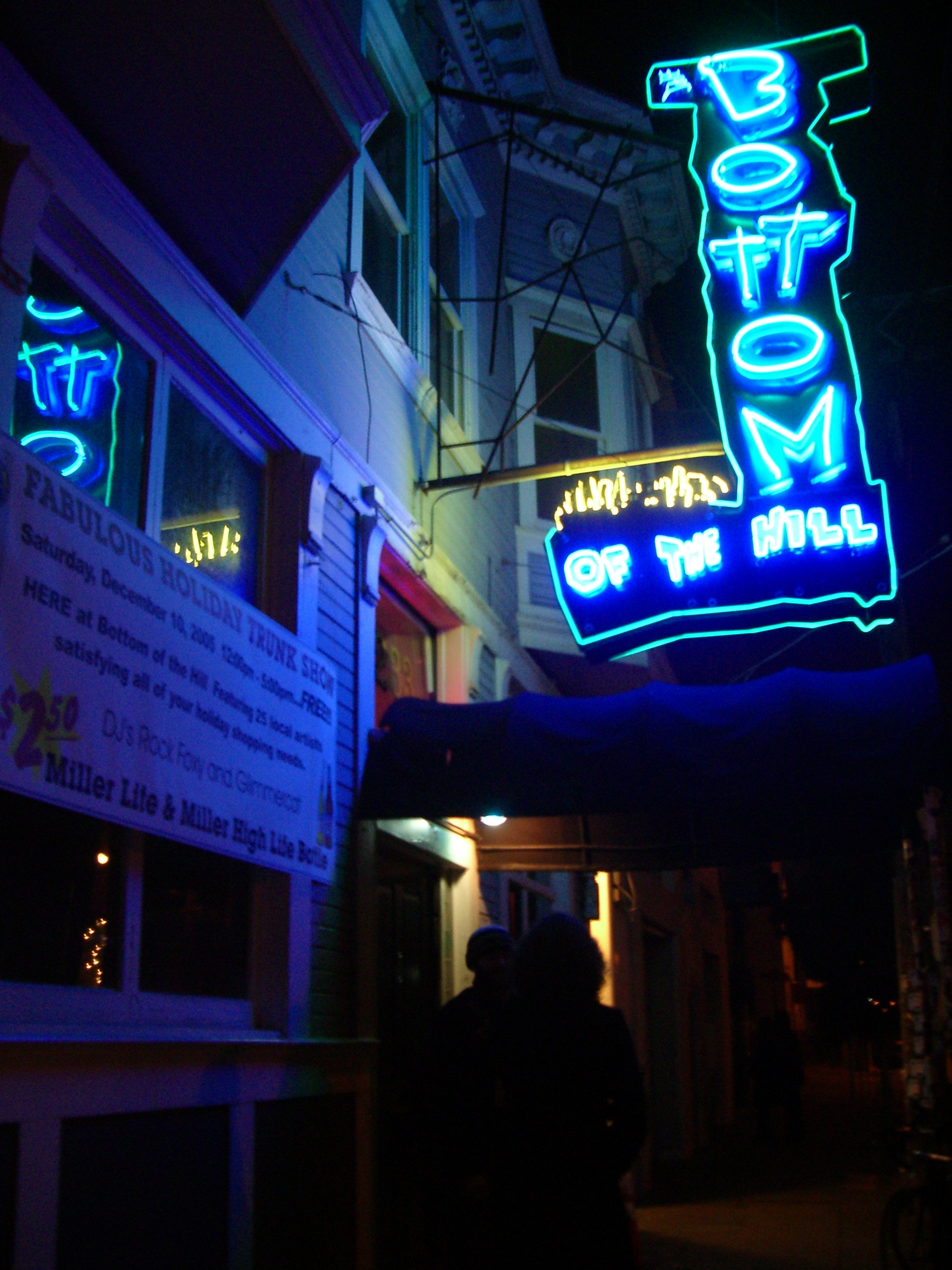
- Bottom of the Hill at night
- Interactive map of Bottom of the Hill
- Address: 1233 17th Street
- Location: Potrero Hill District, San Francisco, California
- Coordinates: 37.76514°N 122.39618°W
- Owner: Tim Benetti, Ramona Downey, Kathleen Owens, Lynn Schwartz
- Type: Music venue, Concert venue
- Events: Acoustic rock, alternative rock, blues, electronic, folk, garage, groove, hard rock, indie, punk, reggae, rock, surf

Construction
- Built: 1911
- Opened: September 1991

Bottom of the Hill is a concert venue located at the corner of 17th and Missouri streets in the Potrero Hill district of San Francisco, California. According to Rolling Stone, the Bottom of the Hill is the best place to hear live music in San Francisco (RS 813). It has repeatedly won the Readers' Poll Best of The Bay award for Rock venue, including 10 years in a row from 2003 to 2012. Bottom is described as the heart of San Francisco's indie rock scene and is among the most active venues in the city, usually holding shows seven nights a week. The venue contains a large antique bar, kitchen serving hot food, and patio. In January 2026, it was announced the venue would be closing by the end of the year.

== Background ==
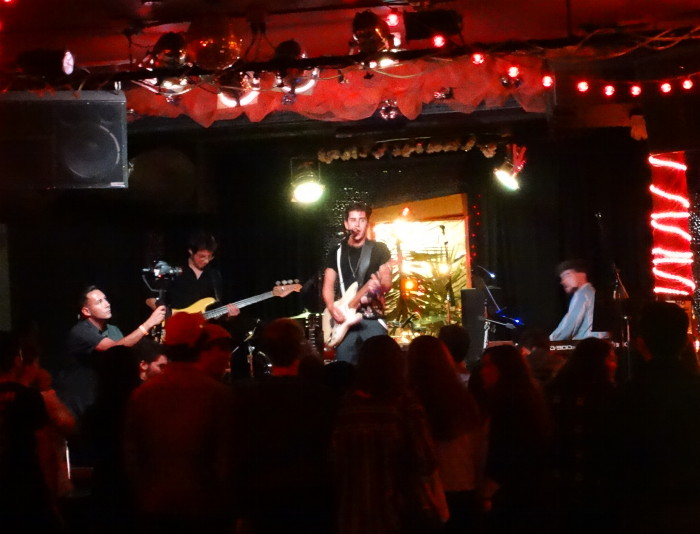
Josiah Johnson of The Head and the Heart on stage at The Bottom of the Hill (August 2018)

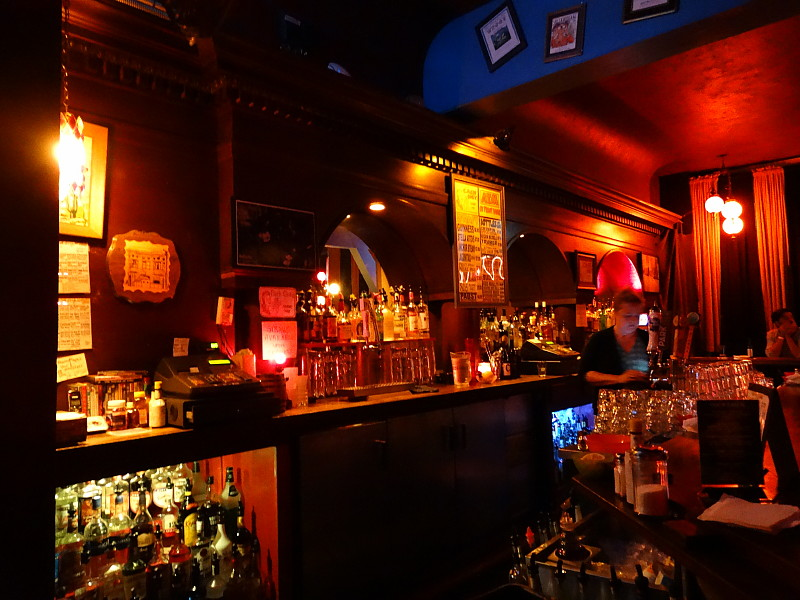
Antique bar at Bottom of the Hill (August 2018)

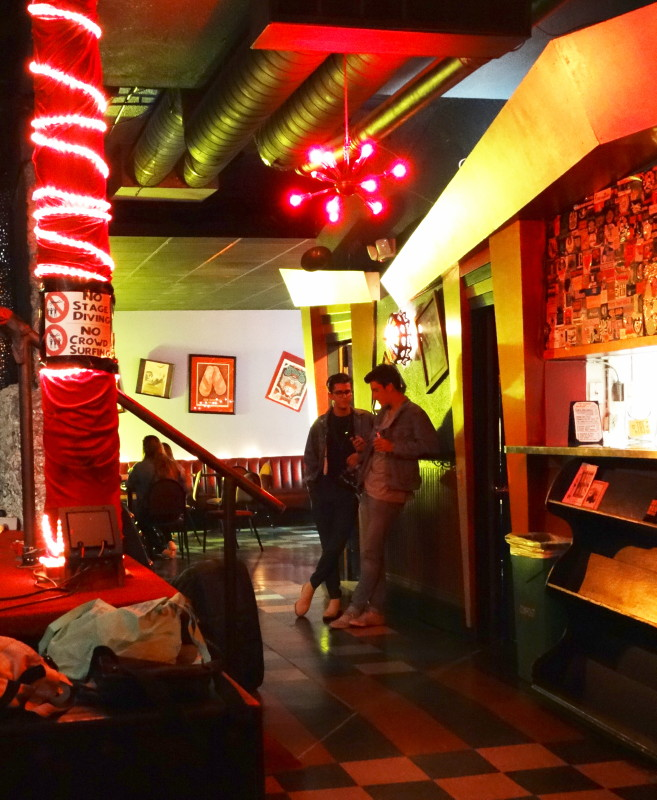
View from side of stage into the back room at Bottom of the Hill (August 2018)

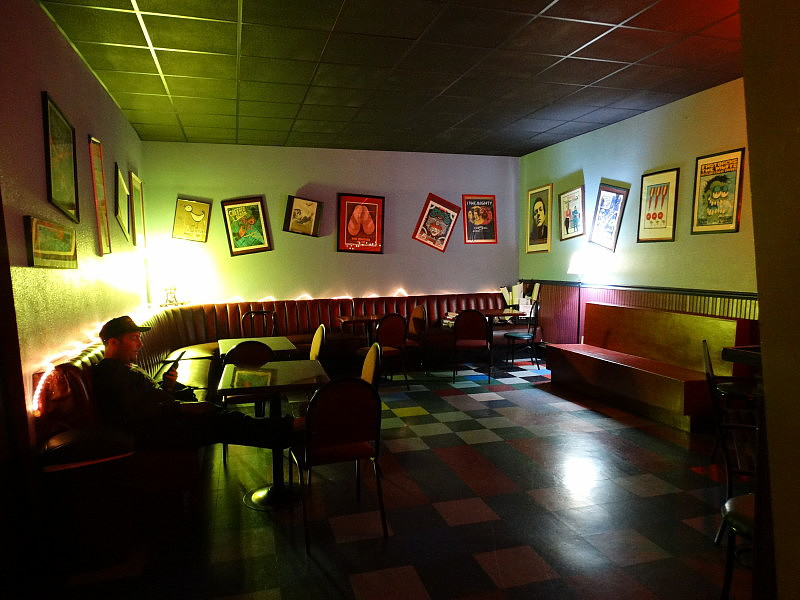
Back room at Bottom of the Hill (August 2018)

Bottom of the Hill, or "Bottom" for short, has been a live music venue since Dave Benetti opened it in September 1991. The club is known as a great starting venue for emerging rock, grunge, and indie bands. The venue has hosted a huge number of now-famous artists when they were still relatively unknown, including Arcade Fire, Avail, Bad Religion, Beastie Boys, Black Rebel Motorcycle Club, Blink 182, Bright Eyes, Cake, Cat Power, Death Cab for Cutie, Elliott Smith, Fu Manchu, fun., Green Day, Kid Rock, Lush, Marilyn Manson, Alanis Morissette, Nashville Pussy, Neutral Milk Hotel, Oasis, Queens of the Stone Age, The Donnas, The Flaming Lips, The Mighty Mighty Bosstones, The Strokes, and The White Stripes, among many others. Unlike many venues, the management also holds all-ages shows and reaches out to younger artists. Similar venues in other cities include The Saint in Asbury Park, NJ, The Ottobar in Baltimore, MD, and the Iron Horse Music Hall in Northampton, MA.

Bottom of the Hill offers an intimate setting with high quality acoustics in most parts of the venue. It is a small venue that allows patrons to be close to the performers, with front and side views of the artists for photography; a rear view if you count the plexiglass window behind the stage. According to Benzuly, the sound set up features "EAW ASR 695 bi-amped mains, which have recently been upgraded with 1,000-watt woofers, all powered by Crest 7001 amps. Front-of-house engineers can use the venue's Yamaha PM3500 40-channel board; outboard gear comprises TC Electronic M1, Yamaha Rev-500, Roland SDE-1000, dbx 266 compressor/gates, Drawmer 241 compressor/gates, Symetrix compressor and AL gates. For monitoring, the venue provides four discrete mixes (three front, one drumfill) of Community boxes powered by Crest amps, as well as two Community VBS415 subs powered by a Crown MacroTech 5000 amp." (p. 108)

In the 1990s, part of the upstairs was turned into a recording studio, enabling the venue to record and live stream its shows. In 2003, a fire damaged the building's upper floor office, ending this practice.

Bottom of the Hill is an important part of the local community. In 2009, the California Department of Alcoholic Beverage Control, targeted all-ages venues, including Bottom of the Hill. The agency required that at least 50% of the club's revenue come from restaurant rather than bar sales, which could have closed the venue. In response, Bottom of the Hill's neighbors sent in letters of support, stating that "the venue was an integral part of the neighborhood," which made a difference in the decision to allow the venue to remain open.

== History of the location and management ==
The Bottom of the Hill is located at the foot of Potrero Hill, in a two-story Edwardian style building built in 1911. At that time, the neighborhood was occupied by Italian and working-class families who worked at the nearby shipyards and warehouses. The building was originally a saloon and eatery, called "17th Street Restaurant." It subsequently housed a soda fountain (1930s), possibly a speakeasy during prohibition, and a family-owned restaurant (from the 1960s to 1990s).

Dave Benetti purchased the restaurant and its entertainment license around 1990, and named it "Bottom of the Hill" when it reopened in 1991. Benetti was a music and art lover, and began to book local punk and rock artists at night and exhibit art on the walls. It achieved more success as a music venue than a restaurant, so restaurant services were reduced, the physical space expanded to better accommodate a larger stage and audience, and the now-iconic sign was hung outside. By 1995, the co-owners were Tim Benetti, Ramona Downey, Kathleen Owen. Some years later, Lynn Schwarz also became an owner. Ramona Downey served as booking agent for the first 26 years and then Lynn took over as booker.

== Media ==
In media, Green Day filmed a live show for MTV called Live at the 10-Spot there and NOFX refers to the club in their song "Scavenger Type," in which the protagonist is gigging there. Significant events include a riot that broke out in 1996 when a radio DJ leaked news that the Beastie Boys were playing a show under the name "Quasar" and fans swarmed the venue.
