= Myles Boisen =

- Born: Myles Boisen; October 19, 1956 (age 69); Omaha, Nebraska, United States
- Education: Fairhaven College (BA, 1979)
- Genres: Avant-garde jazz; Experimental music; free improvisation
- Occupations: Musician, composer, record producer, sound engineer, journalist
- Instruments: Guitar, bass guitar
- Years active: 1979–present
- Formerly of: Splatter Trio, Club Foot Orchestra
- Website: mylesboisen.com

Myles Boisen (born October 19, 1956) is an American guitarist, composer, record producer and sound engineer based in the San Francisco Bay Area. He was a member of several bands, including Splatter Trio and the Club Foot Orchestra, and has collaborated with a number of musicians, including Fred Frith, John Zorn and Henry Kaiser. Boisen has also released four solo albums.

Boisen is the owner and lead engineer of the Guerrilla Recording studio and the Headless Buddha Mastering Lab in Oakland, California. He has recorded, mastered and produced over 150 recordings by groups and musicians. Boisen has been described as a "beyond-jazz pioneer", and his music, "unheard of" and "highly flammable".

== Biography ==
Boisen was born in Omaha, Nebraska on October 19, 1956. He was raised in Seattle, Washington, and has since moved to Berkeley, California. He obtained a BA degree in 1979 in 20th-Century Media and Contemporary Art from Fairhaven College at Western Washington University.

Boisen's music is primarily avant-garde jazz, experimental and free improvisation, often using prepared guitars. He plays a custom-built double-neck guitar and bass, with a Gibson SG-shaped body and necks. In 1980, Boisen studied with Robert Fripp in London, and remarked that he "still retain[s] much of [Fripp's] approach, specifically the use of left-hand exercises based on classical technique and the importance of equal facility with all four fingers". Boisen also stated that his performances with Fred Frith have influenced his own playing, specifically the way he prepares his guitars using found objects.

In the late 1980s to mid-1990s, Boisen was a member of the West Coast experimental music group, Splatter Trio, where Boisen played his double-neck guitar and bass, Dave Barrett played saxophone, and Gino Robair played drums. The trio was formed in 1987 by Barrett after he watched Boisen and Robair performing in John Zorn's game piece, Cobra. Writing in Guitar Player, music critic Mark Dery described Boisen's guitar/bass playing in the trio as "splatter jazz", which he defined as "a musical genre that invites comparison to both action painting and moviemaker Sam Peckinpah's abstract expressionist tableaux of bullet-pecked bodies and flying gobbets of blood." Splatter Trio recorded five albums before splitting up in 1995. In the early 1990s, Boisen co-produced the Bay Area Improvised Music Festival held annually at Berkeley, California.

During the 1990s, Boisen was a member of the Club Foot Orchestra, where he was composer and played bass guitar. The ensemble created silent film scores for, amongst others, Fritz Lang's Metropolis, G. W. Pabst's Pandora's Box and Buster Keaton's Sherlock Jr.. The Club Foot Orchestra's recording of Sherlock Jr.'s soundtrack was produced by Boisen, and was used on the film's commercial video release by Kino Lorber in 2024. Boisen and the Club Foot Orchestra scored and recorded the soundtrack for the first season of Film Roman's The Twisted Tales of Felix the Cat. In the late 1990s, Boisen became musical director of the Orchestra Nostalgico, an offshoot of the Club Foot Orchestra established to perform live film music.

Boisen also composed soundtrack music for MTV, CBS, and played guitar on the soundtrack of David Lynch's film, Twin Peaks: Fire Walk with Me. Boisen was the sound engineer on The Gorey End by the Tiger Lillies with the Kronos Quartet, which received a 2004 Grammy Award. His production of the CD release of Born to Sing the Blues by Clarence Sims received "Best West Coast blues reissue" and "Best studio sound technique" awards in 1999 from Real Blues Magazine.

Boisen's solo albums were generally well received by critics. Reviewing Guitarspeak in The Rocket, Patrick Barber stated that the album covers eight years of Boisen's work, and is "a first-rate look into his many-faceted musical mind". Mark Corroto wrote in All About Jazz that Scrambledisc is a "collage" of taped live performance and recordings of his guitar, manipulated to create a "sonic painting" that is "scary, noisy, and dense". In a review in Jazziz magazine, Sam Prestianni noted that on Past-Present-Future, Boisen demonstrates that he is "a legitimate bluesman with deep knowledge of the genre's legacy and a knack for making its sound his own".

As a journalist, Boisen has made contributions to the SF Weekly newspaper, the Down Home Guide to the Blues book, and is the Roots and Rhythm magazine record review editor. He has also written over 40 articles on electronic equipment for Electronic Musician.

== Discography ==
=== Solo ===
- Accidental Dialects (1989, Cassette, A Small Tribe)
- Guitarspeak (1994, CD, Rastascan)
- Scrambledisc (Guitarspeak Vol 2.) (2000, CD, Wiggle Biscuit)
- Past-Present-Future (2003, CD, A Small Tribe)

=== Collaborations ===
With Eric Muhs

- Notochord (1990, CD, Invisible Music)

With Fred Frith, Jean Derome, Pierre Tanguay

- All Is Bright, But It Is Not Day (2002, CD, Ambiances Magnétiques)

With Jon Raskin

- Music + One (2006, CD, Rastascan)

With Henry Kaiser

- Hard Left / Hard Right (2020, FLAC, Not on Label)
