= SENI =

Seni may refer to:

- Seni Pramoj (1905—1997), former Thai prime minister
- Seni Awa Camara (b. c. 1945), a Senegalese sculptor
- Ole Seni, a settlement in Kenya's Rift Valley Province
- Gumbat, also known as Seni Gumbat, a town in Khyber Pakhtunkhwa, Pakistan
- The Central Market (Malay: Pasar Seni) in Kuala Lumpur
  - The Pasar Seni LRT station, in Kuala Lumpur
- Prasasti Seni, an album by Malaysian pop singer Siti Nurhaliza
- Seni rebab, a plucked string instrument most associated with Sikh music
- Seni Gayung Fatani, a Malaysian style of silat

SENI, as an acronym, may refer to:

- Scincidae Ecological Niche Index
- Special Education Needs and Inclusion

Seni is also a word in Indonesian, which may refer to:

- Institut Seni Indonesia (Indonesian: Institute of the Arts of Indonesia):
- Sekolah Tinggi Seni Indonesia (disambiguation) (Indonesian: Advanced school for the arts of Indonesia)
