= National Institute of Arts =

National Institute of (the) Arts may refer to:

- Universidad Nacional de las Artes, Argentina
- National Institute of Arts, Kinshasa, Democratic Republic of the Congo
- National Taiwan University of Arts
- Taipei National University of the Arts

== See also ==
- American Academy of Arts and Letters, formerly National Institute of Arts and Letters
- Institut Seni Indonesia (disambiguation)
