= Pasar Seni station =

LRT and MRT interchange in Kuala Lumpur, Malaysia

KJ14 KG16 Pasar Seni
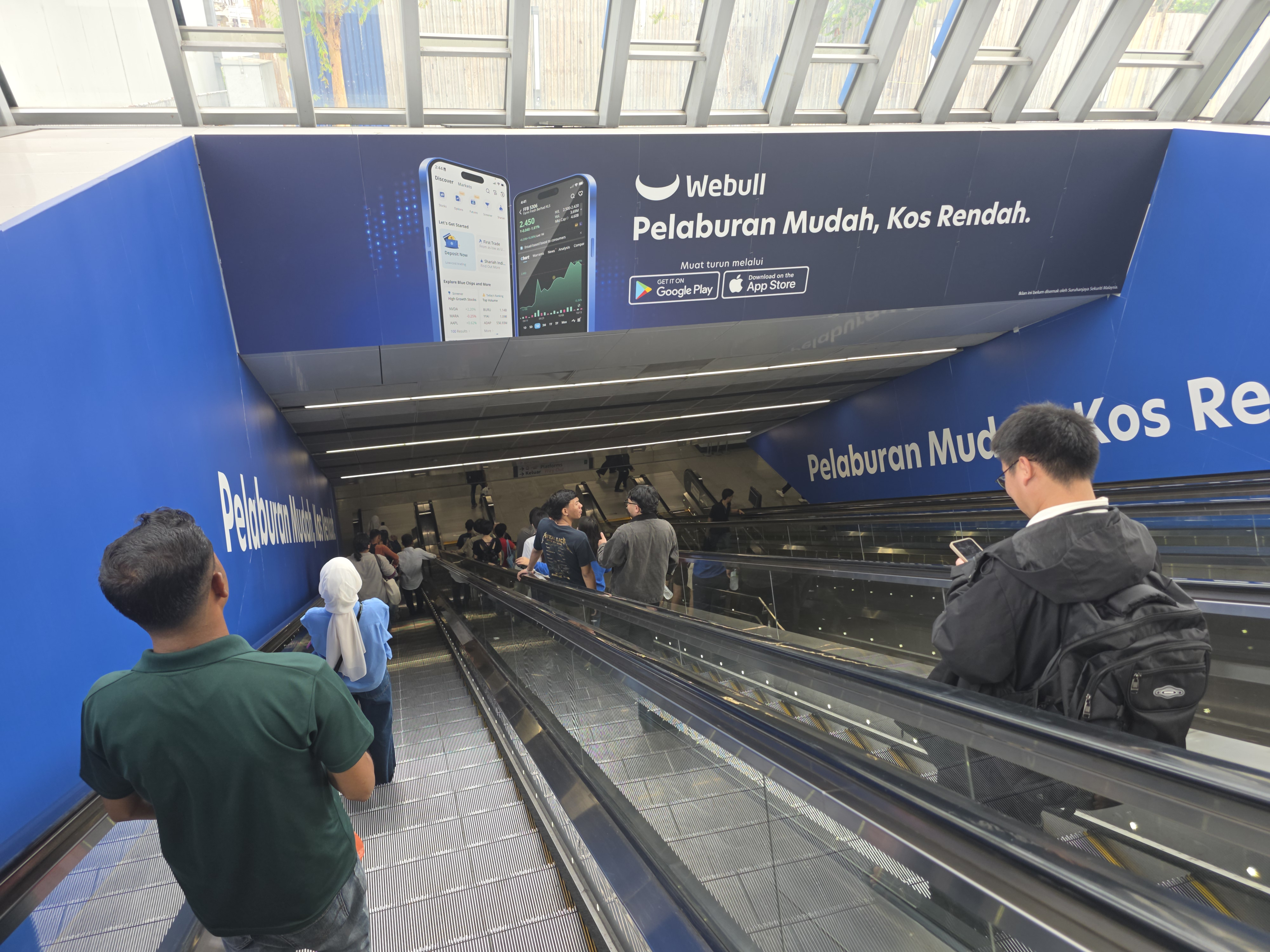
- View when transferring from the Pasar Seni LRT station to the MRT station

General information
- Other names: Malay: ڤاسر سني (Jawi); Chinese: 中央艺术坊; Tamil: பசார் செனி
- Location: Nearby Central Market, City Centre; 50000 Kuala Lumpur; Malaysia
- Coordinates: 3°08′33″N 101°41′43″E
- System: Rapid KL
- Owner: Prasarana Malaysia (LRT); MRT Corp (MRT)
- Operator: Rapid Rail
- Lines: 5 Kelana Jaya Line; 9 Kajang Line
- Platforms: 1 island platform (LRT); 1 island platform (MRT)
- Tracks: 2 (LRT); 2 (MRT)
- Connections: Connecting station to KA02 Kuala Lumpur for KTM Komuter and KTM ETS

Construction
- Structure type: KJ14 Elevated; KG16 Underground
- Depth: 25.1 metres (82 ft)
- Platform levels: 2
- Parking: Available at nearby KTM station
- Cycle facilities: Not available
- Accessible: Available

Other information
- Station code: KJ14 KG16

History
- Opened: 1 September 1998; 28 years ago (LRT); 17 July 2017; 9 years ago (MRT)

Services
Preceding station		Following station
Masjid Jamek towards Gombak	Kelana Jaya Line	Kuala Lumpur Sentral towards Putra Heights
Muzium Negara towards Kwasa Damansara	Kajang Line	Merdeka towards Kajang
Location

The Pasar Seni station is an integrated rapid transit station in Kuala Lumpur that is served by the LRT Kelana Jaya Line and the MRT Kajang Line. The station is named after the nearby Central Market (known as Pasar Seni or "Art Market" in Malay) and is located near Petaling Street and the area known as the Chinatown of Kuala Lumpur.

The station is made up of two parts - the older elevated Kelana Jaya Line station and platforms which opened on 1 September 1998 and the newer underground Kajang Line station and platforms which opened on 17 July 2017. A pedestrian bridge and escalators link the paid areas of both stations, allowing commuters to conveniently transfer between the Kelana Jaya Line and the Kajang Line, while two unpaid linkways connect the Pasar Seni station complex directly with the Kuala Lumpur station, which is served by the KTM Komuter and KTM ETS services.

The station is located next to the Jalan Sultan Mohamed bus hub with buses to Petaling Jaya, Shah Alam, Klang, Puchong and Subang Jaya as well as Go KL buses. Pedestrian bridges also link the station with the Kuala Lumpur General Post Office and the Dayabumi building.

== Station features and history ==
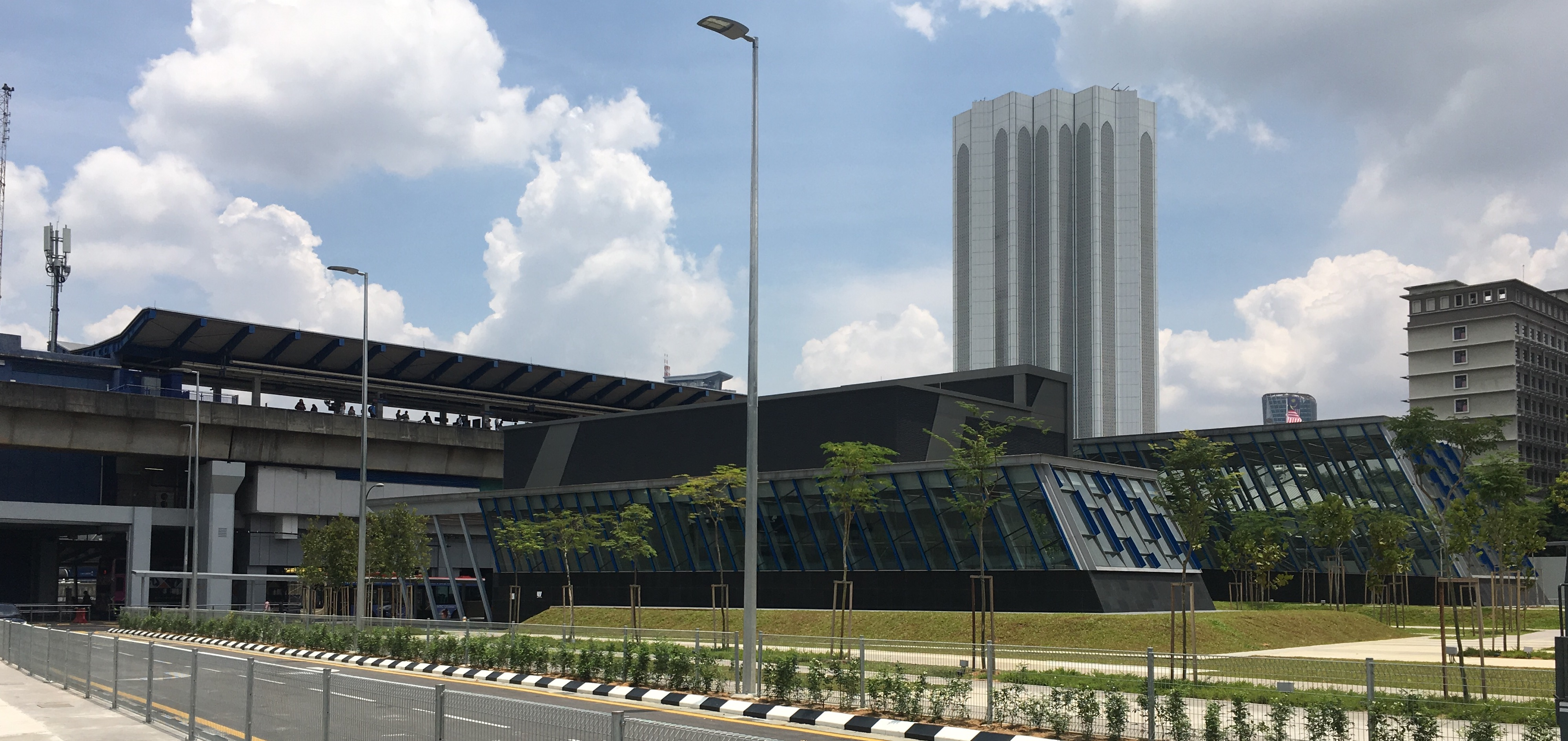
View of the elevated LRT station and the glass entrances of the underground MRT station

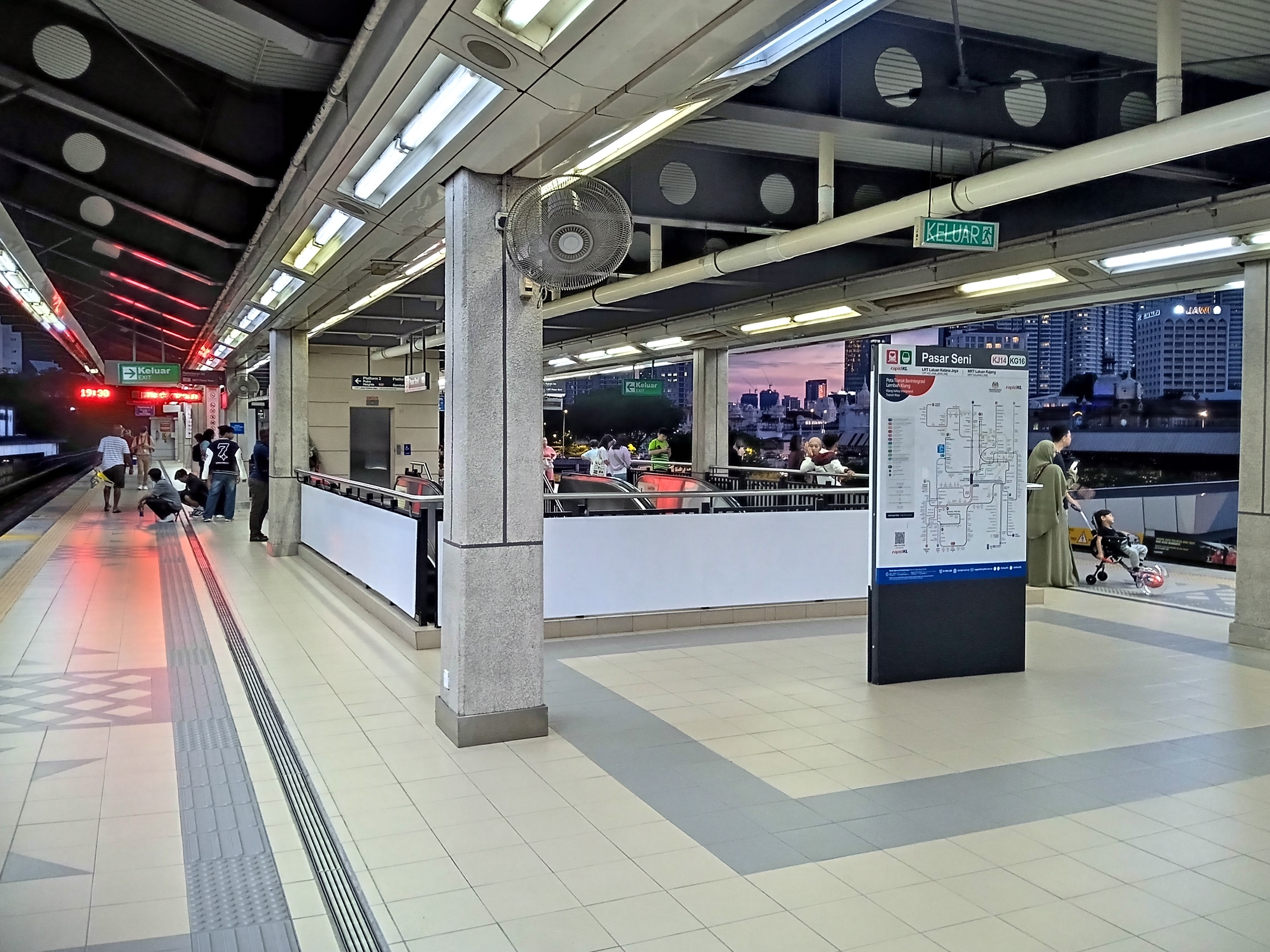
The Pasar Seni LRT platform

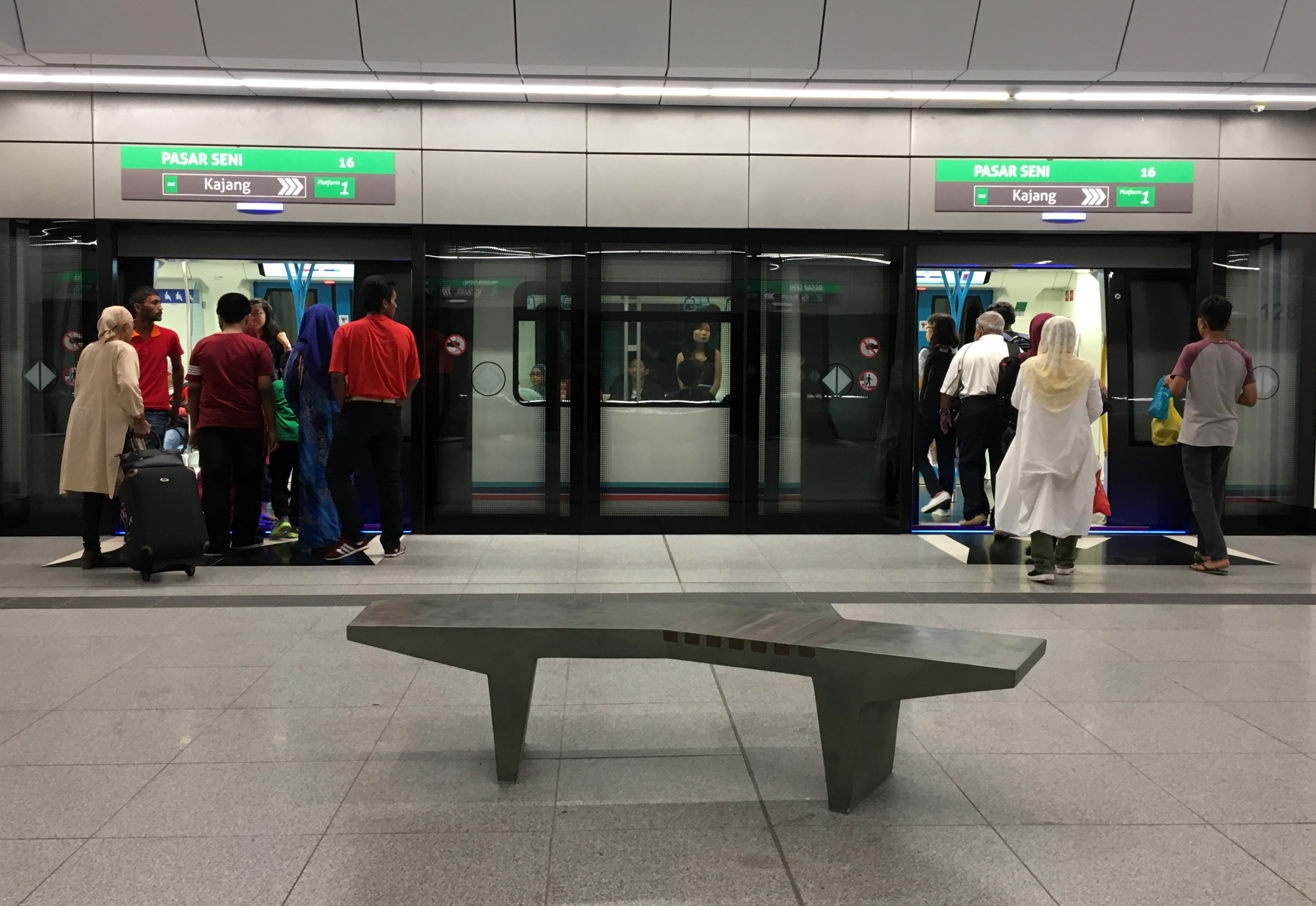
View of platform level of the MRT station

=== LRT Kelana Jaya Line station ===
The elevated Pasar Seni LRT station is served by the LRT Kelana Jaya Line, a light rapid transit (LRT) system, and began operations on 1 September 1998 as the terminus of Phase One of what was then known as the PUTRA LRT system. The line would extend to Gombak in 1999 as part of Phase Two.

The LRT station has two elevated levels; a concourse level and a platform level above it, with an island platform configuration with two platforms.

The station entrance is on the Concourse Level which is accessed via escalators, stairs and lifts from Jalan Tun Tan Cheng Lock and Jalan Sultan Mohamed. Also at the Concourse Level are the fare gates, ticketing machines, Customer Service Counter, convenience store and bakery. The link bridges to the Kuala Lumpur station, Kuala Lumpur General Post Office and Dayabumi are also at the Concourse Level. A second air-conditioned link bridge to the old Kuala Lumpur station has been added since November 2019.

The ground level of the station is occupied by several bus lanes of the Jalan Sultan Mohamed bus hub. There is also a Rapid Bus Customer Service Office. Covered walkways link the station with the bus hub.

=== MRT Kajang Line station ===
The underground mass rapid transit (MRT) station began operations on 17 July 2017 when Phase Two of the MRT Kajang Line was opened.

The station was constructed at the site formerly occupied by the Klang Bus Stand, Plaza Wawasan Complex and the UO Shopping Centre. These three buildings were demolished in 2012 to make way for the MRT station to be constructed.

The station has three underground levels - Concourse Level, Plant Room Level (not accessible to public) and Platform Level - beneath the ground level plaza.

The design of the station entrance buildings at the ground level is based on the quartz found at Bukit Tabur quartz range in Gombak, Selangor, while the theme for the station's interior design is "Confluence", taken from the confluence between the Gombak and Klang Rivers, which is located next to Masjid Jamek, the preceding station on the Kelana Jaya Line. The MRT tunnels in this station is located only 300 meters from the opening of the Kelana Jaya Line's tunnel (towards Masjid Jamek).

=== LRT-MRT Link ===
The Pasar Seni LRT and MRT stations are connected by a pedestrian bridge over Jalan Sultan Mohamed. The bridge connects directly to the paid area of the LRT station's Concourse Level. On the MRT station side, escalators, stairs and lifts connect the pedestrian bridge directly to the paid area of the MRT Concourse Level, which is the first underground level of the station.

The paid-to-paid link is labelled as Entrance C of the station. It however only allows commuters to transfer between the LRT and MRT, and does not allow anyone out of the stations.

To accommodate this pedestrian bridge, the LRT station had to undergo some renovation. Besides removing the balustrade at the Concourse Level, the LRT station fare gates were also relocated closer to the entrance. A new service counter was also built replacing the older service counter.

=== Station layout ===
L2	LRT Platform Level	Platform 1: 5 Kelana Jaya Line towards KJ1 Gombak (→)
L2	LRT Platform Level	Island platform, Doors will open on the right
L2	LRT Platform Level	Platform 2: 5 Kelana Jaya Line towards KJ37 Putra Heights (←)
L1	LRT Concourse	Fare gates, Ticketing Machines, LRT Station Control, LRT Customer Service Office, LRT station entrance, Shops, Paid-to-paid pedestrian bridge between LRT and MRT stations, Pedestrian bridge to KA02 Kuala Lumpur station. Entrances C & E
G	Street Level	Taxi Terminal, Shops, RapidKL concession ticket counter. HAB Pasar Seni. Entrances A, B & D
B2	MRT Concourse	MRT Station Control, MRT Customer Service Office, Ticketing Machines, Fare gates, Entrance C paid-to-paid access to LRT concourse
B4	MRT Platform Level	Platform 1: 9 Kajang Line towards KG35 Kajang (→)
B4	MRT Platform Level	Island platform, doors will open on the right
B4	MRT Platform Level	Platform 2: 9 Kajang Line towards KG04 Kwasa Damansara (←)

=== Exits and entrances ===
Pasar Seni station has a total of 4 entrances/exits - Entrance A at Jalan Sultan and Entrance B at Jalan Sultan Mohamed, both belong to the MRT station. Entrance C is the given name for the paid-to-paid pedestrian link bridge between the LRT and MRT stations and is not an entrance from outside. Entrance D at Jalan Tun Tan Cheng Lock and Entrance E at the direct link to the Kuala Lumpur KTM Station are at the LRT station.

Kajang Line station
Entrance	Location	Destination	Picture
A	South side of Jalan Sultan	Kuala Lumpur Chinatown (Petaling Street, Jalan Sultan, Jalan Tun H.S. Lee, Jalan Panggong)	
B	East side of Jalan Sultan Mohamed	Jalan Bandar Traffic Police Headquarters, HAB Pasar Seni (Platform C, D, E)	
C LRT-MRT Linkway	Underground Concourse level with escalator to elevated linkway	LRT MRT	
Kelana Jaya Line station
C LRT-MRT Linkway	Escalator from Underground to Elevated Concourse level	LRT MRT	
D	South side of Jalan Tun Tan Cheng Lock	Jalan Sultan Mohamed Bus Hub, Central Market, Kuala Lumpur, Hang Kasturi Walk, Walkway to Kuala Lumpur General Post Office, Dayabumi	
E KTM-LRT Linkway	Concourse level	Unpaid link to KA02 Kuala Lumpur station	

=== Pasar Seni city bus terminal (HAB Pasar Seni) ===
A city bus terminal is integrated with the station complex, serving as the terminal for buses serving trunk routes primarily to the western side of Klang Valley.

==== RapidKL buses ====
Route number	Destination	Service type	Notes
151	Bandar Baru Selayang		Extended from the original Lebuh Pudu city bus terminal
180	Taman Dato Senu, Sentul	Trunk	
400	Damai Perdana	Trunk	Extended from the original Lebuh Pudu city bus terminal
450	Hentian Kajang (Jalan Reko terminal)	Trunk	Extended from the original Lebuh Pudu city bus terminal
580	Desa Petaling	Trunk	Extended from the original Lebuh Pudu city bus terminal
590	Bandar Sungai Long	Trunk	Extended from the original Lebuh Pudu city bus terminal
600	Puchong Utama	Trunk	
640	Taman Sri Manja, Petaling Jaya	Trunk	
650	Taman Desa	Trunk	
750	Seksyen 2, Shah Alam	Trunk	Serves Shah Alam city center area (Seksyen 14) and stops at Shah Alam City Bus Terminal. Also serves Universiti Teknologi MARA main campus (Seksyen 2 bound).
751	Taman Sri Muda, Shah Alam	Trunk	
770	Subang Mewah, USJ1	Trunk	
772	Subang Suria Mah Sing	Trunk	Serves Subang Skypark in both direction. Terminates at U5 terminal in Subang Bestari.
780	Kota Damansara	Trunk	
782	Petaling Jaya Old Town	Trunk	
821	Pantai Hillpark	Trunk	
851	Kuala Lumpur Courts Complex, Jalan Duta		

==== Non-RapidKL buses ====
Route number	Destination	Operator	Service type	Notes
PURPLE	Bukit Bintang	Go KL City Bus (operated by SKS)	Feeder	Loop service
700	Port Klang	Causeway Link	Trunk	
710	Klang	Wawasan Sutera	Trunk	
734	Banting	Wawasan Sutera	Trunk	

== Around the station ==
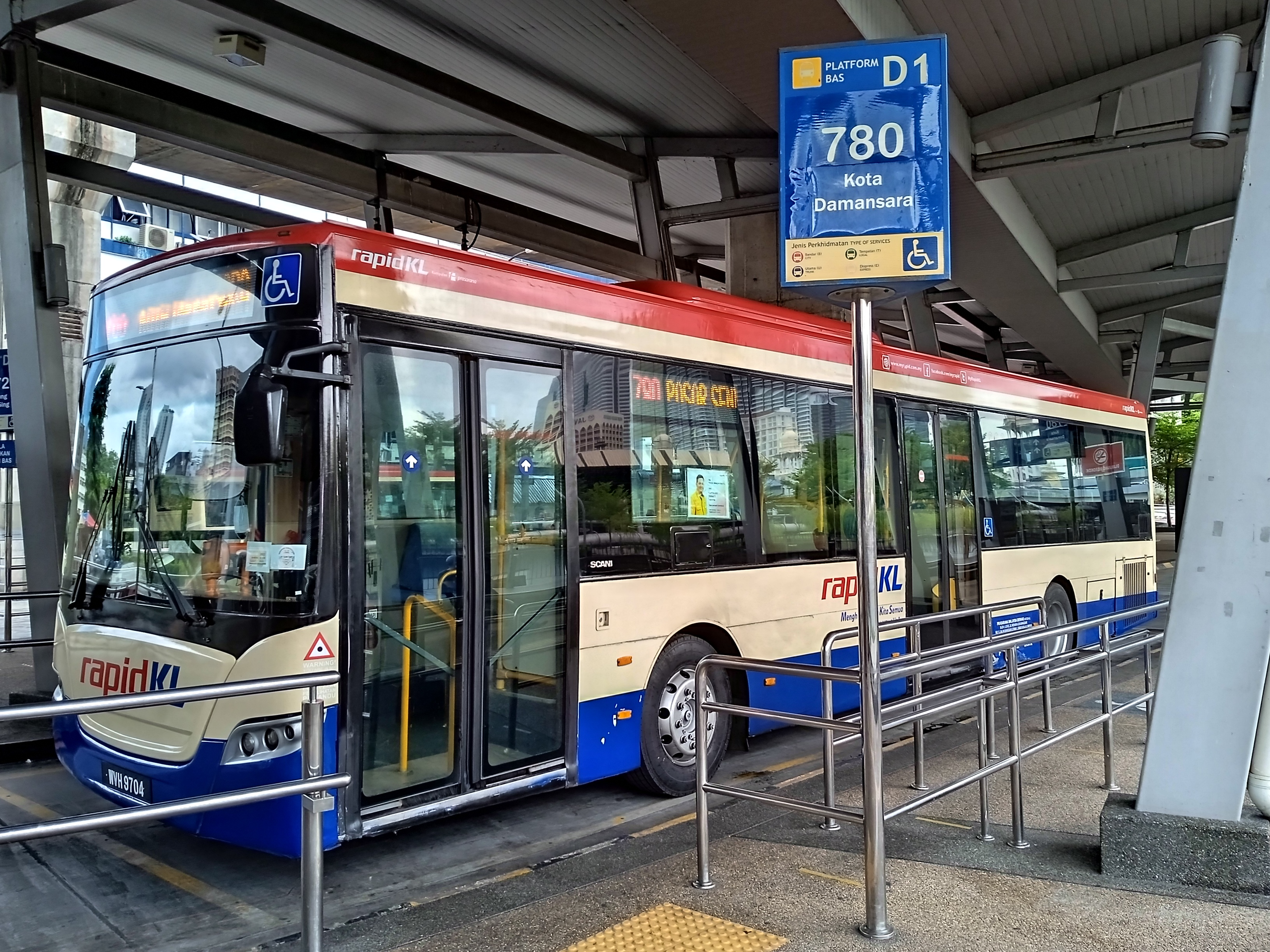
Hab Pasar Seni

- HAB Pasar Seni (Hentian Akhir Bandar), City Bus Terminal
- Central Market
- Dayabumi Complex
- Lee Rubber Building
- Petaling Street (Chinatown)
- Victoria Institution first generation building (1894 - 1929)
- KL Guan Di Temple
- Sin Sze Si Ya Temple

== Gallery ==
=== General ===
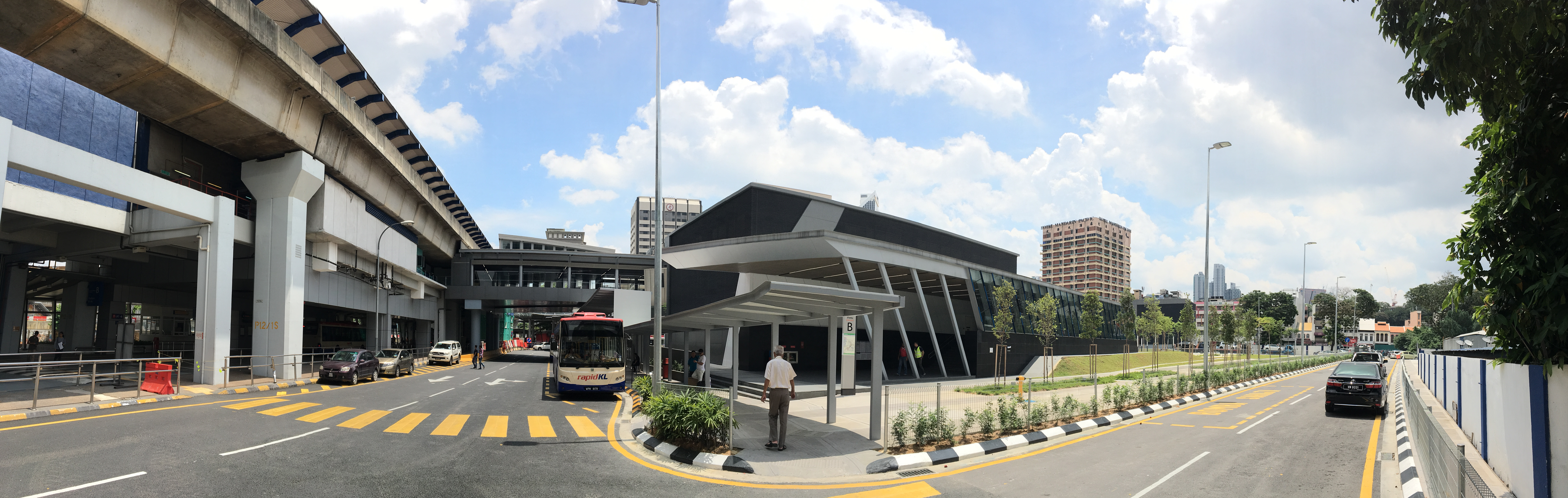
Panoramic view of the Pasar Seni LRT Station on the left, entrance to the MRT station in the middle, and the road to Jalan Tun H.S. Lee at right

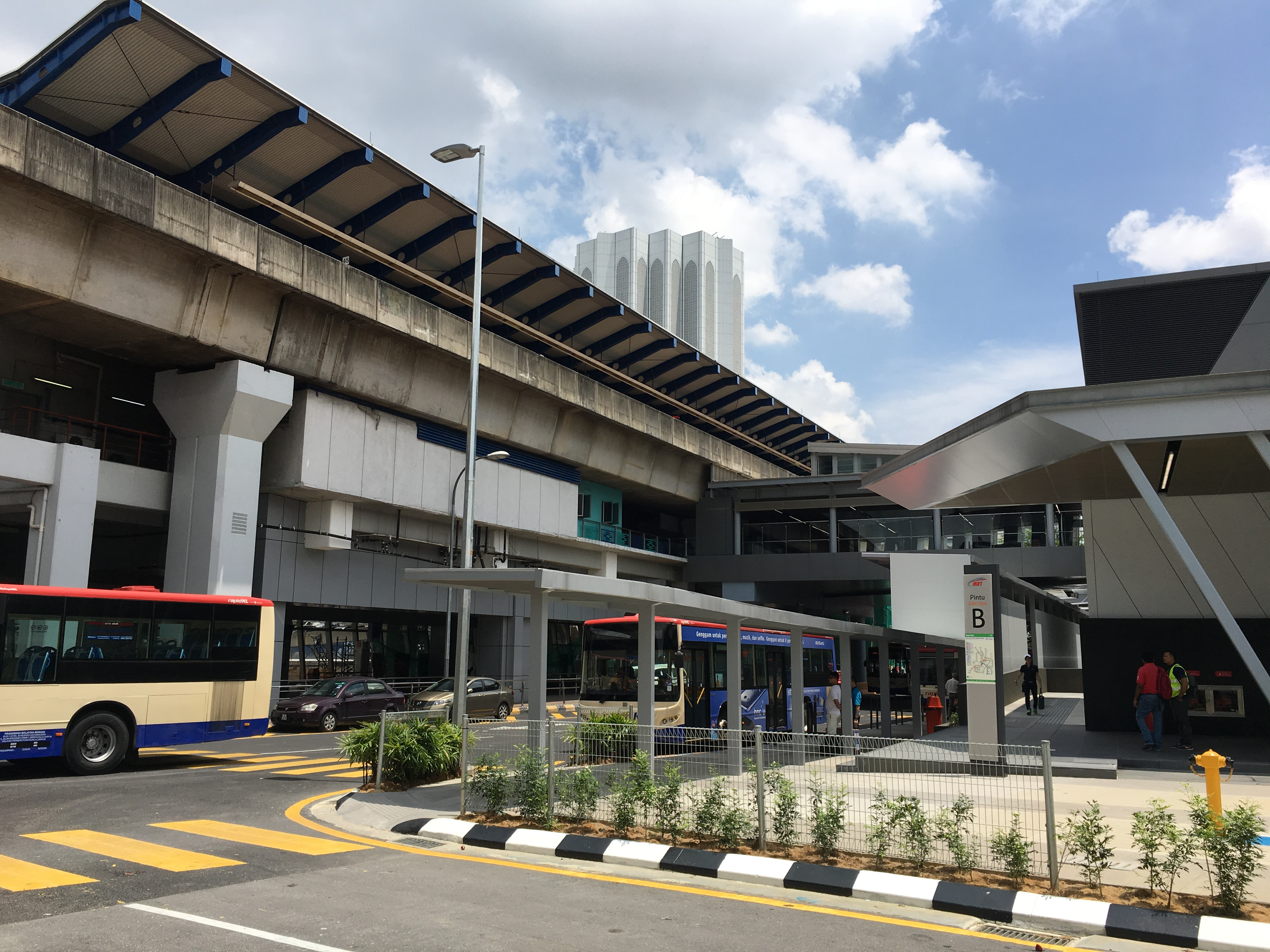
Pasar Seni LRT Station on the left with the entrance to the MRT station on the right

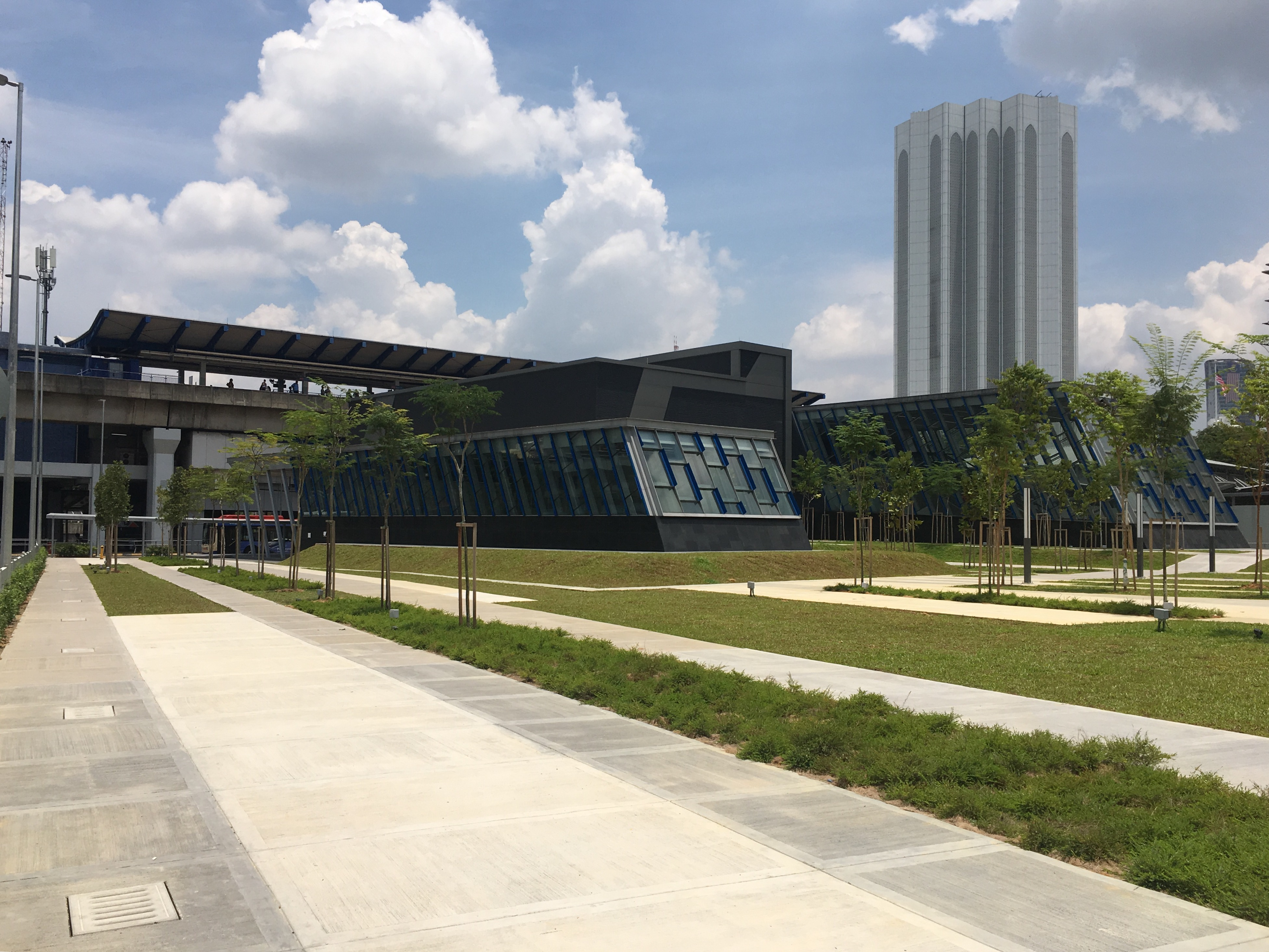
View of the ground level plaza of the Pasar Seni MRT station with the glass entrances and the Pasar Seni LRT Station at the back

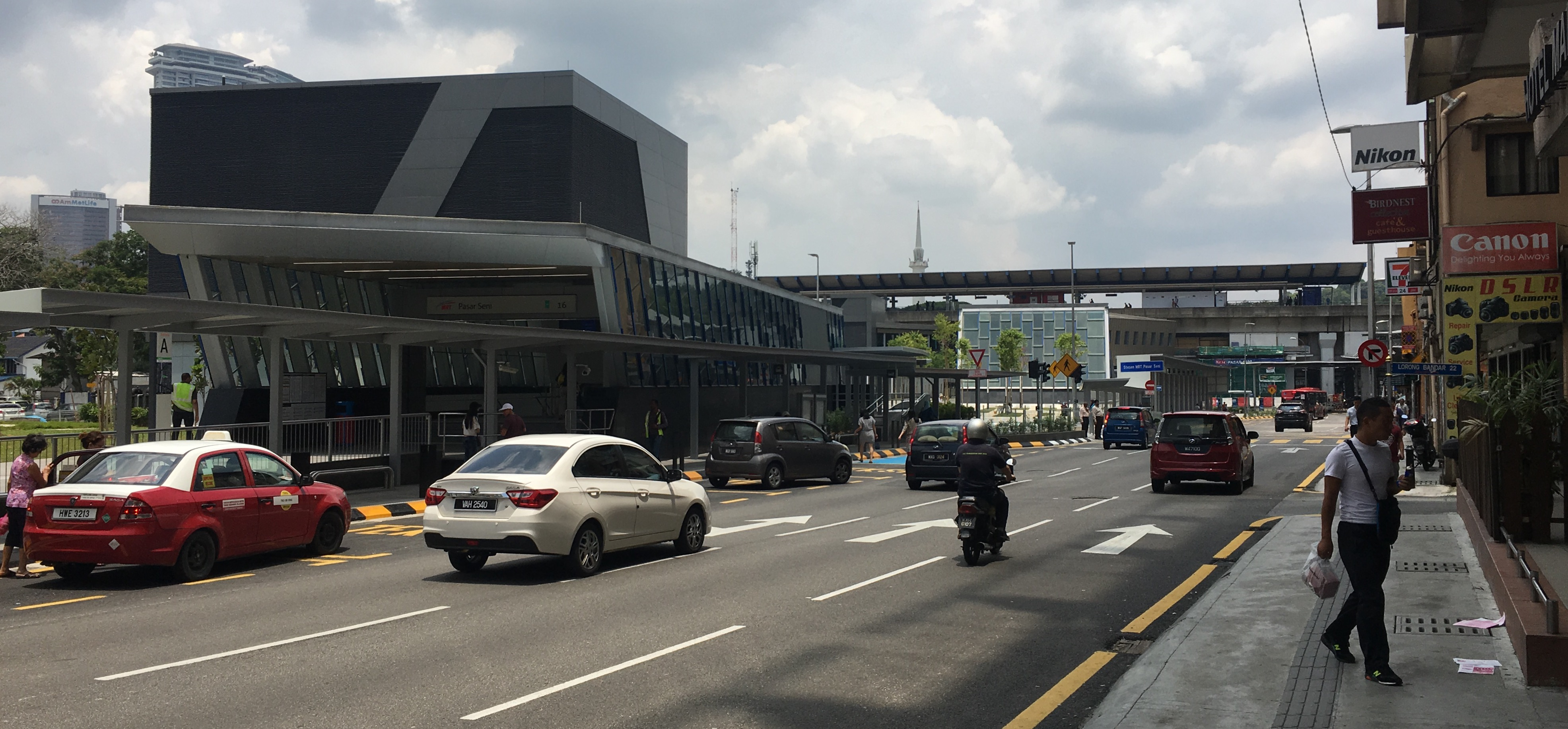
Pasar Seni MRT Station entrances (left) and the LRT station (back) along Jalan Sultan

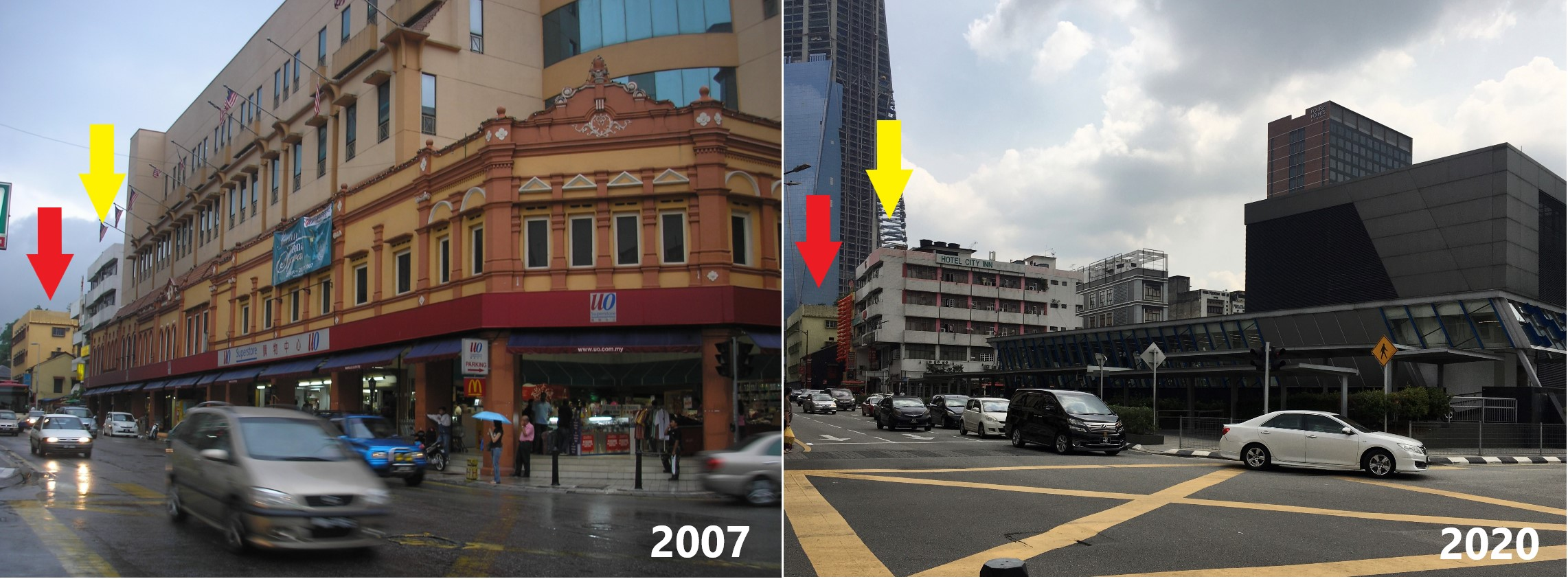
Combination of pictures showing the current Pasar Seni MRT station Entrance A in 2020 (right) and the same site in 2007 (left) where the former Uda Ocean Shopping Centre was located

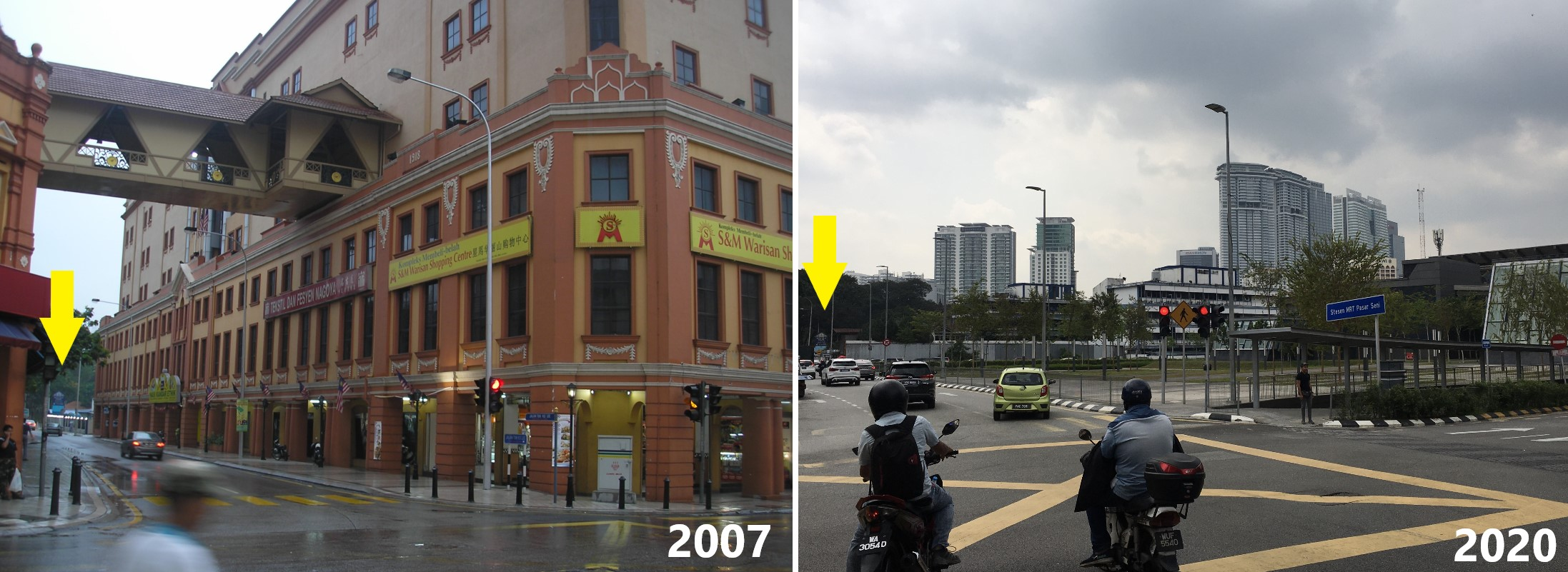
Another combination of pictures showing the current LRT-MRT stations link in 2020 (right), where the former Plaza Warisan building was located in 2007 (left)

=== LRT station ===
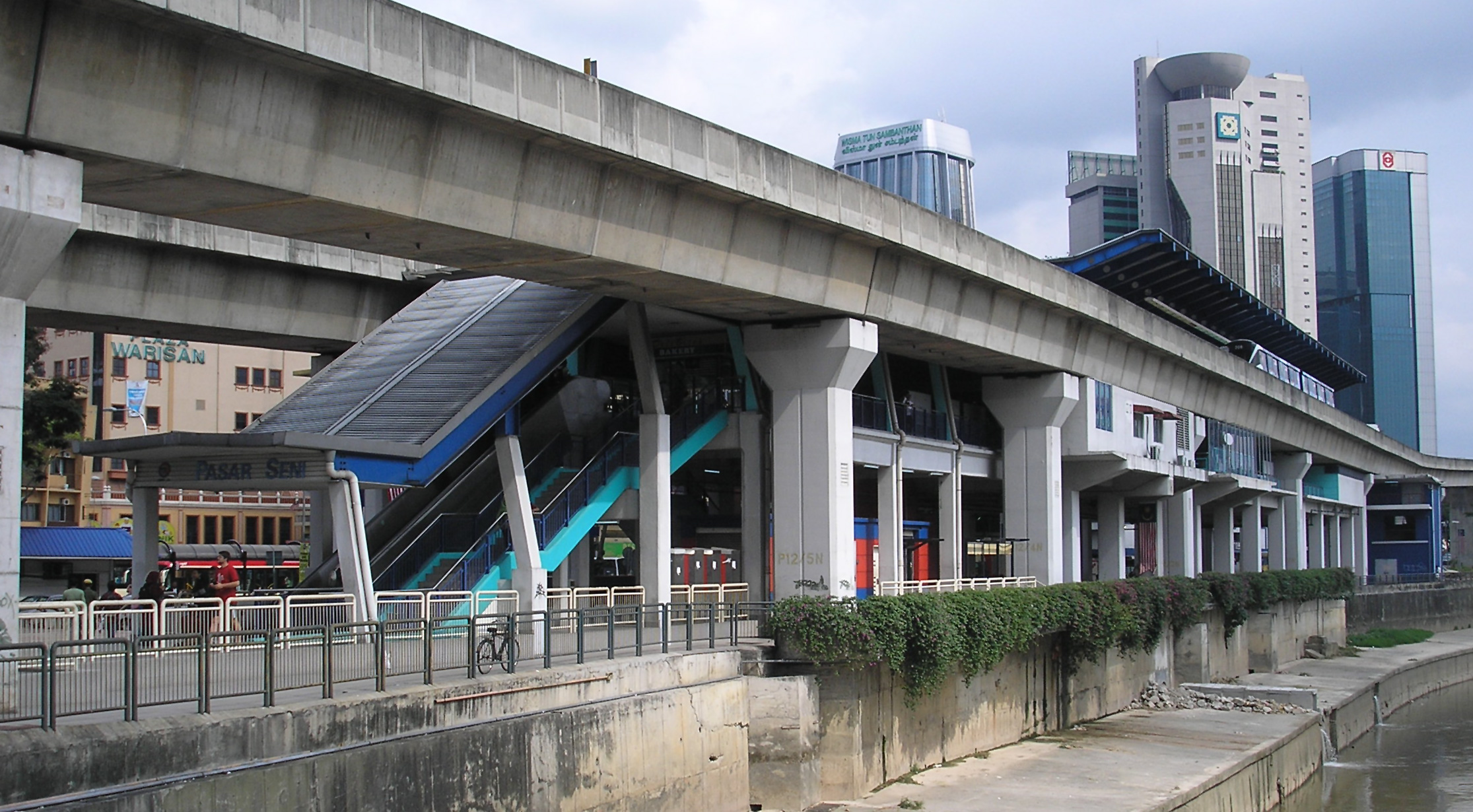
Exterior of the Pasar Seni LRT station

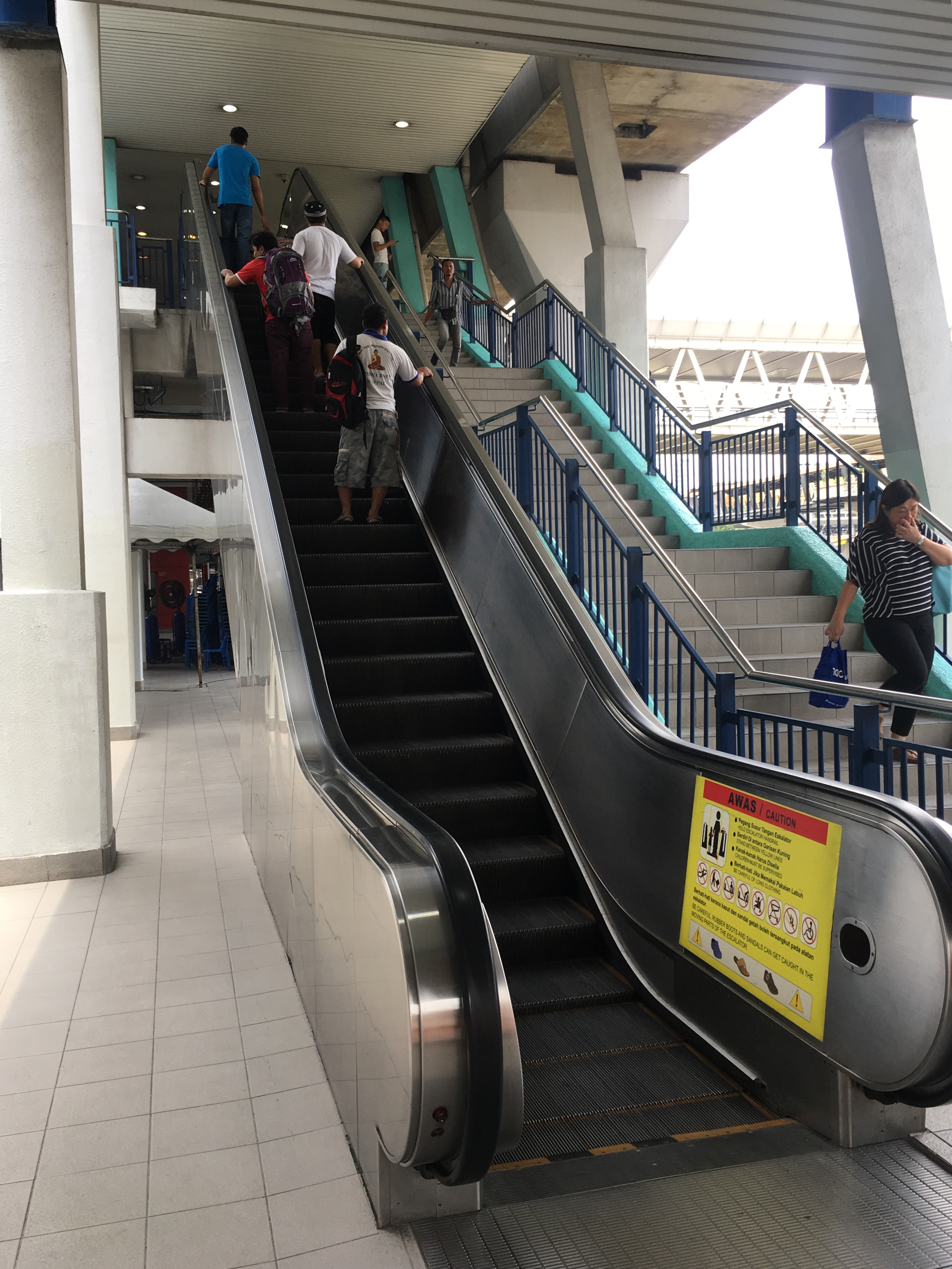
Escalators from Jalan Tun Tan Cheng Lock leading to the entrance of the station

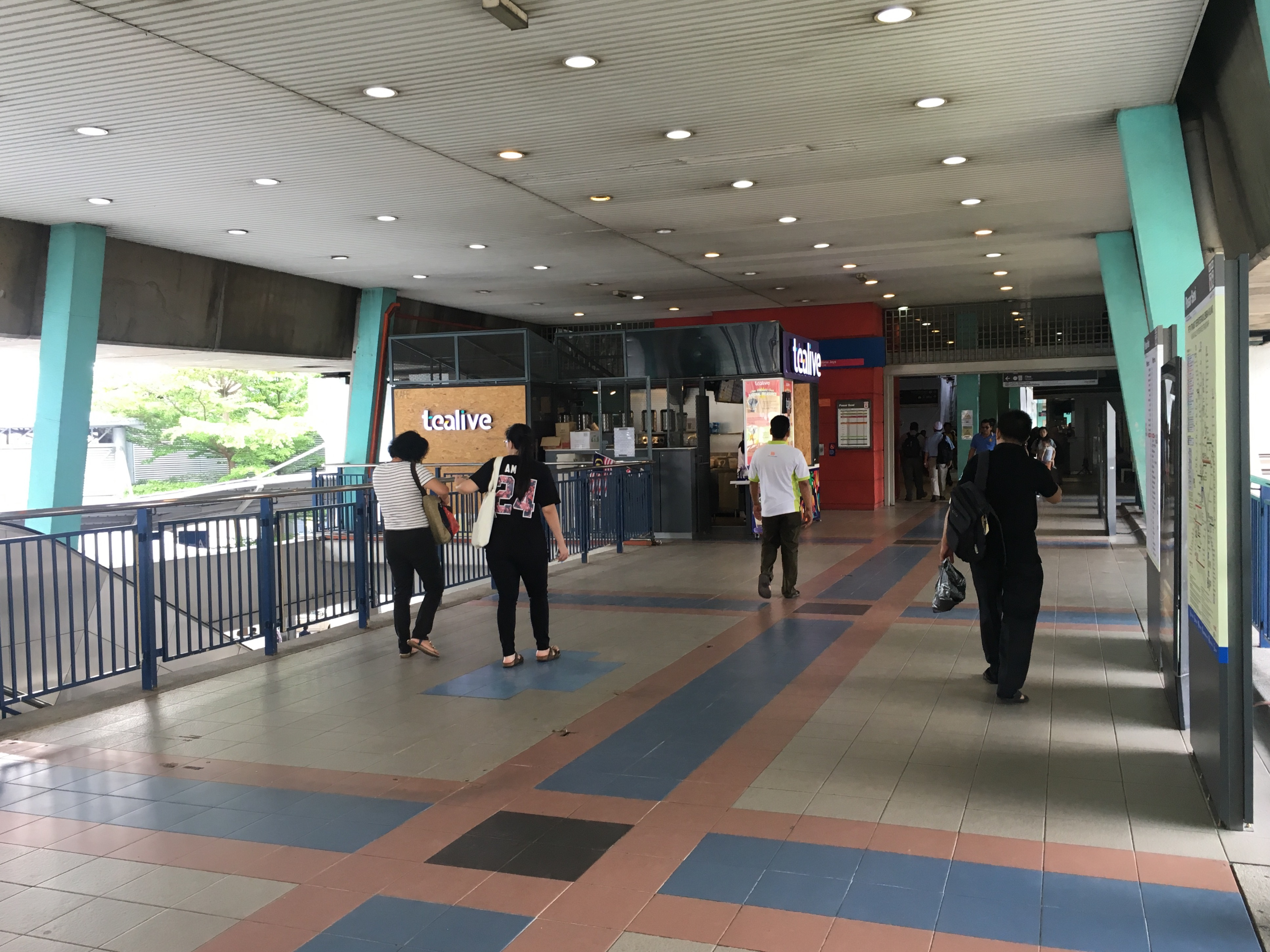
Area leading to the station entrance

Entrance into the station concourse area

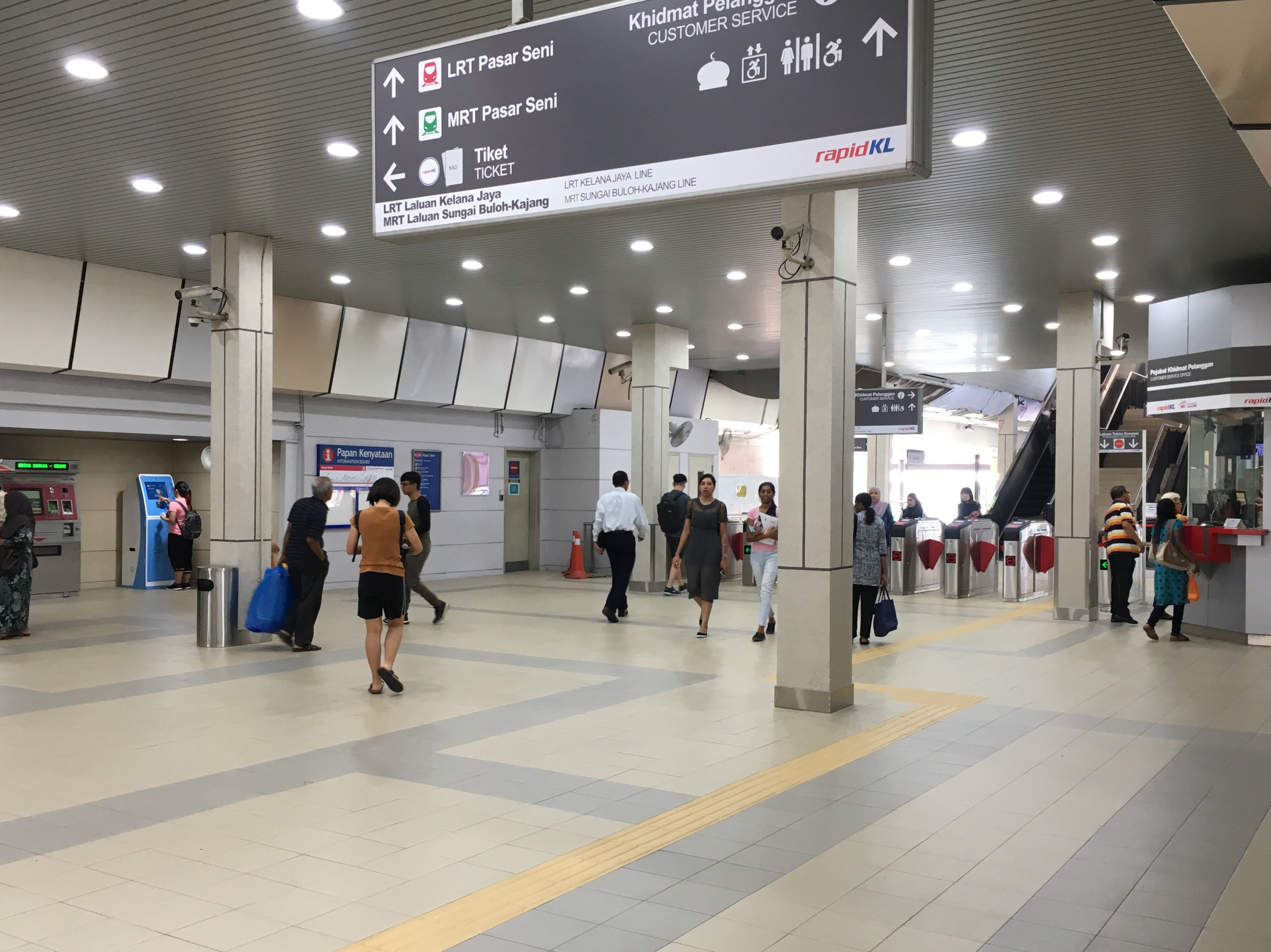
Unpaid area of the concourse level of the LRT station where the ticket vending machines are located, after refurbishment in 2018

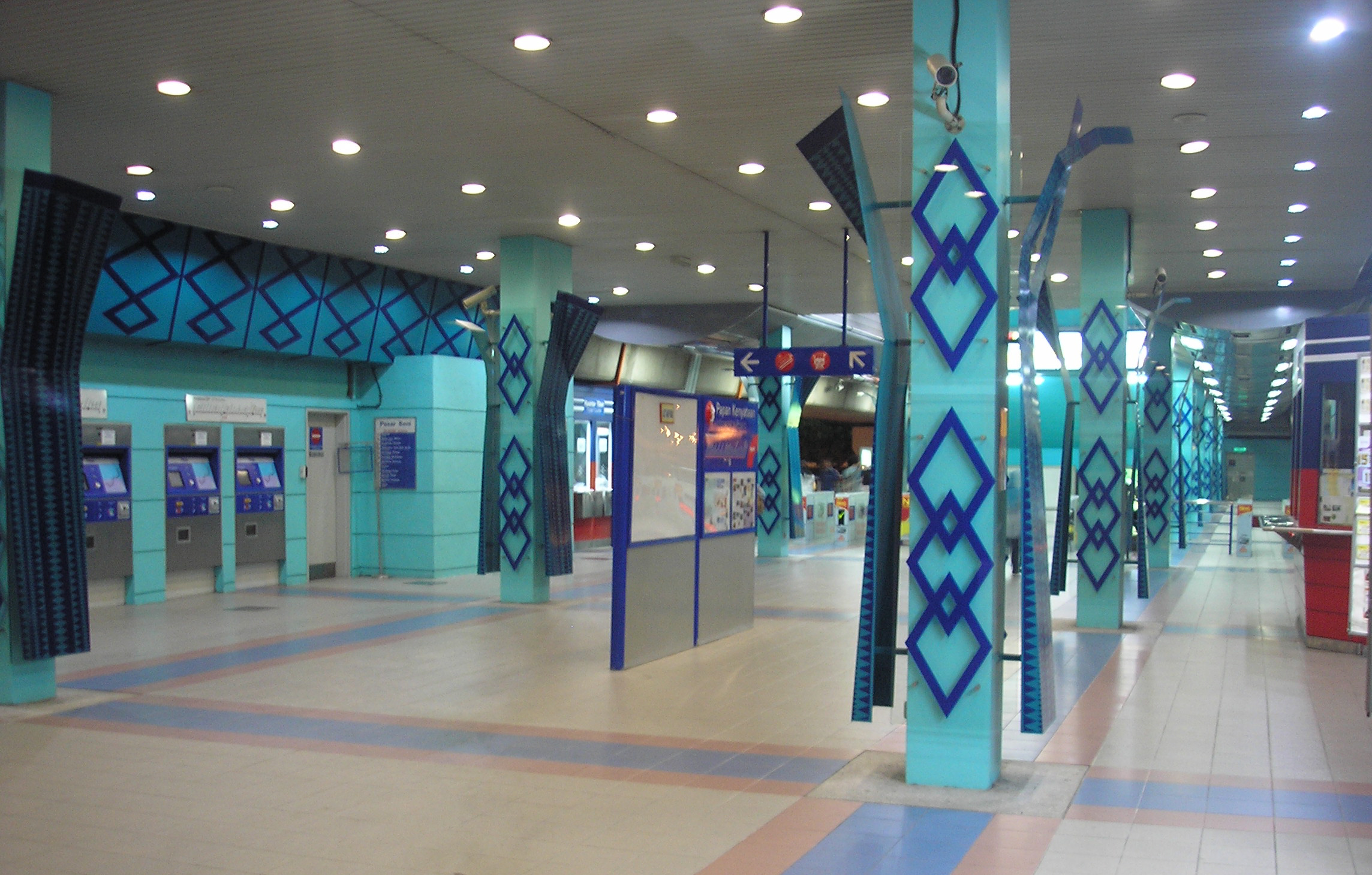
View of the concourse of the LRT station in 2007. The LRT station was originally designed in a blue, Malay architecture theme to reflect the nearby Central Market's vibe.

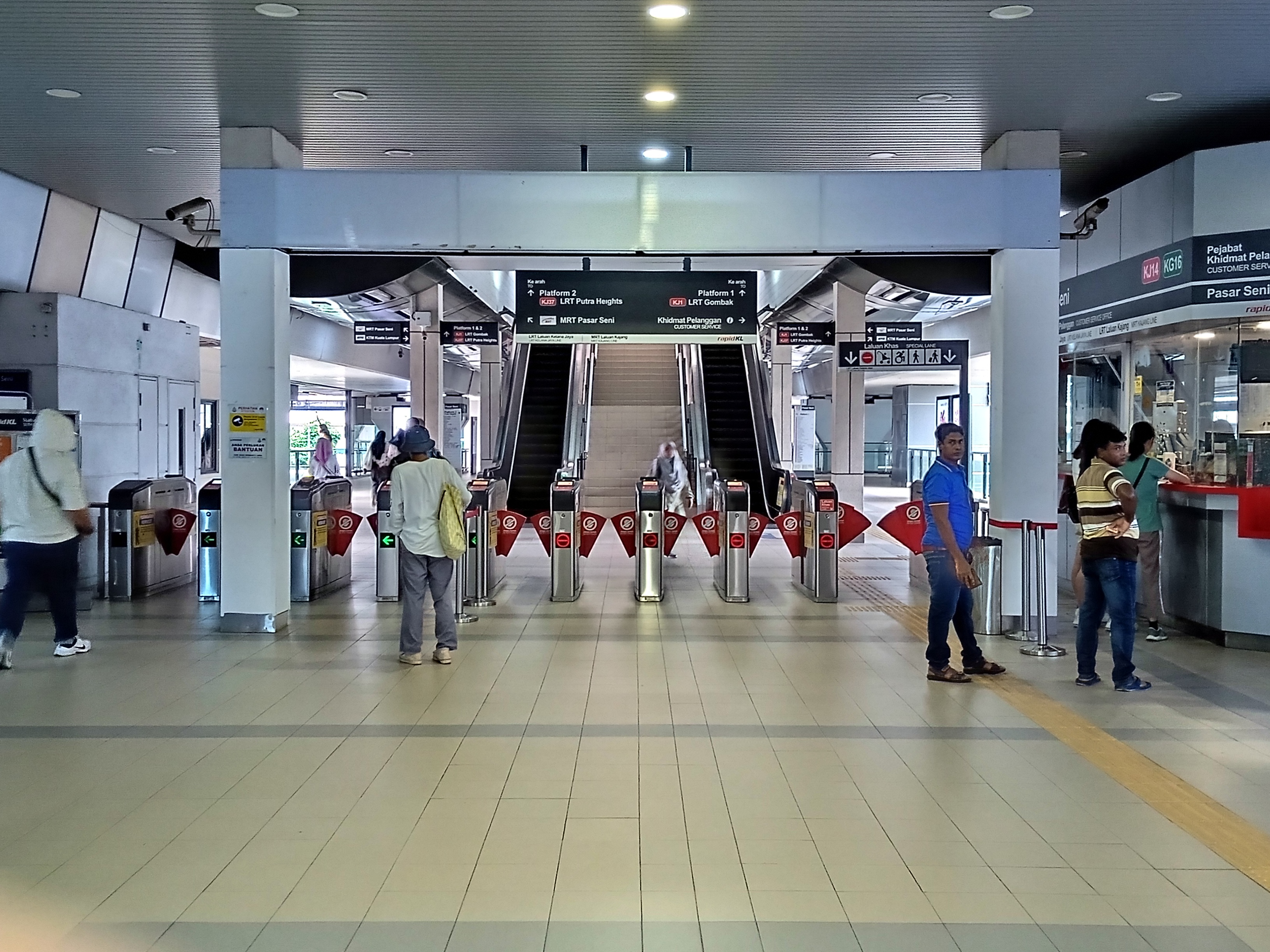
Fare gates at the LRT station concourse level

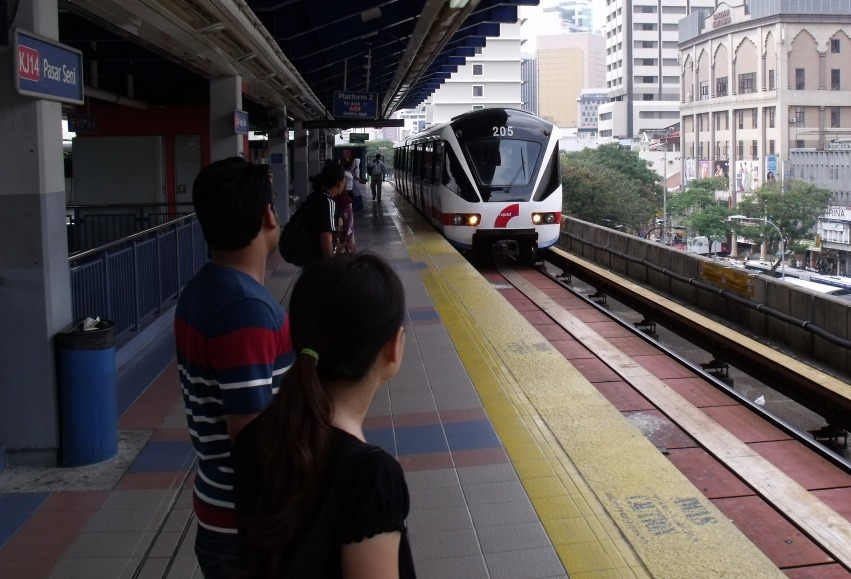
The train arriving at Pasar Seni LRT platform

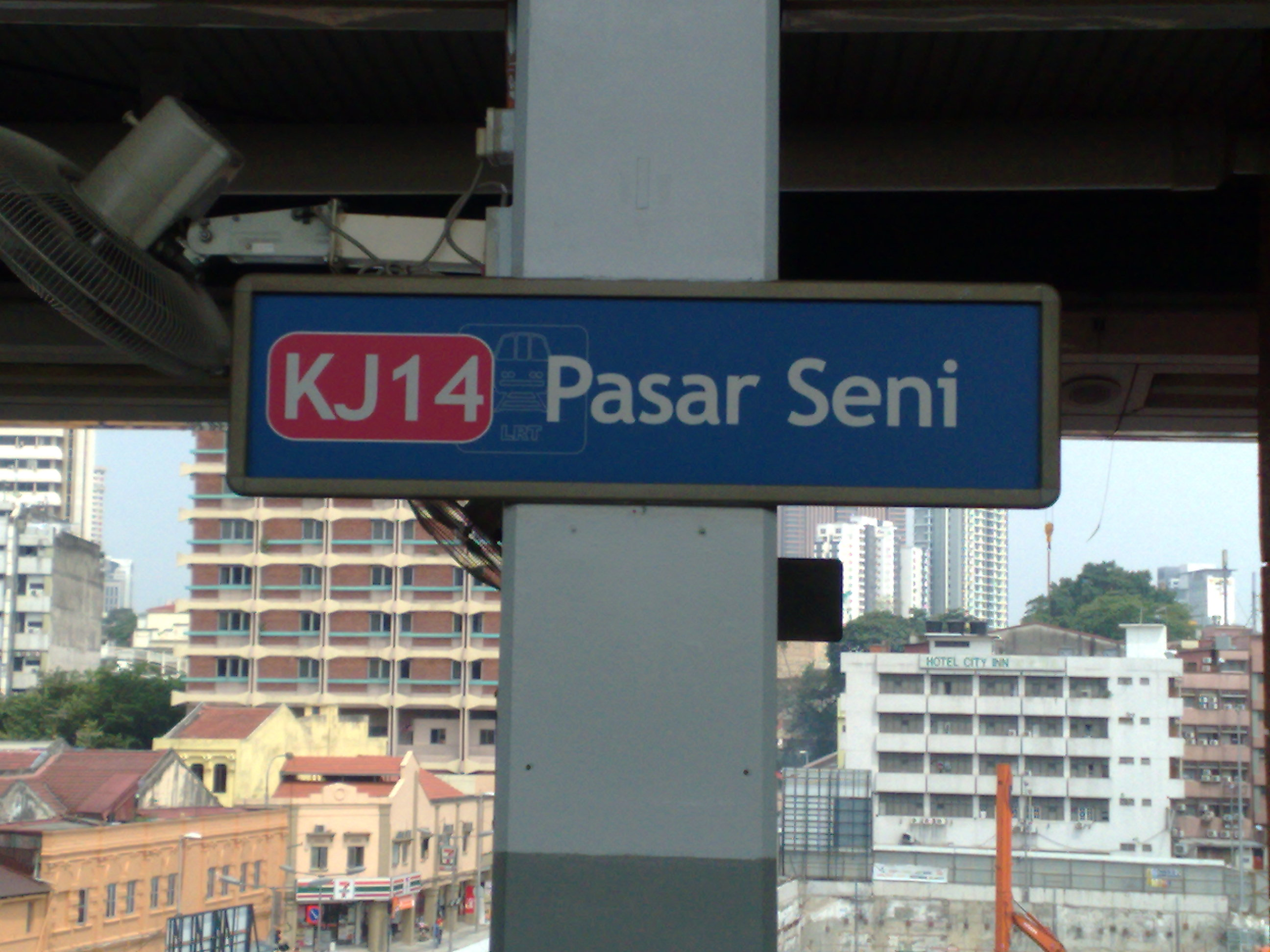
The Pasar Seni LRT signboard

=== MRT station ===
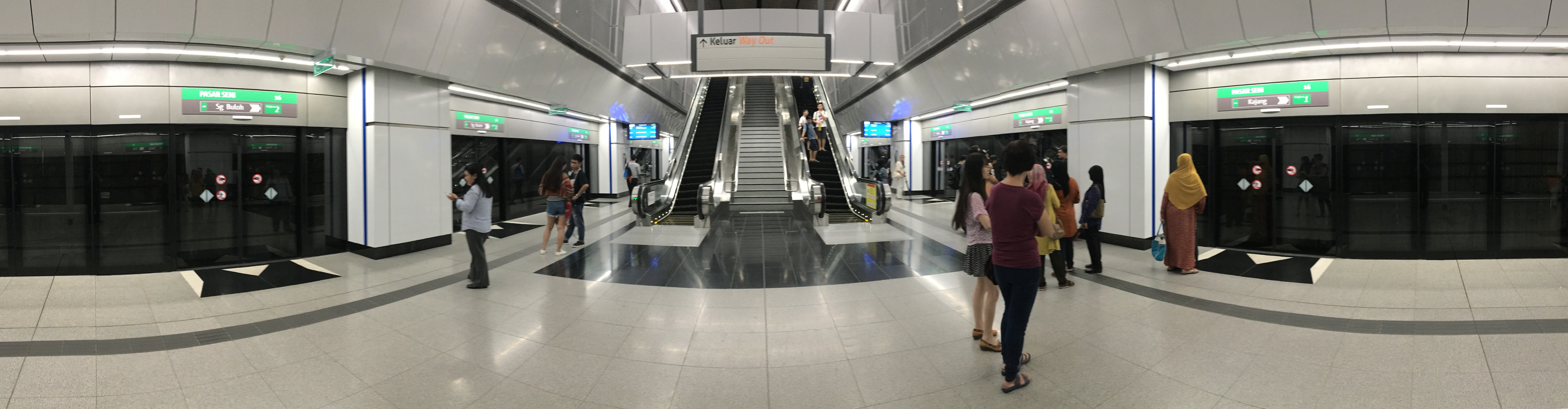
Panoramic shot of the platform level of the station

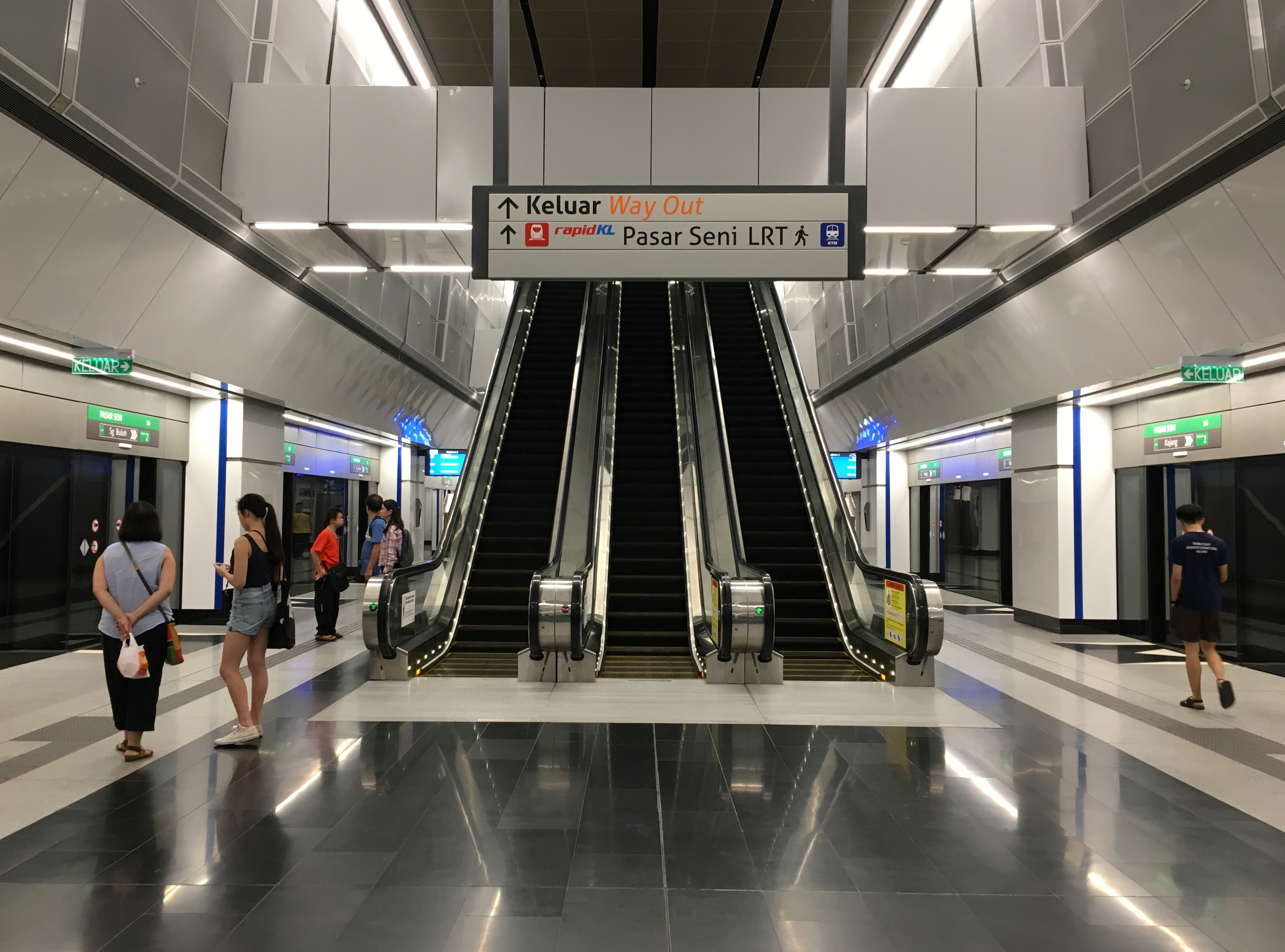
Platform level of the station

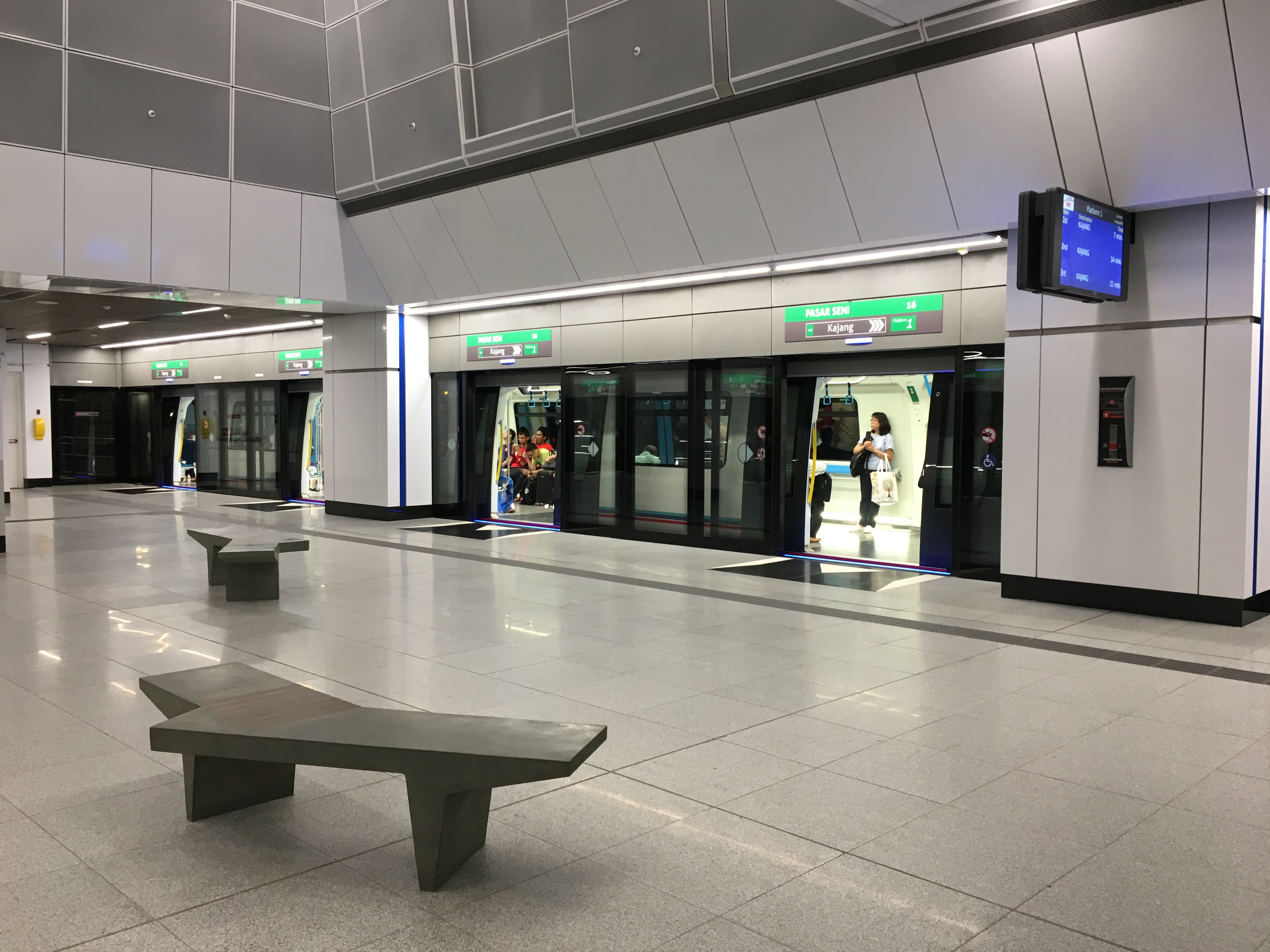
Platform level of the station showing the bench designed by Chan Lee Kang which was selected during a bench design competition

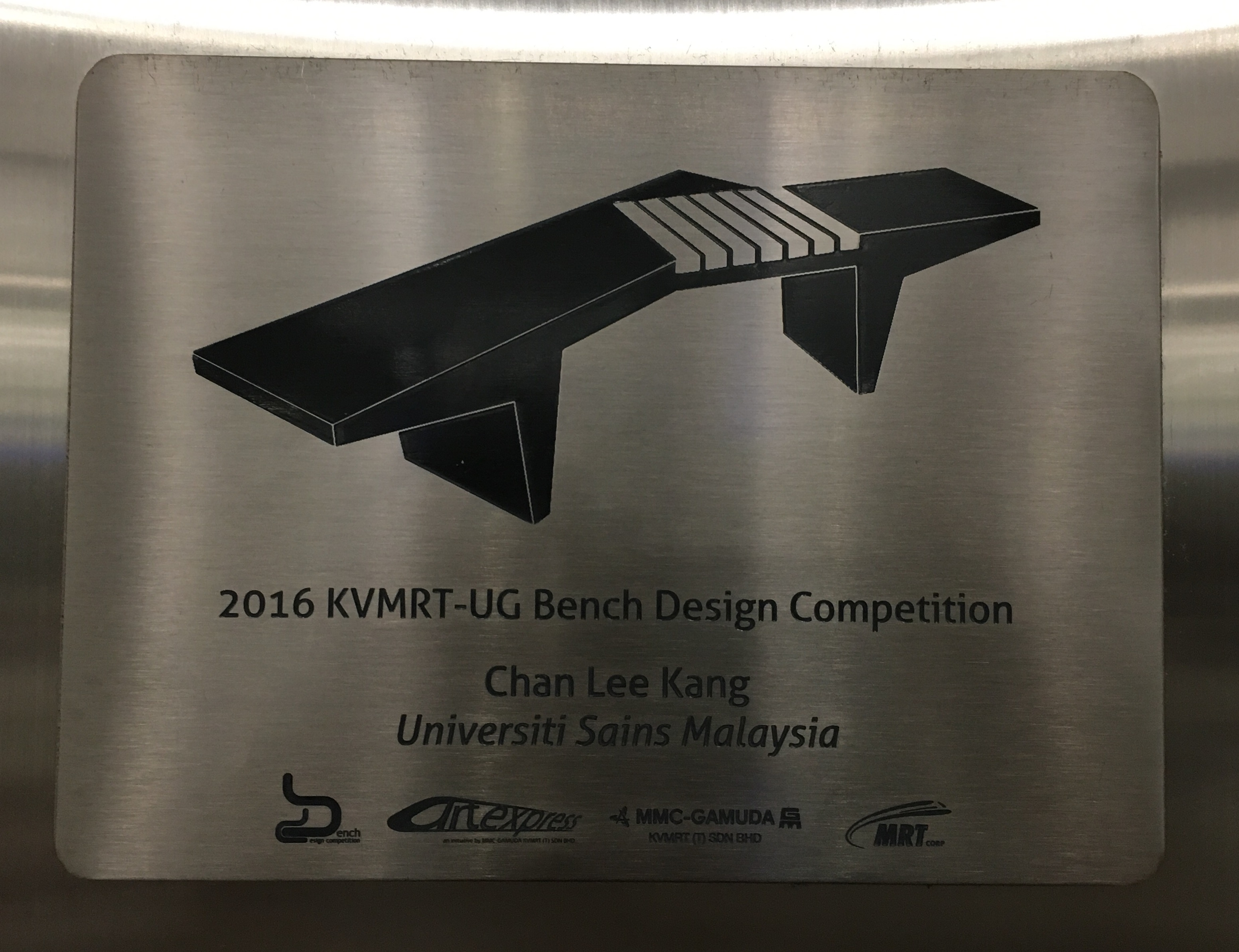
Plaque at the platform level of the station recognising Chan Lee Kang as the designer of the station bench

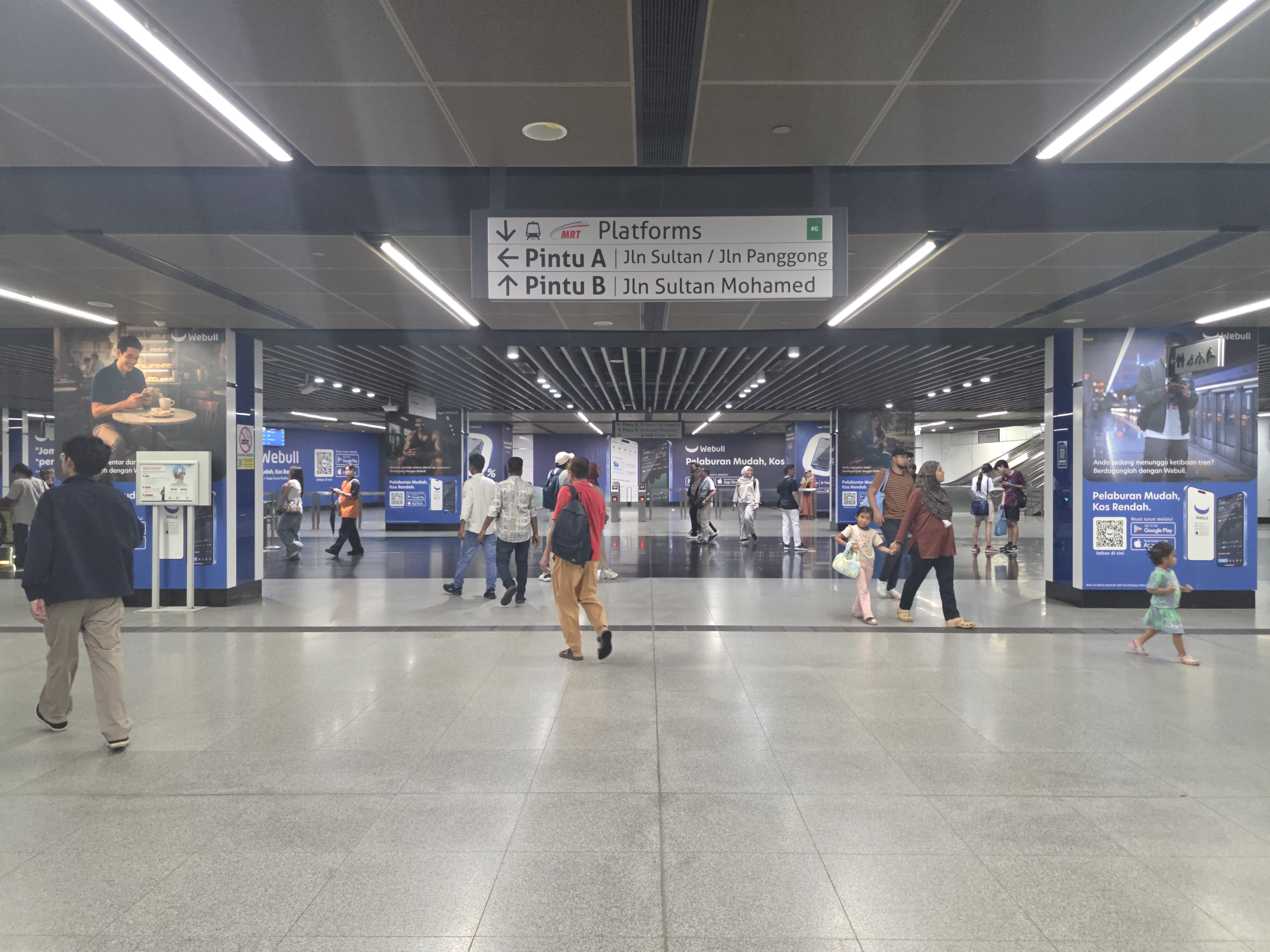
Concourse level of the station

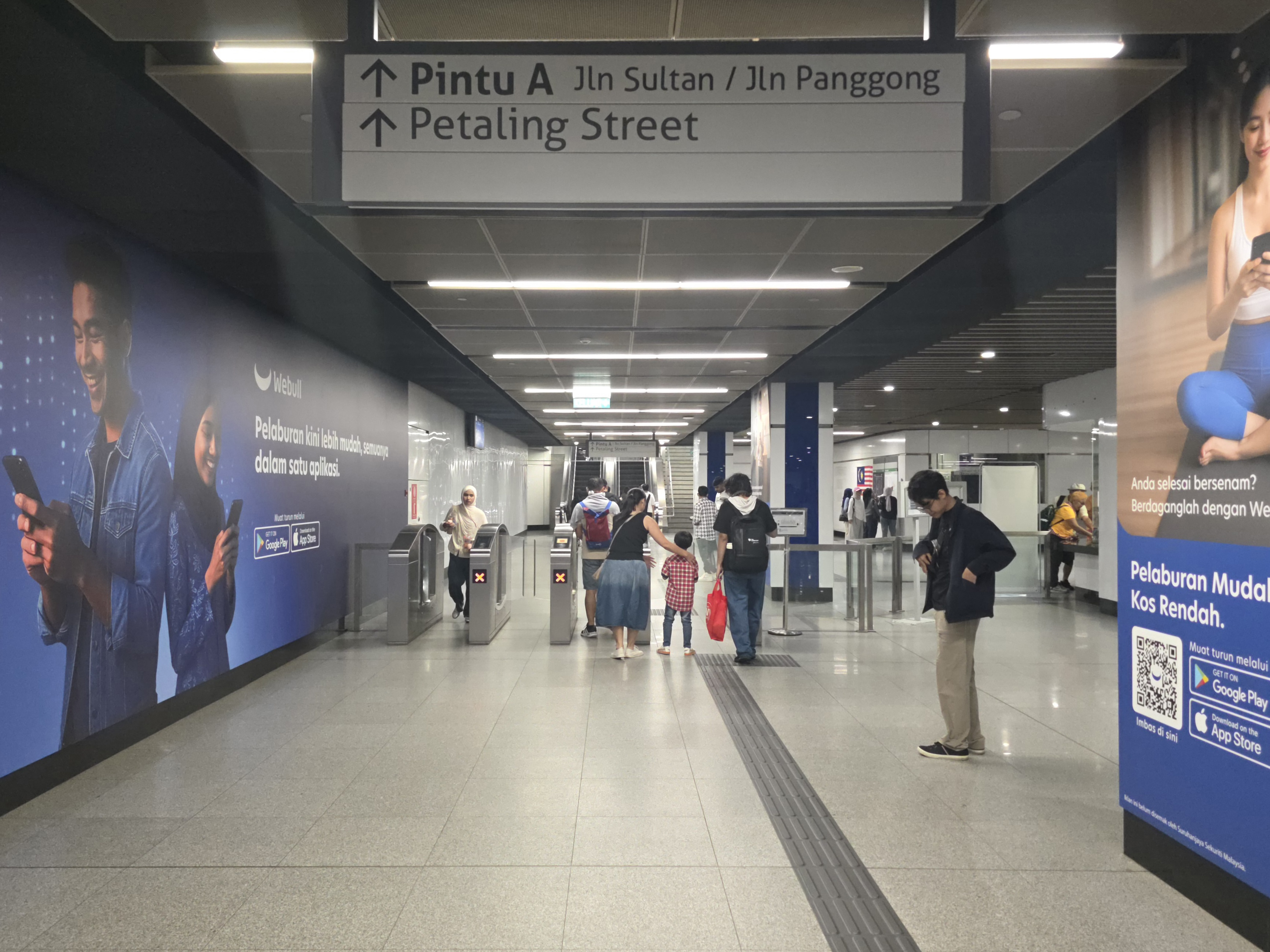
Fare gates leading out to Entrance A of the MRT station

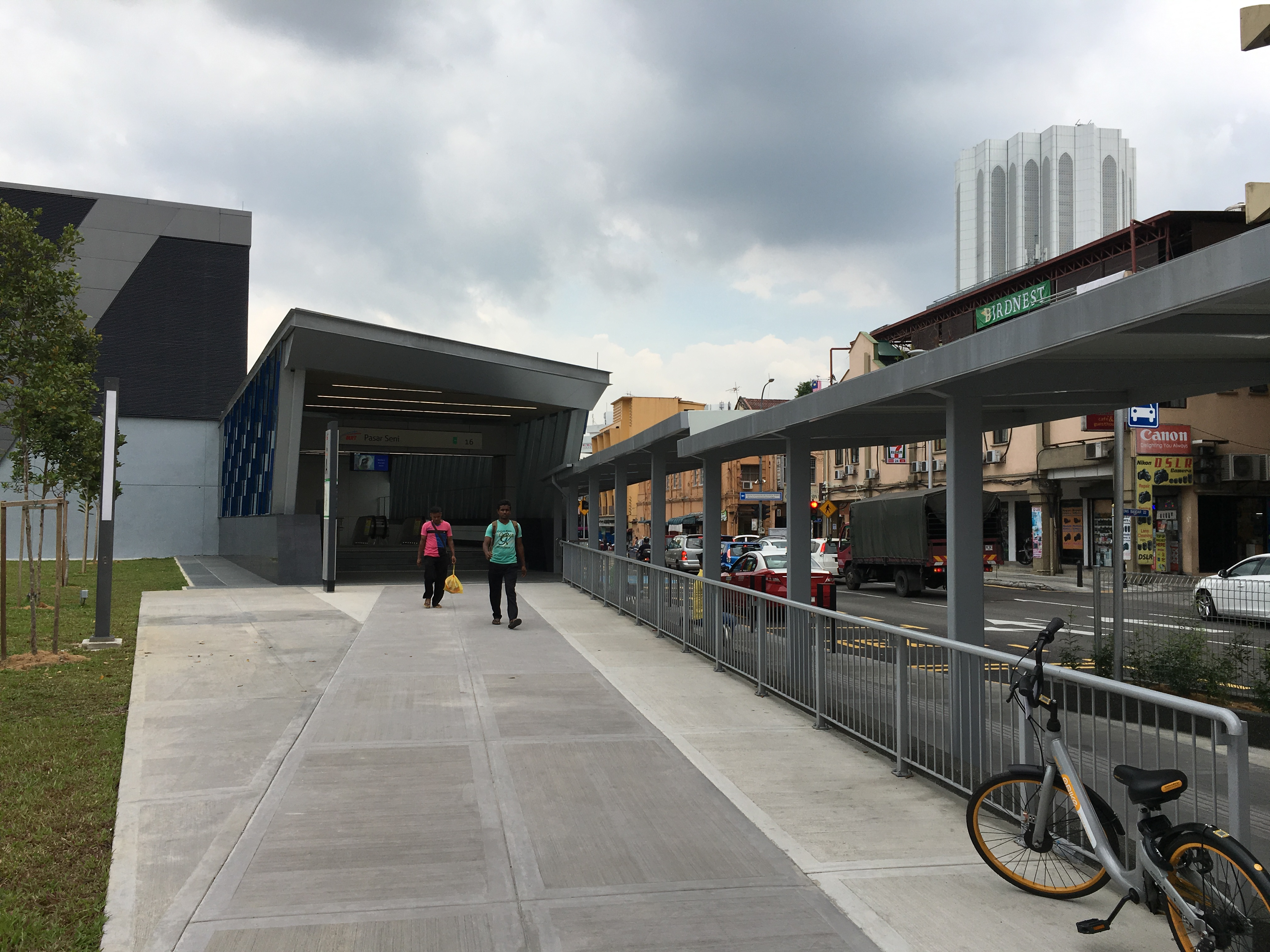
Entrance A of the station at Jalan Sultan

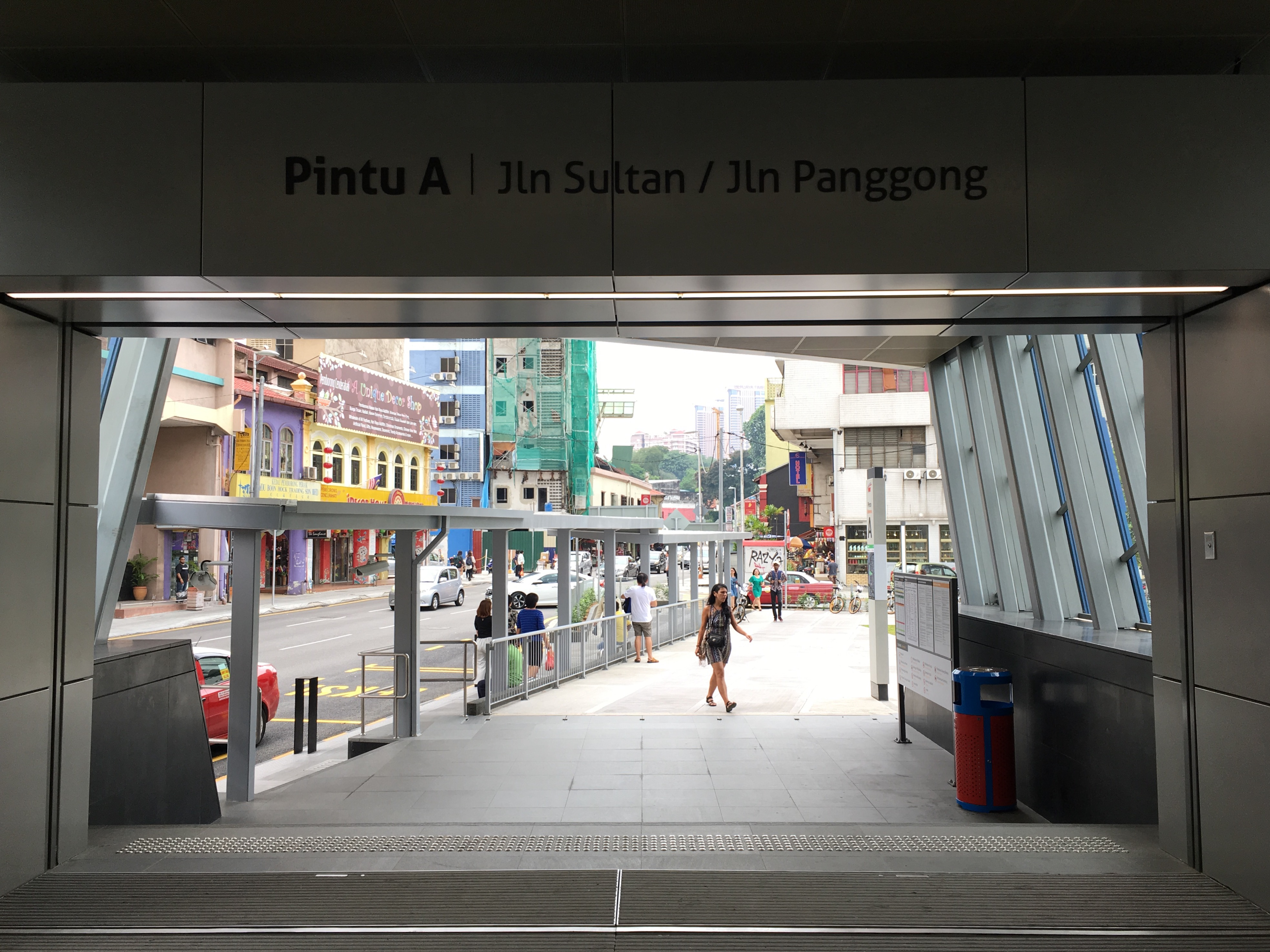
View of Jalan Sultan from Entrance A

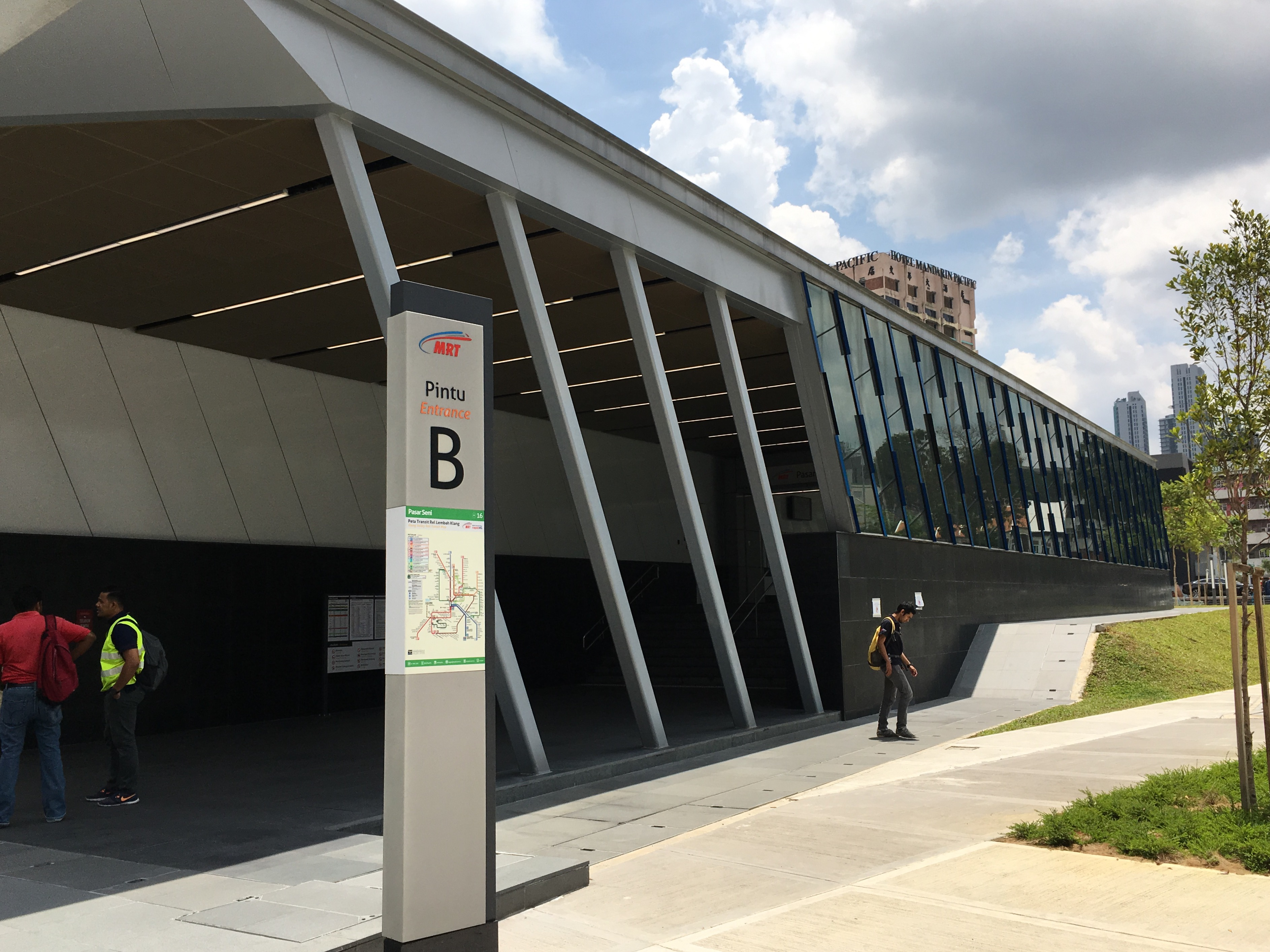
Entrance B of the station at Jalan Sultan Mohamed

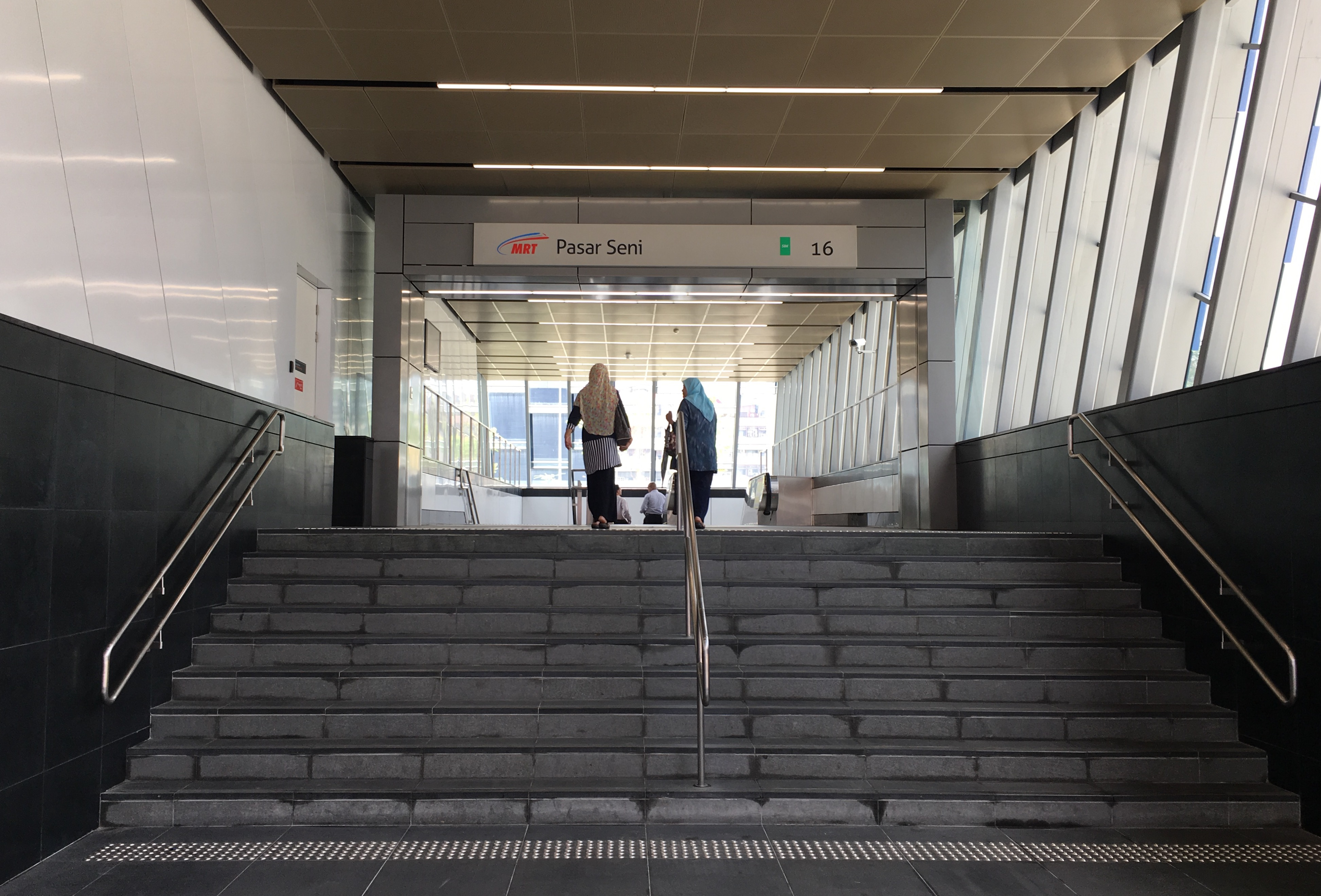
Close up view of Entrance B

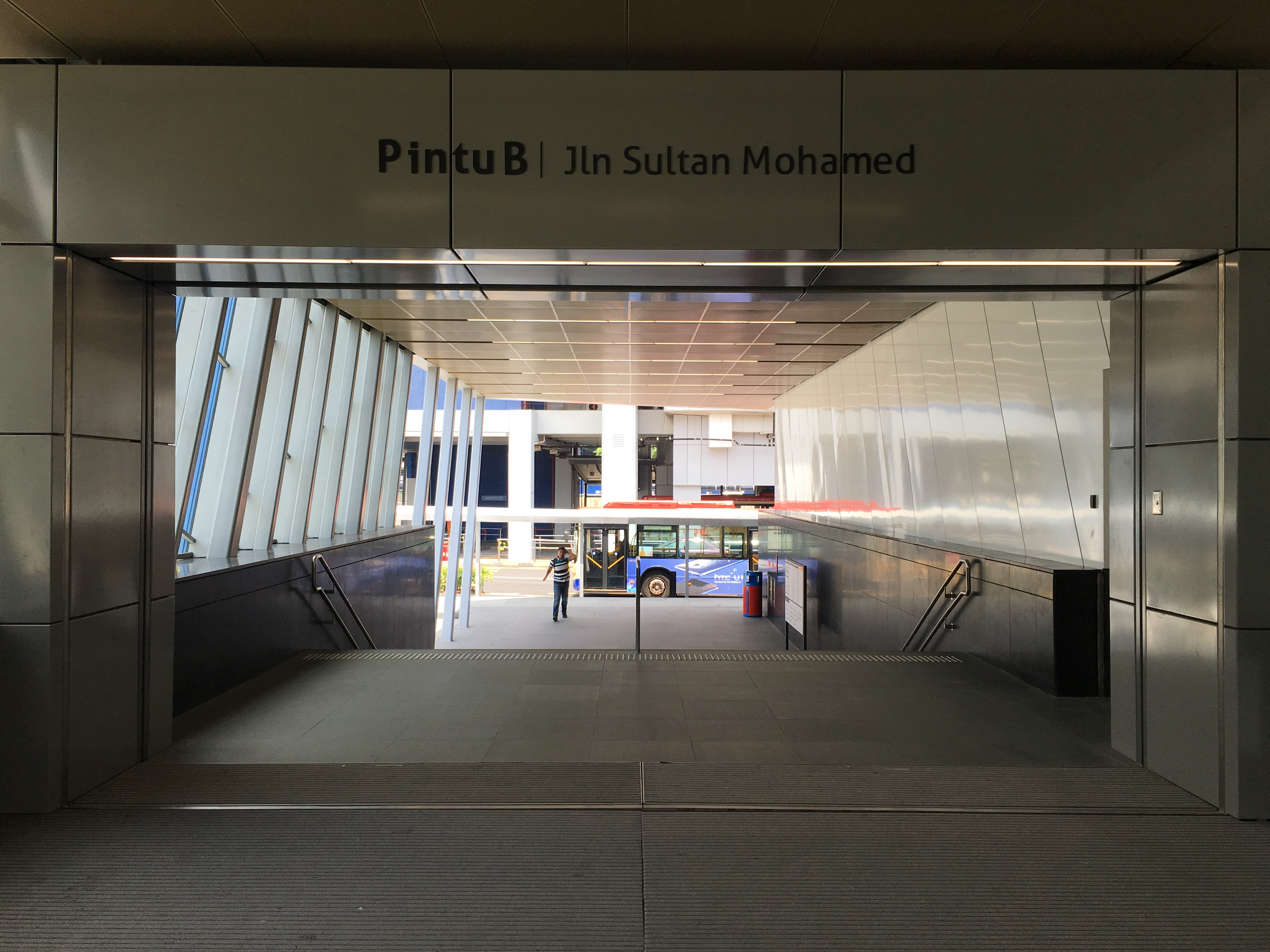
Looking out of Entrance B

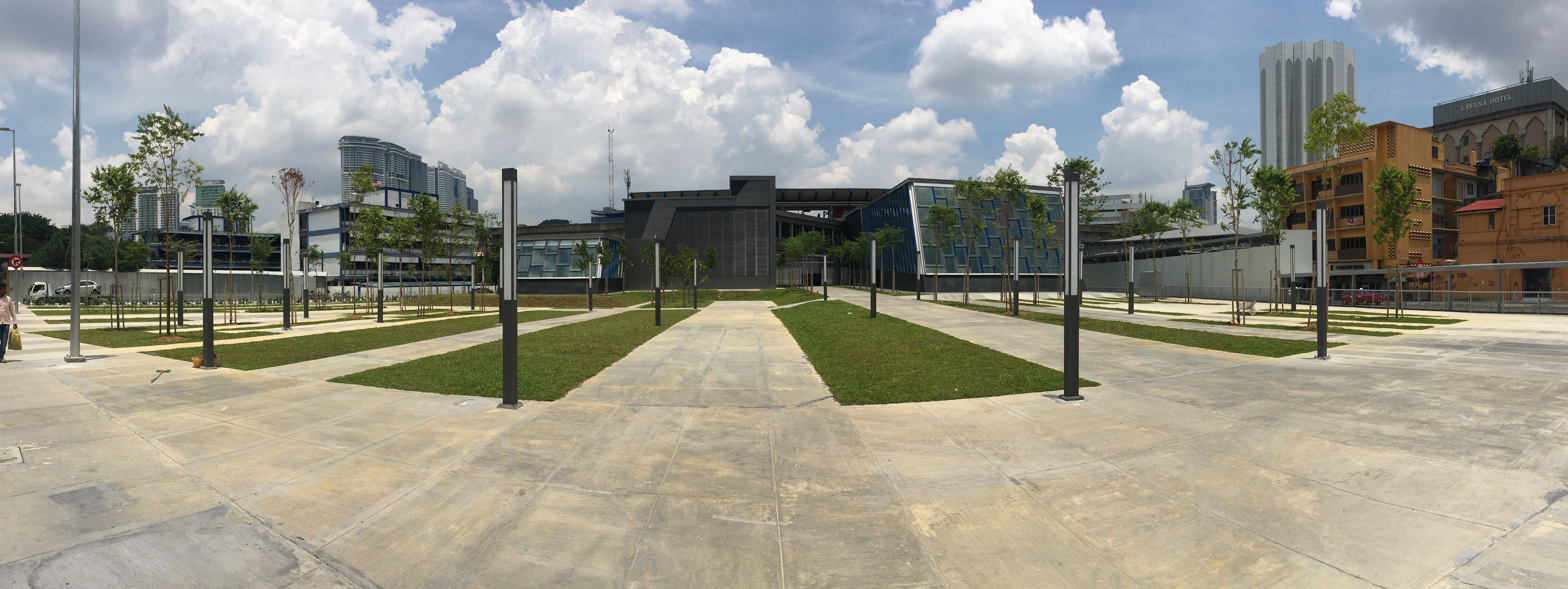
Ground level plaza of the Pasar Seni MRT Station

=== LRT-MRT link ===
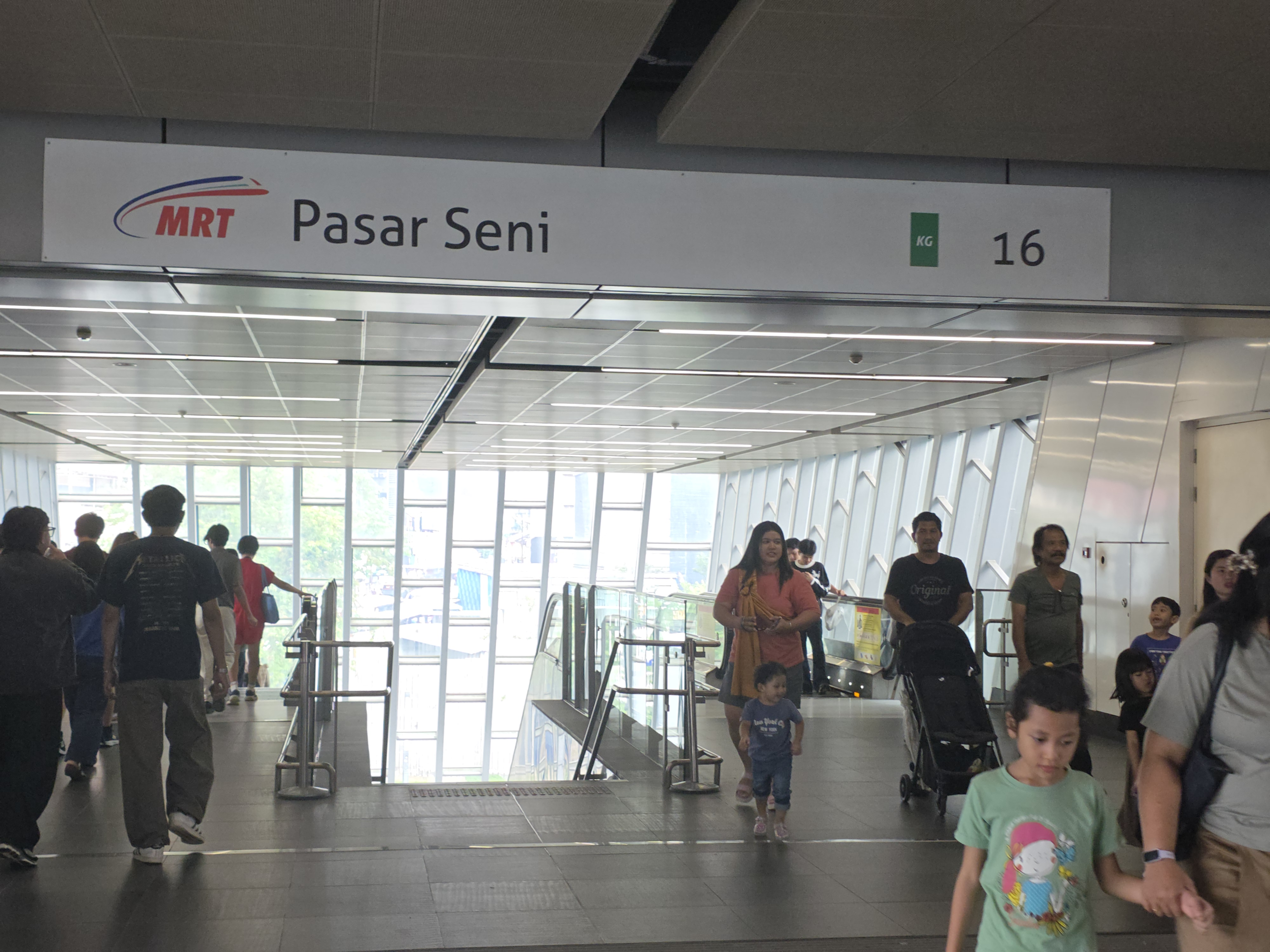
View of the pedestrian link bridge from the LRT concourse

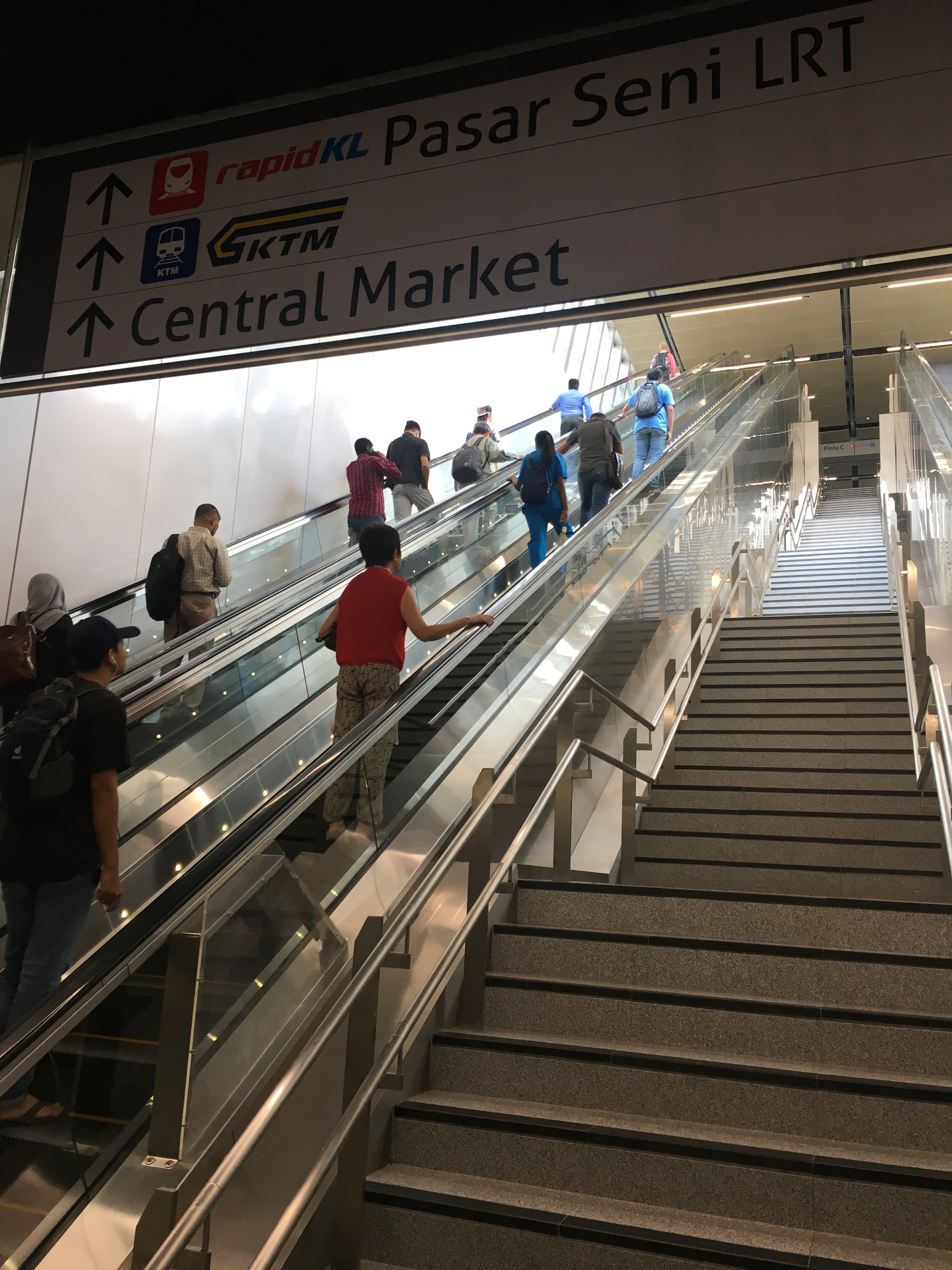
Escalators from the MRT station concourse level to the pedestrian link bridge

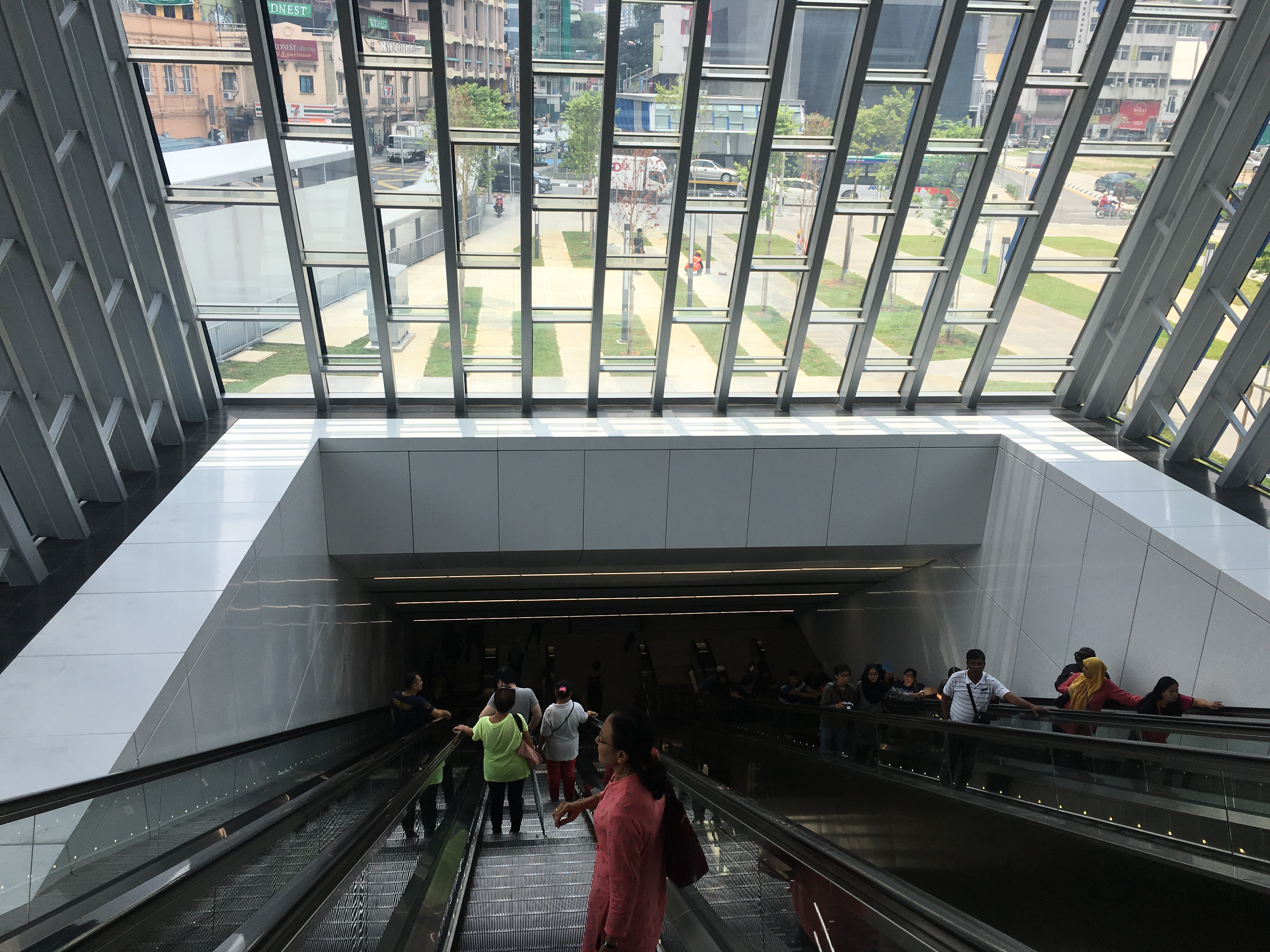
Escalators going down to the MRT station concourse level from the pedestrian link bridge

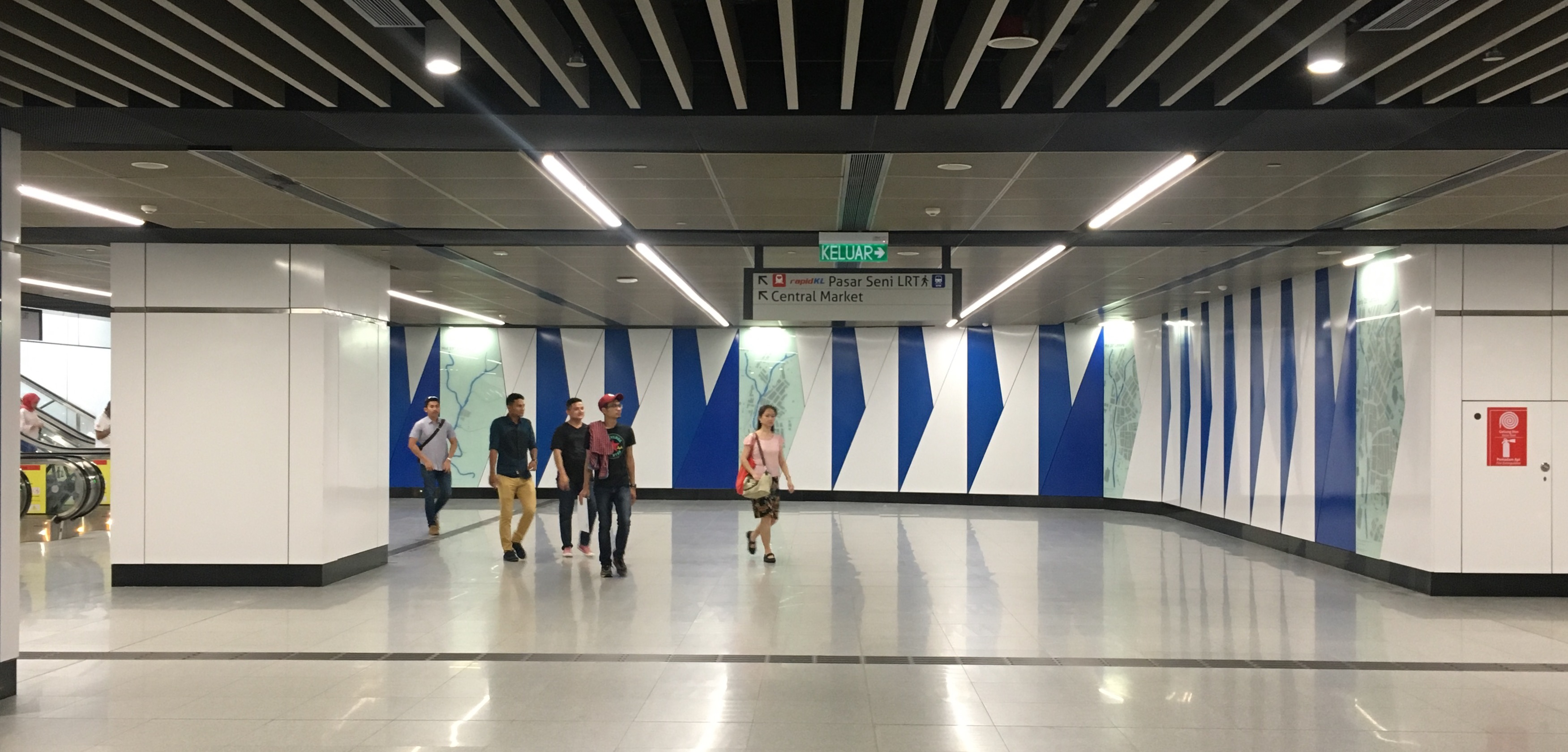
MRT station concourse level area towards the escalators to the pedestrian link bridge

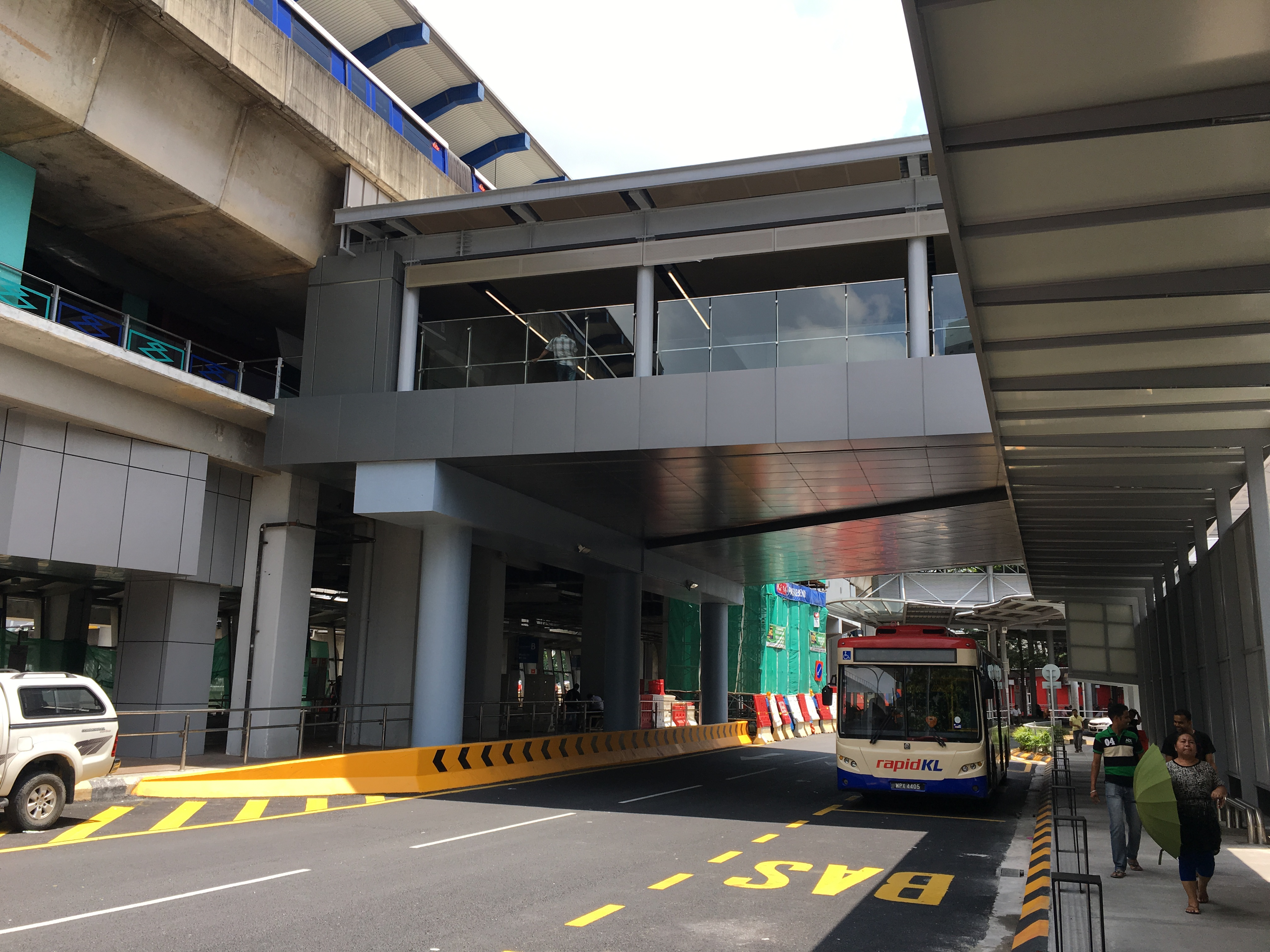
External view of the pedestrian link bridge over Jalan Sultan Mohamed, with the LRT station at left and MRT station at right

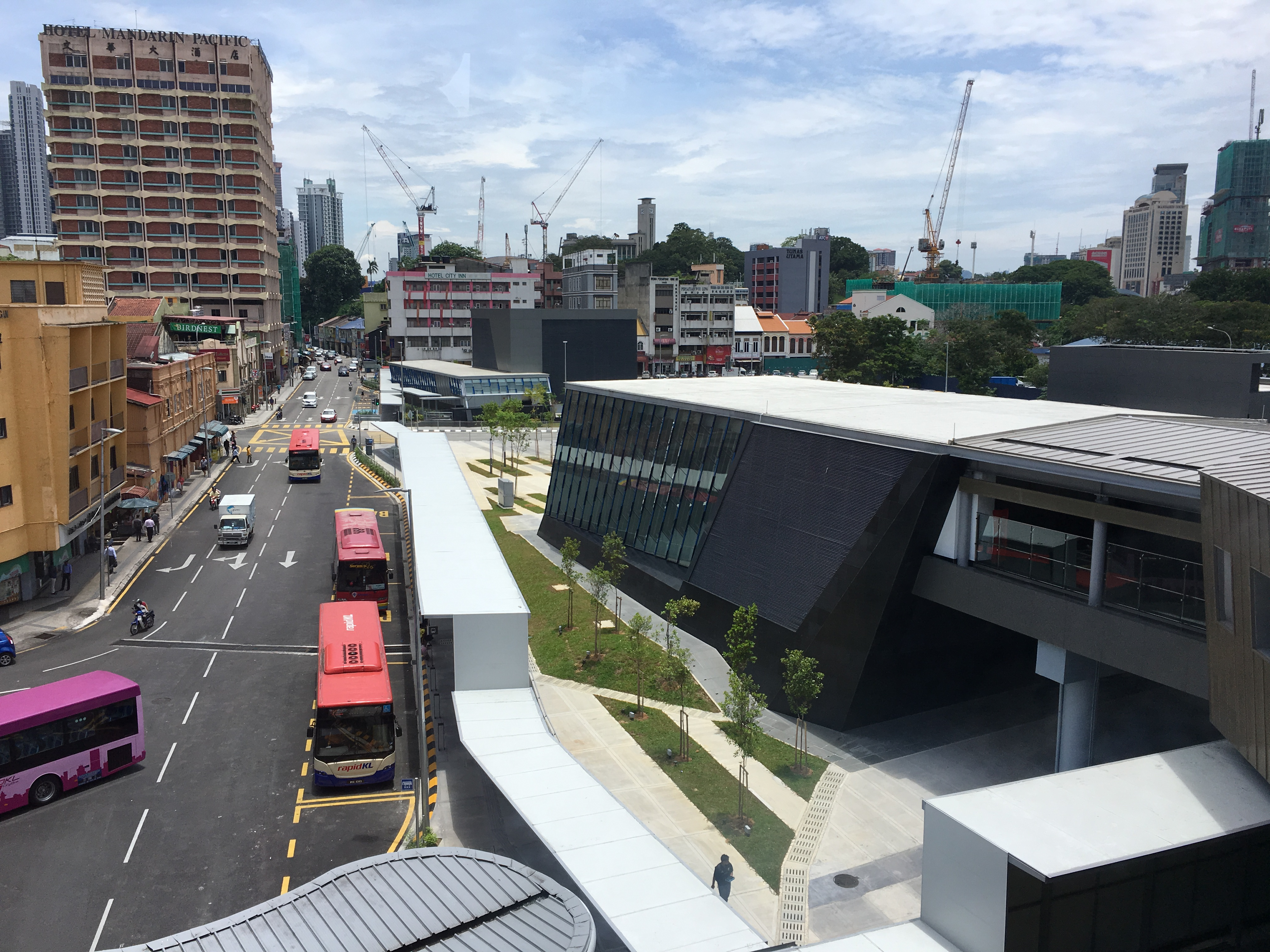
View of the link bridge from the LRT station

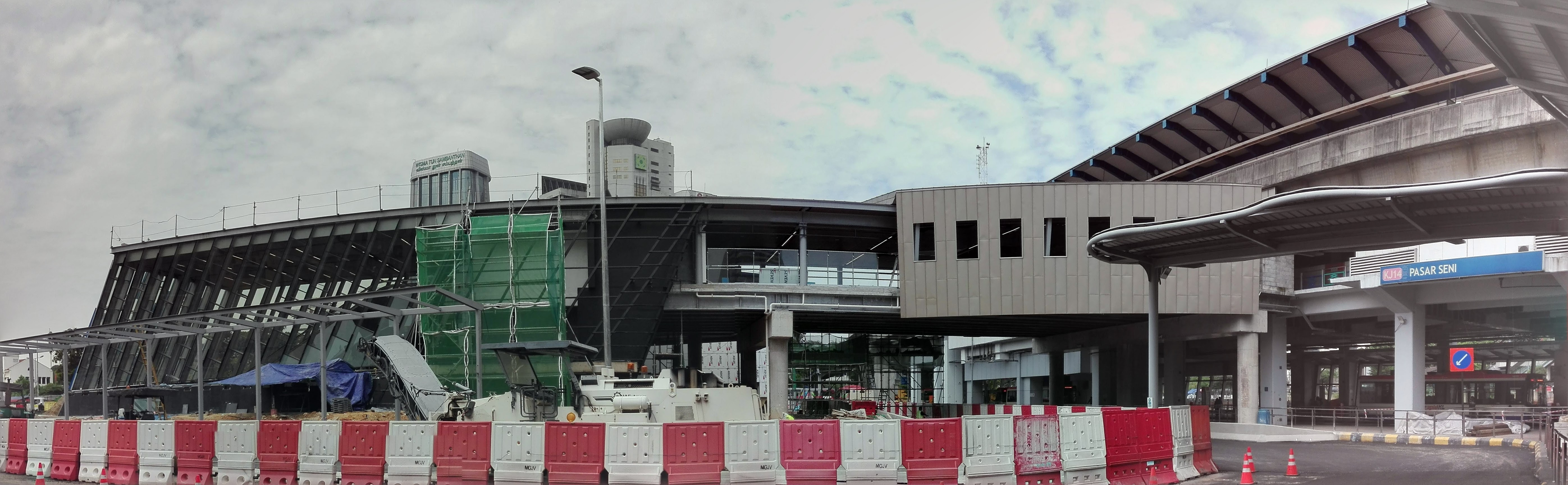
View of the link bridge between the MRT station at left and the LRT station at right in May 2017

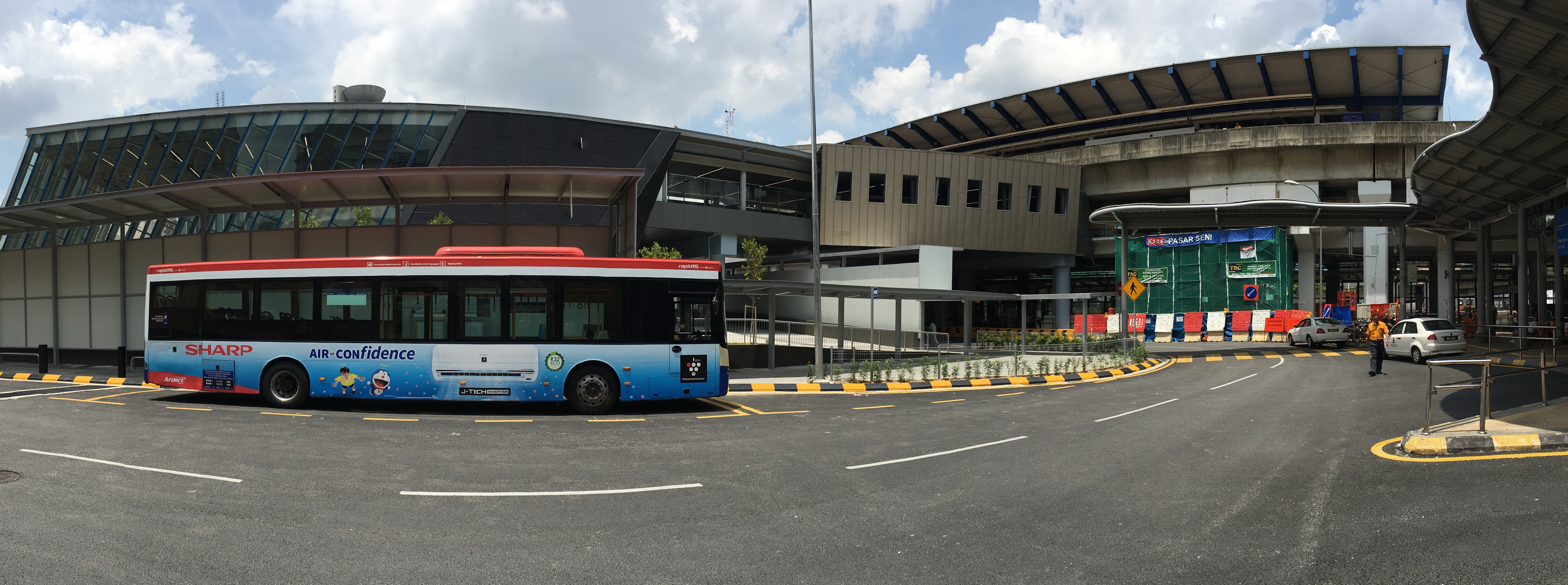
Same view in September 2017

== See also ==
- Rail transport in Malaysia
