= Mouth organ =

Musical instrument

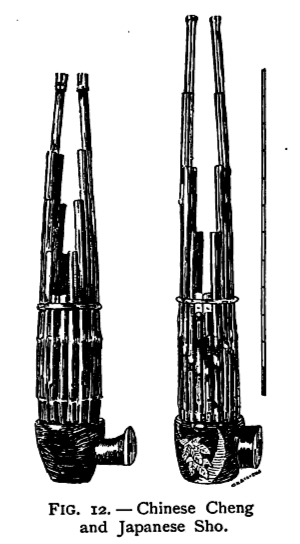
- A Chinese Sheng (L) and a Japanese Shō (R).
- Classification: Wind; aerophone
- Hornbostel–Sachs classification: 412.132 (Free reed aerophone)

More articles or information
- Sheng; Shō; Lusheng; Yu; Saenghwang; Plung; Sompoton; Khene; Harmonica; Melodica

A mouth organ is any free reed aerophone with one or more air chambers fitted with a free reed. Though it spans many traditions, it is played universally the same way by the musician placing their lips over a chamber or holes in the instrument, and blowing or sucking air to create a sound. Many of the chambers can be played together or each individually.

The mouth organ can be found all around the world and is known by many different names and seen in many different traditions. The most notable variations include the harmonica, and Asian free reed wind instruments consisting of a number of bamboo pipes of varying lengths fixed into a wind chest; these include the sheng, khaen, lusheng, yu, shō, and saenghwang. The melodica, consisting of a single tube that is essentially blown through a keyboard, is another variation.

== Gallery ==
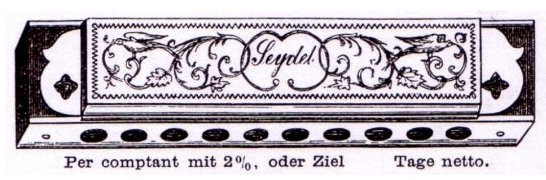
C. A. Seydel Söhne Harmonica (1880)

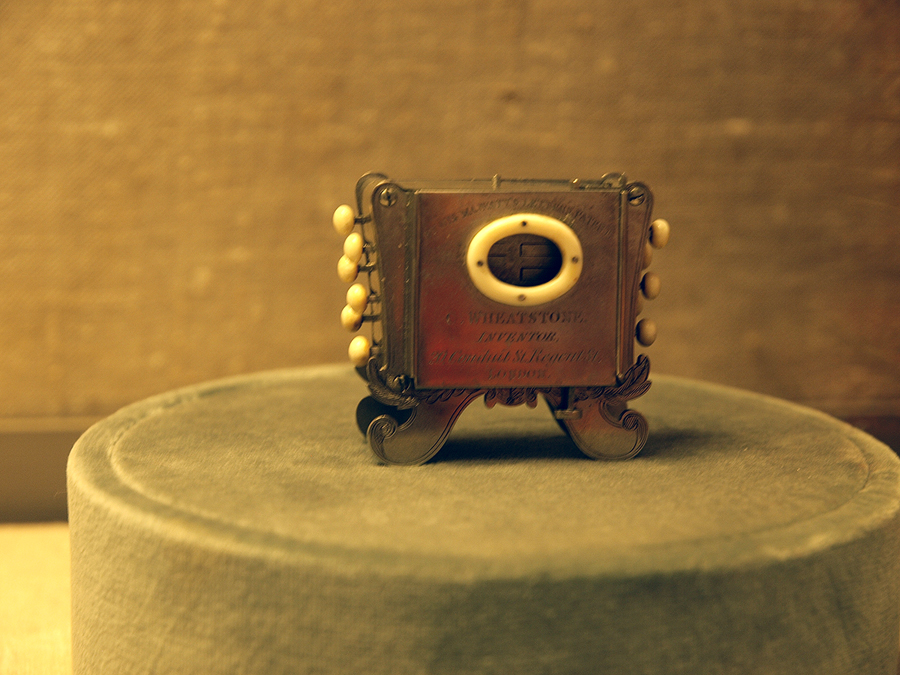
Symphonium (c.1830) by Charles Wheatstone

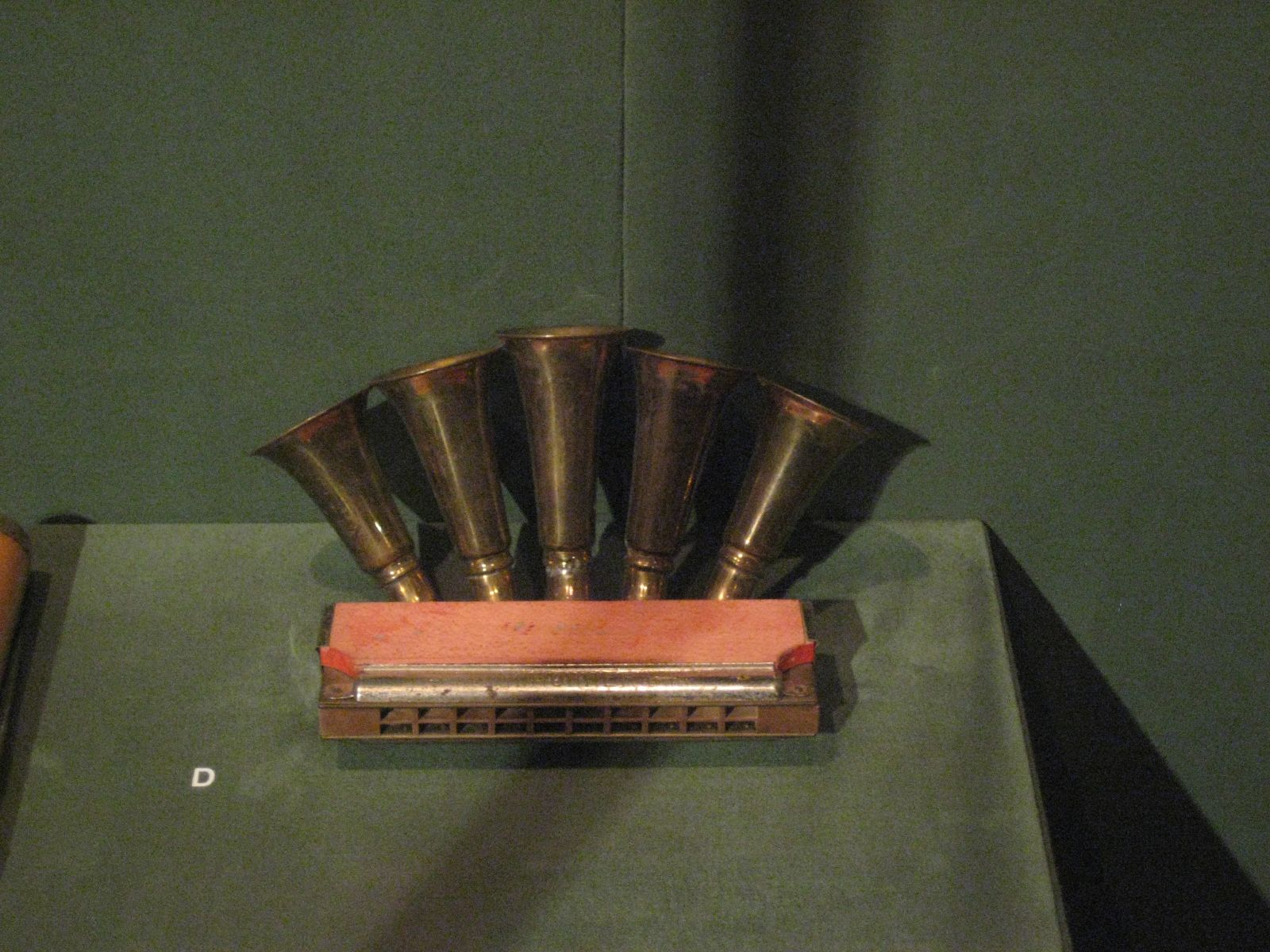
M. Hohner Trumpet Call Harmonica in C (1906)

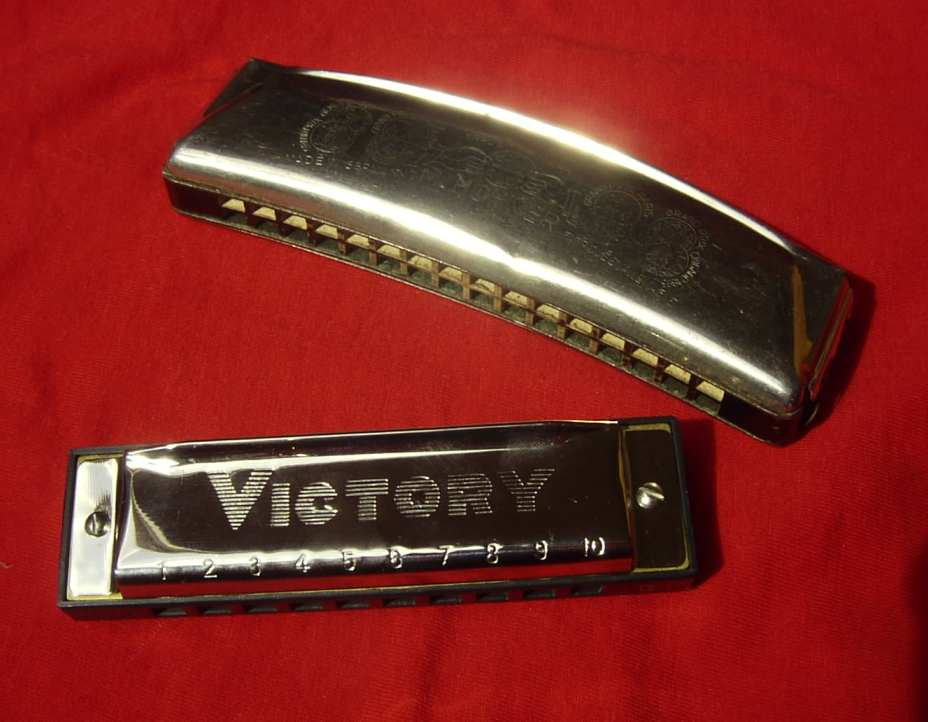
Harmonica (rear) and Blues harp (front)

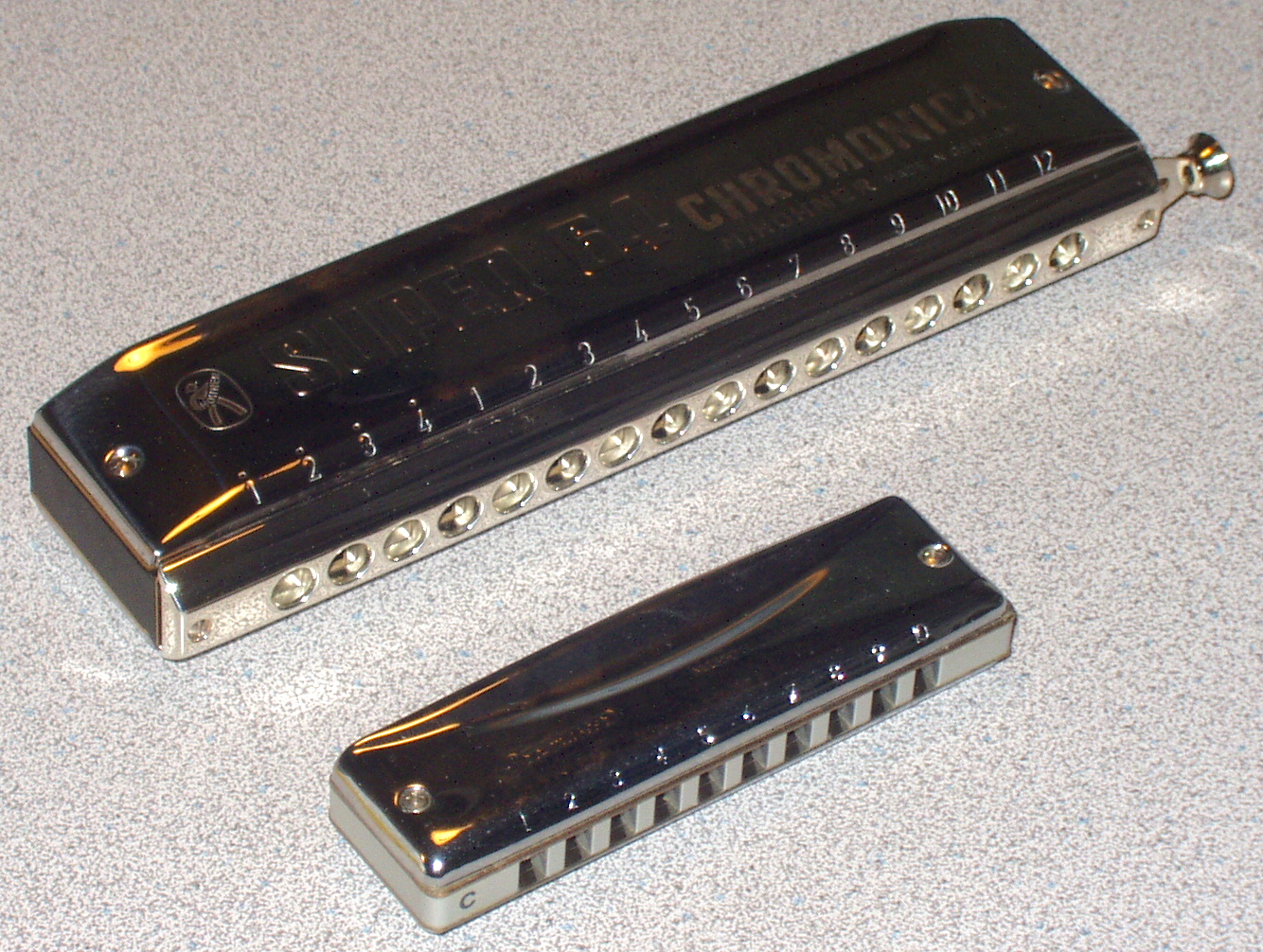
Chromatic 16-hole (over) and diatonic 10-hole (under) harmonica

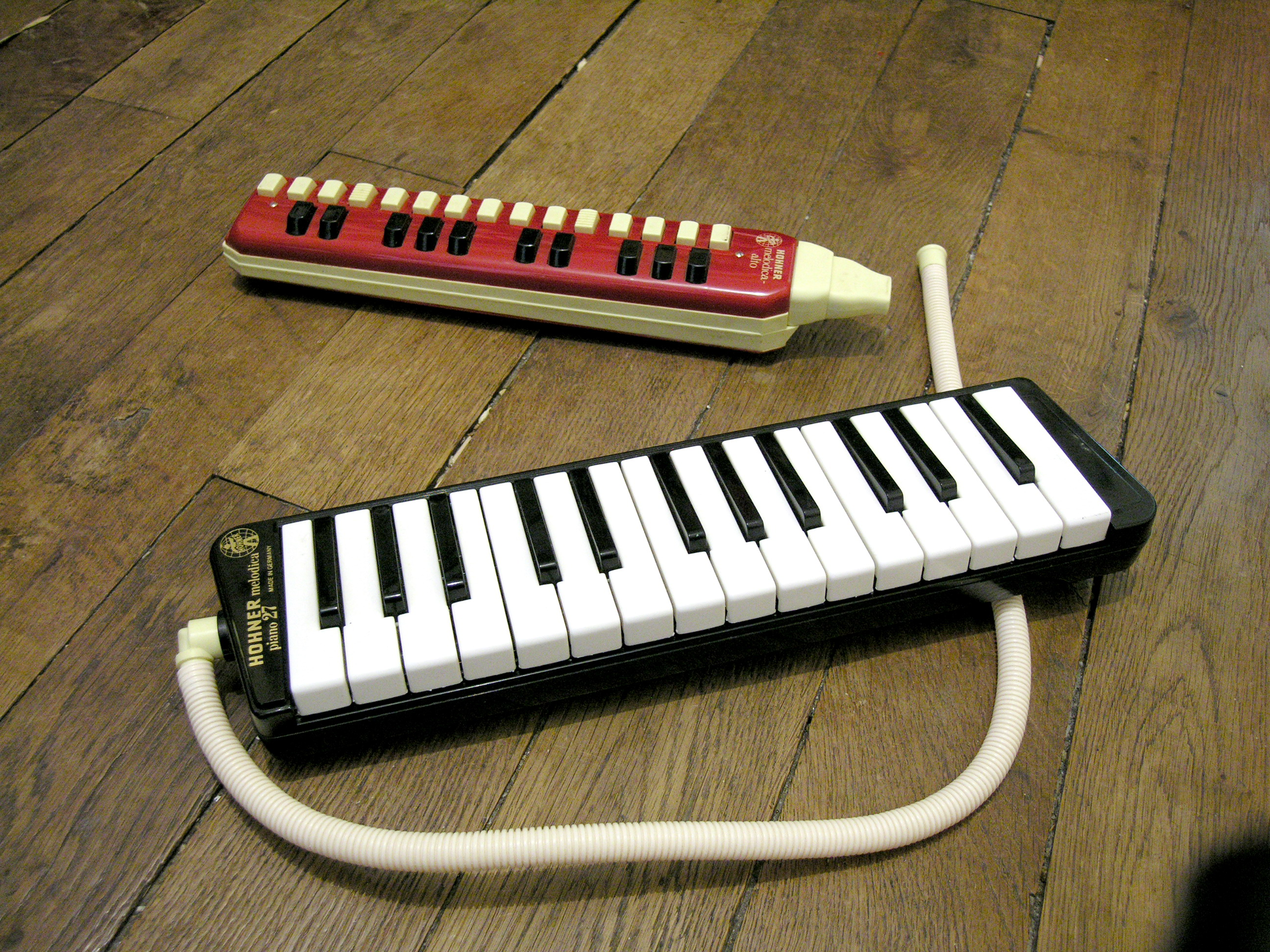
Hohner Melodicas

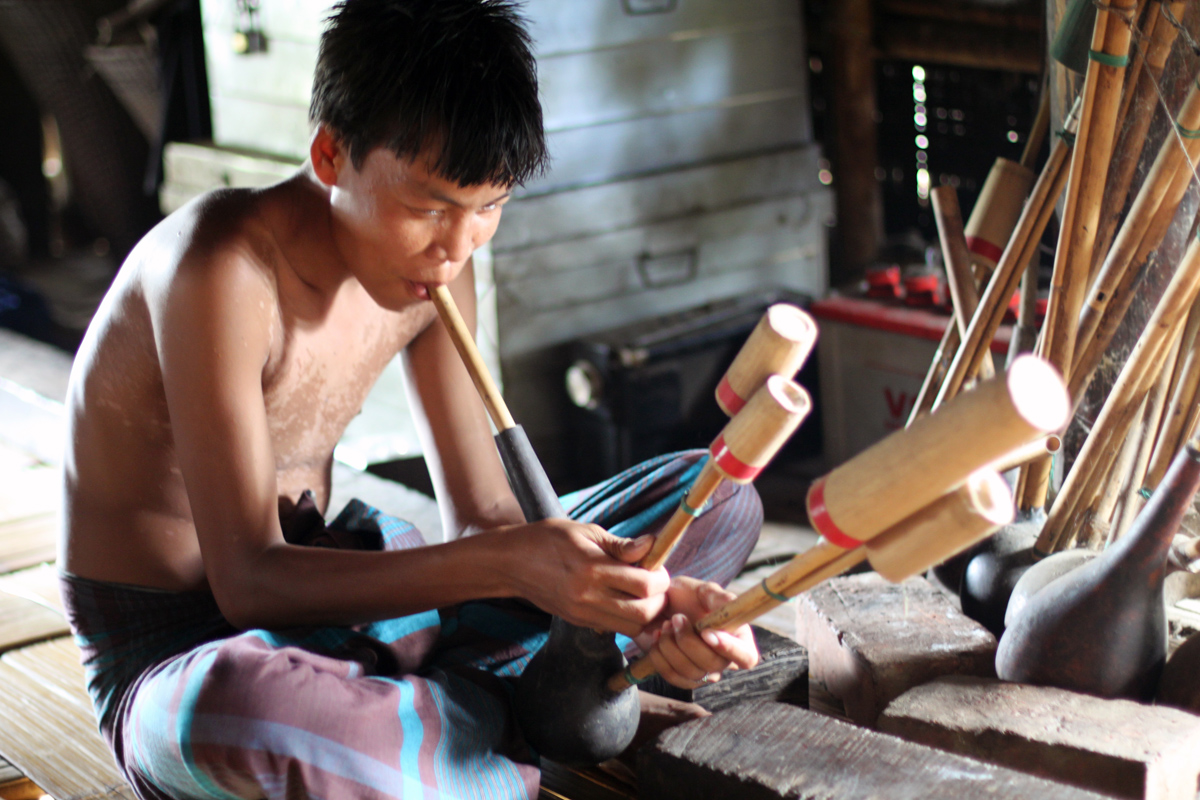
Plung, played by the Mru people of Bangladesh and Burma

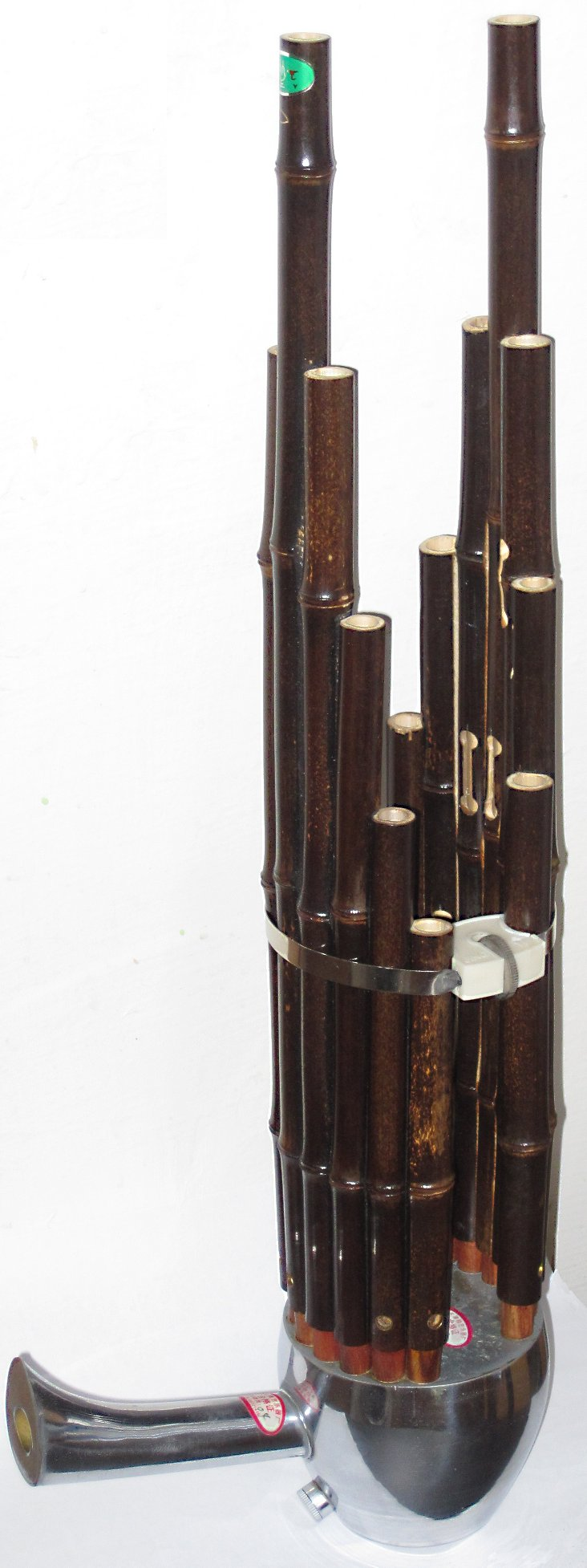
Sheng, a Chinese mouth organ

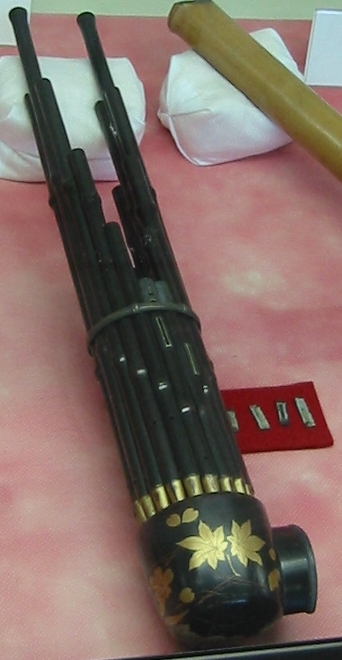
Sho, a Japanese mouth organ

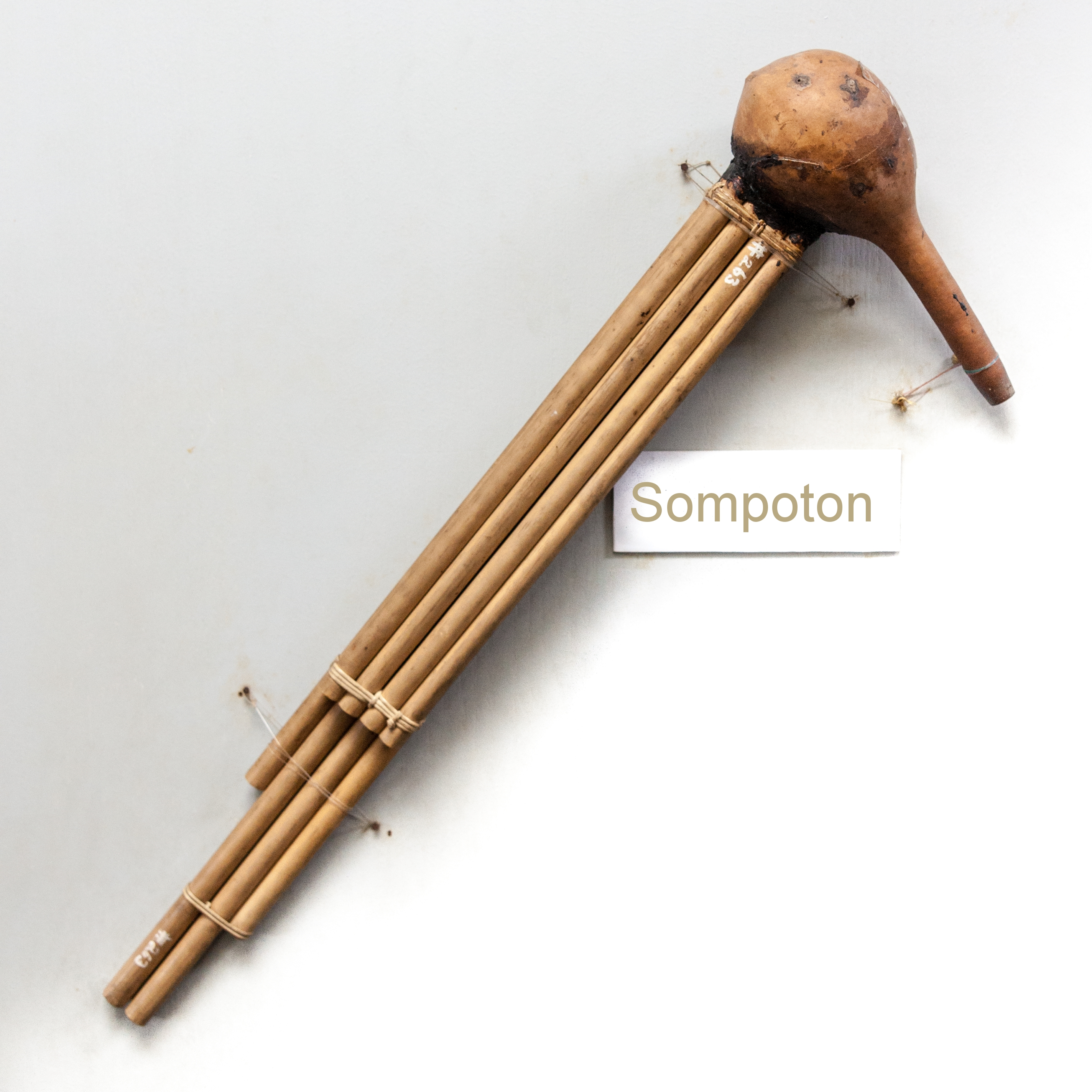
Sompoton of Sabah, Malaysia

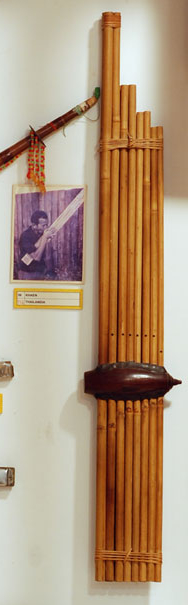
Khene, used in Mainland Southeast Asia

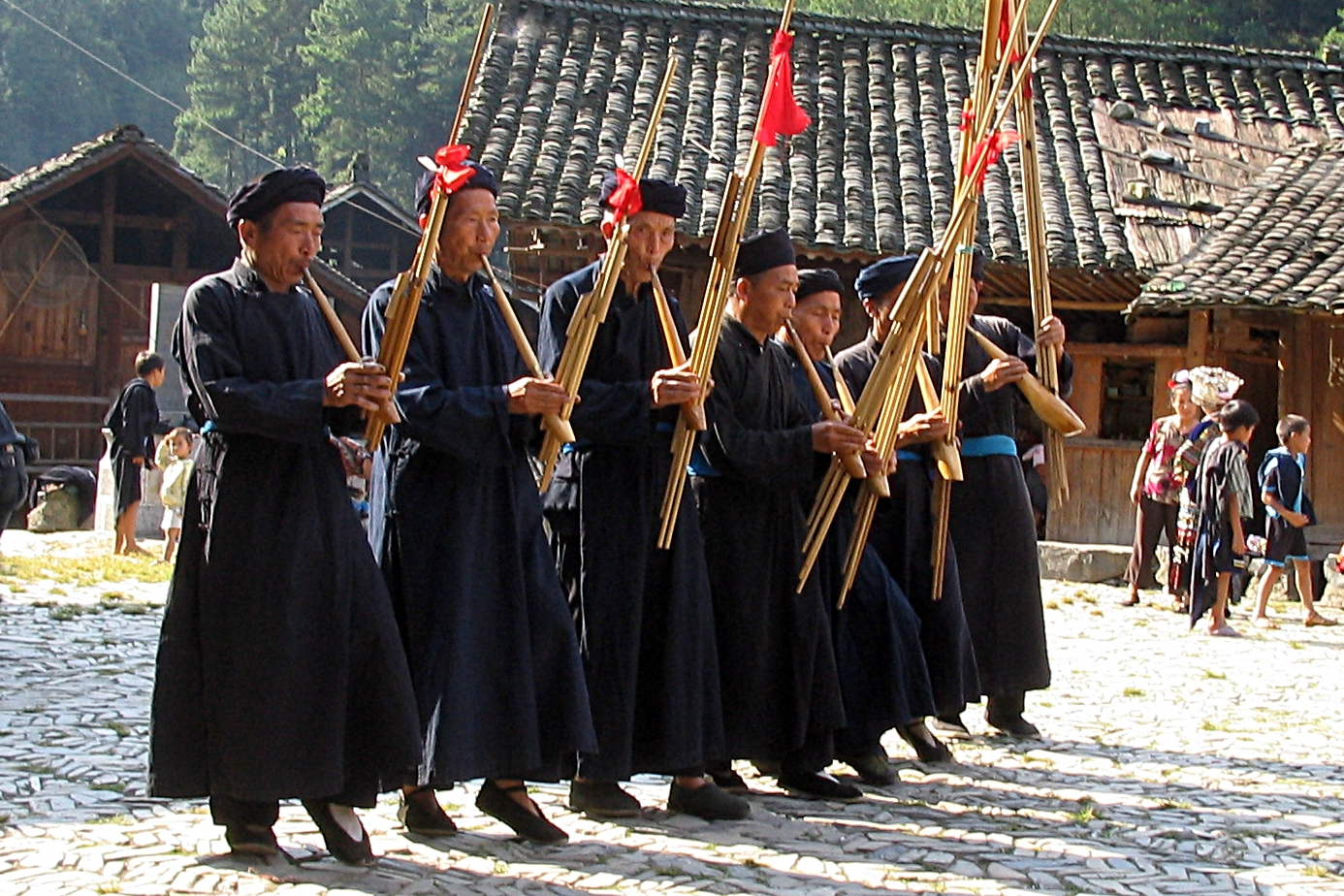
Lusheng, used in Laos, Vietnam, South China

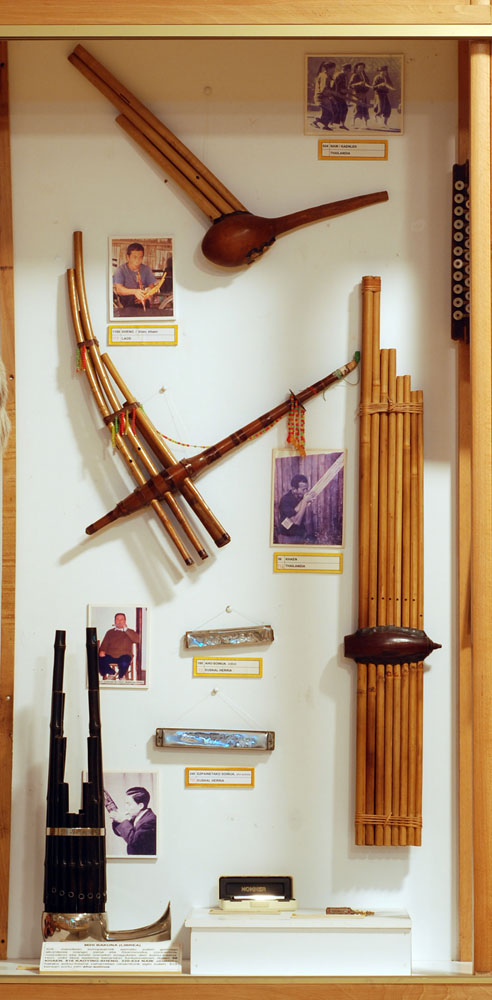

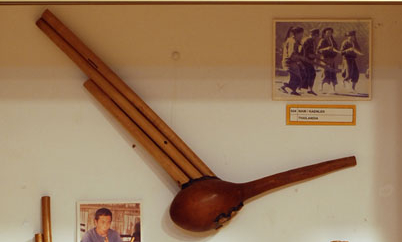
Cambodia, Ploy

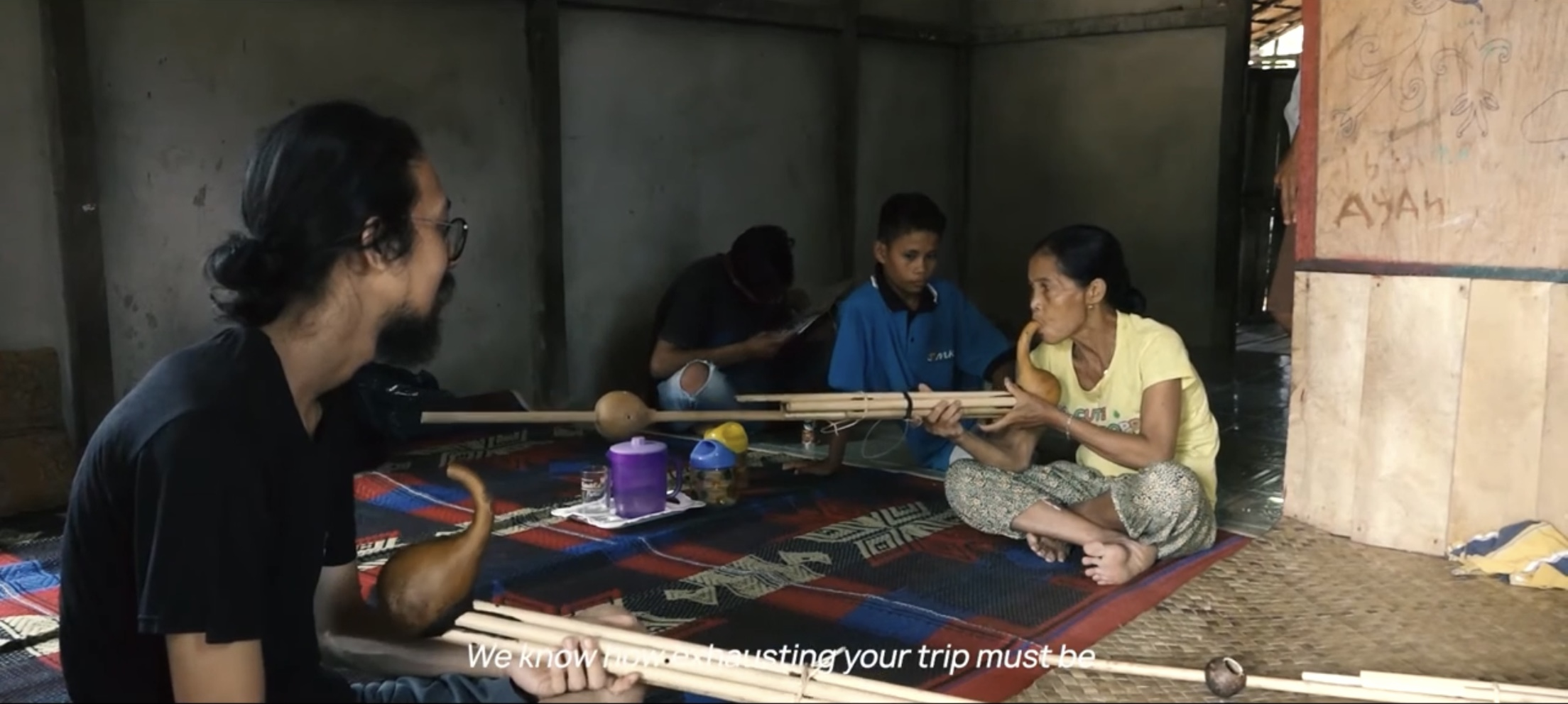
Keluri, used in Borneo.

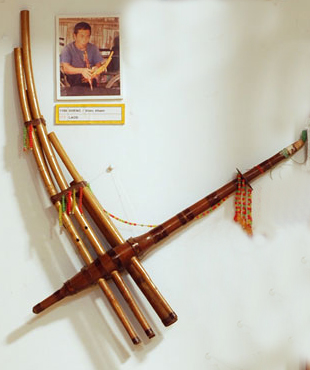
Qeej, free reed gourd mouth organ of the Hmong people

== See also ==
- Gourd mouth organ
