= Gourd mouth organ =

Asian woodwind instrument

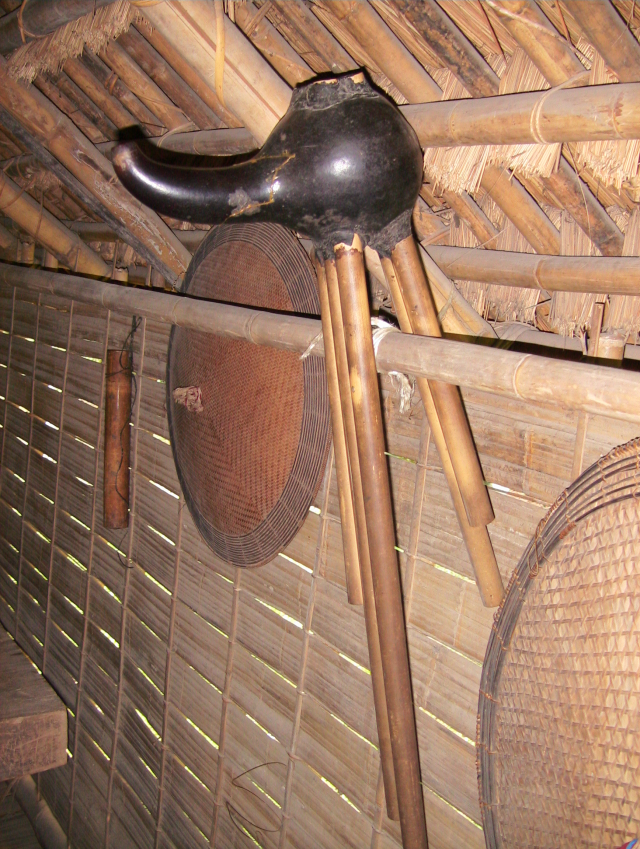
- A đing nǎm of the Ede people of Vietnam's Central Highlands

Woodwind instrument
- Classification: Free reed mouth organ
- Hornbostel–Sachs classification: 412.132 (Sets of free reeds)
- Inventor(s): Empress Nüwa (Chinese belief, actual inventor cannot be traced)
- Developed: 3rd millennium BC

Related instruments
- shō; khene; bawu; harmonica; lusheng

The gourd mouth organ is a free reed mouth organ played across East and Southeast Asia. It consists of a gourd wind chest with several bamboo or bronze pipes inserted on top of it, the numbers of pipes differing from region to region.

The gourd mouth organ is closely associated with cultural minorities in Asian countries; thus, its styles are diverse, and different counterparts can be seen across different cultures. In southern China, the generic name of the gourd mouth organ is Hulu Sheng (Chinese: 葫芦笙; pinyin: húlúshēng; lit. 'gourd sheng'). The accompaniment of the instrument is essential to the ethnic minorities in China's southern province of Yunnan, such as the Lahu, Yi, Miao and Naxi, especially during their ritual Tage dancing.

In southeast Asia, like Upper Myanmar, northern Laos, northeast Thailand, and Rattanakiri province in Cambodia, the gourd mouth organ is also an essential part of the people's daily and ceremonial lives. In Thailand, it is called naw among the Lahu, lachi among the Akha, and fulu among the Lisu; in Cambodia, it is called ploy; in northeastern Borneo, it is called sumpoton; and in Laos, Myanmar, Vietnam and Bangladesh, it is called đing nǎm or m'buot.

The gourd mouth organ is tuned based on the pentatonic scale without semitones, especially in the melodies, and the melodies are usually accompanied by chords. Pitches can be changed by closing and opening the pipe holes. The players hold the instrument almost horizontally and blow into the windchest during aspiration.

== History ==
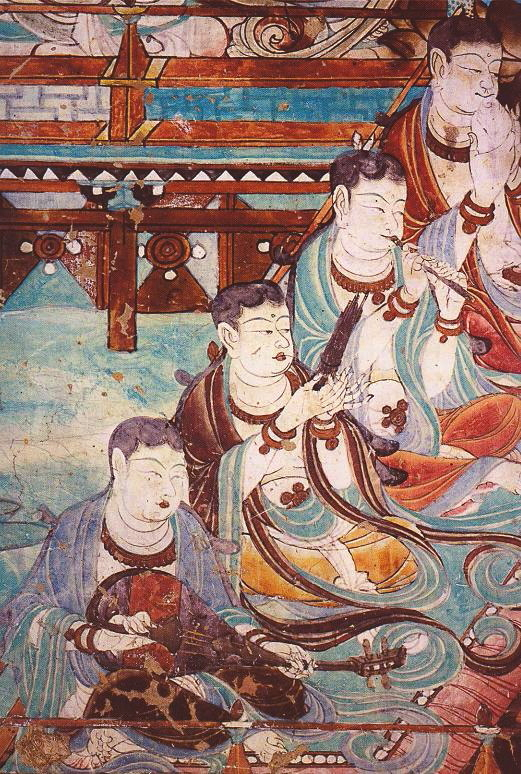
Art from Tang dynasty showing musician playing the mouth organ (2nd left)

In Chinese tradition, empress Nüwa is believed to have invented the mouth organ in the third millennium B.C. to mimic Phoenix's neck, body, and wings. This tradition also explains why the gourd mouth organ is often used in the funeral process: people believe the mouth organ creates a protection spell against evil spirit and charm towards the afterlife. The gourd mouth organ also represents "the gourd" category of the Chinese eight sounds system (八音; Bā yīn). In this system the instruments are classified upon the materials used to make the instruments.

The gourd windchest of the mouth organ is hard to preserve, but bronze windchests have been discovered in central Yunnan, China, dating from around the fifth century BCE. The gourd mouth organ is also recorded in several Chinese historical sources from the Tang dynasty onward, for example, in the Book of Odes (Shijing), Tangyuezhi and Manshu. In Shijing it says: "The lutes are struck, the organ blows; till all its tongues in movement heave. The drums loud sound, the organ swells; their flutes the dancers wave." And in the Manshu (ninth century), it records: "Hulusheng was played by young men wandering on the streets in the evenings to express their love towards girls."

The mouth organ had its widest range of distribution around sixth century A.D. It was spread to Persia from China and was called mushtaq sini, "Chinese mushtak", or chubchiq. The instrument then spread westward in the eighteenth century. Johann Wilde, the inventor of the nail violin, bought or was given a sheng in St. Petersburg and learned to play die lieblieche Chineser Orgel, "the charming organ of the Chinese". From 1800 to the present, a large family of reed instruments, such as mouth harmonicas, accordions, and harmoniums, was created.

== Styles and distribution ==
=== China ===
==== Southern Chinese minorities ====
Traditional Chinese Hulusi

Hulu Sheng is the Han Chinese name of the gourd mouth organ and has different names in different minority groups in southern China, such as Ang in Yi, Maniu in Lisu and Nuo in Lahu. Commonly, the instrument is made of a dried gourd bottle as the windchest with its narrow neck as the mouthpiece. Usually, five bamboo pipes (sometimes four to seven) are inserted vertically in the gourd walls from shorter to longer respectively (from 20 to 45 cm [7.9 to 17.7 in]) and sealed with beeswax with rectangular or triangular free-reeds assembled to each pipe. Next to each pipe, a finger hole is made to activate the free-reed by opening and closing the hole and inhalation (mainly) and exhalation. Slight variations in shape, size, height of the gourd mouth organ can be observed among different minorities groups, for instance, the bamboo pipes used in Hei Miao can go up to fourteen feet high with brass reeds. Another commonly seen instrument that is similar to Hulu Sheng is called Hulusi, which is also primarily used in Yunnan. It can be seen as the simplified version of Hulu Sheng that has three bamboo pipes passing through a gourd windchest and only the middle pipe has finger holes.

==== Other regions ====
Soprano Sheng playing chromatic scale

In other regions of China, among the Han people, the most common recognised ensemble free-reed mouth organ is called Sheng. It has a modified windchest based on the traditional gourd mouth organ where the gourd is replaced by a piece of wood or metal cut in the same shape to increase its volume and range. Sheng was spread from China to Korea during the Three Kingdoms period and was called Saenghwang in Korean. In the eighth century, Sheng was given to the Japanese court at Nara as a gift and was later remodeled into the Japanese Shō.

=== Southeast Asia ===
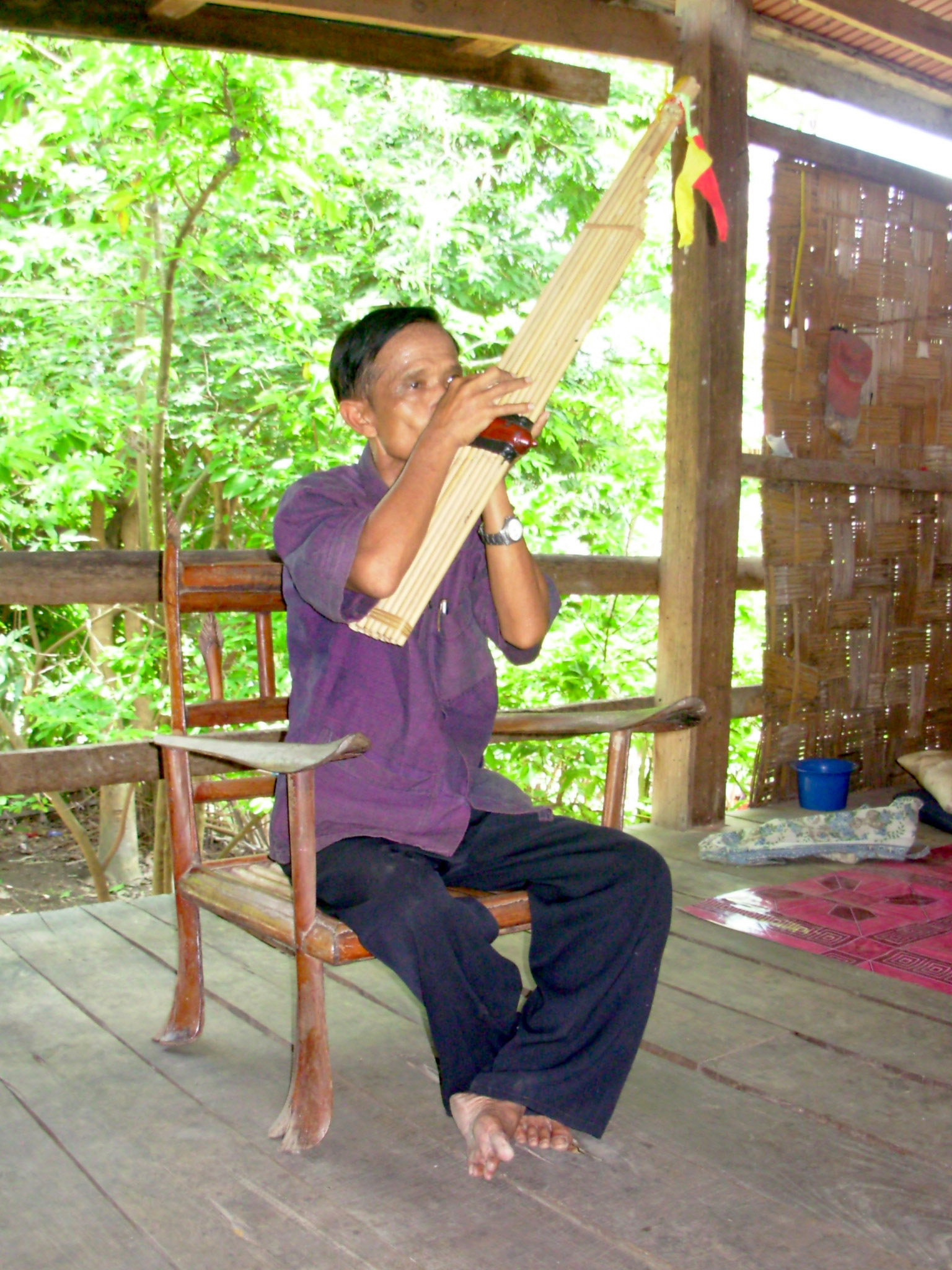
A Mangkong man plays khene in Laos

The gourd mouth organ has four subtypes in Southeast Asia.

1. Pipes extending outwardly from a bottle gourd wind-chest with a tubular embouchure in a circular array.
2. Pipes in a circular arrangement that are perfectly parallel to each other, with an embouchure immediately in a wooden or metal wind-chest.
3. Pipes in two parallel lines, closely spaced, with an embouchure immediately in a wooden tube wind-chest. Sometimes, the rows of pipes are arranged across the wind-chest.
4. Pipes are widely spaced and in two nearly parallel lines, together with a long tubular embouchure, traveling through a tubular wooden wind-chest.

Type 1 is the most common and diverse one among the cultural minorities in mainland Southeast Asia. Type 2 is usually associated with classical performance and is very similar to Chinese sheng. Examples of type 3 can be the Vietnamese M’buôt, the Bangladeshi Plung and Thai-Lao Khene or Khaen, whereas type 4 has close relation to Hmong people of southern China and adjacent countries. Type 3 M’buôt is found in Truòng Son Ranges of Vietnam, and in Champa, a similar instrument is called rakle. Khene can be found at northeast Thai-Lao regions, and it is considered as national instrument in Laos. Today, Khene can be found in four sizes with six, fourteen, sixteen and eighteen pipes.

In upper Myanmar and northern Laos, the mouth organ is in a raft form with two rafts of pipes cross inside the windchest, and one of them either projects under it (X-shaped) or cut off at the bottom of the gourd (V-shaped). In central and south Laos, the gourd is replaced by a wooden windchest with double rafts pierced through it and can go up to twelve feet. In the Boutoy District of Mondulkiri Province, the Por and Kuoy of Kampong Chhnang, Pursat, and Siem Reap provinces in Cambodia, the gourd moth organ is called Ploy or Mbaut among upland Mon-Khmer speakers, with five to seven bamboo pipes inserted into the windchest.

The gourd mouth organ and its variants belong to one of the six types of free-reed instruments in southeast Asia. And these instruments are more reminiscent of similar wind instruments found today in southern Chinese minorities than of their Han counterparts (sheng).

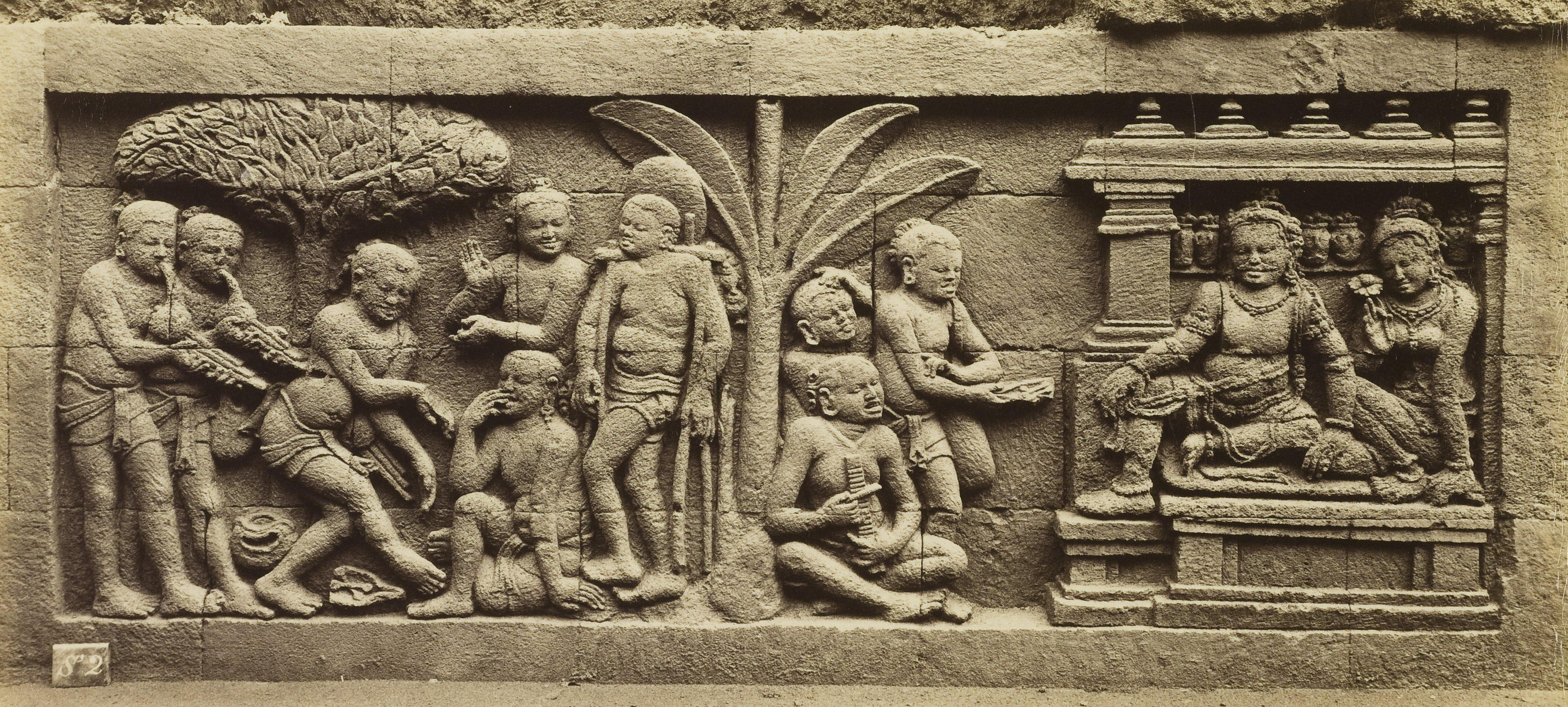
Mouth organs were depicted at Borobudur in the 9th century C.E.

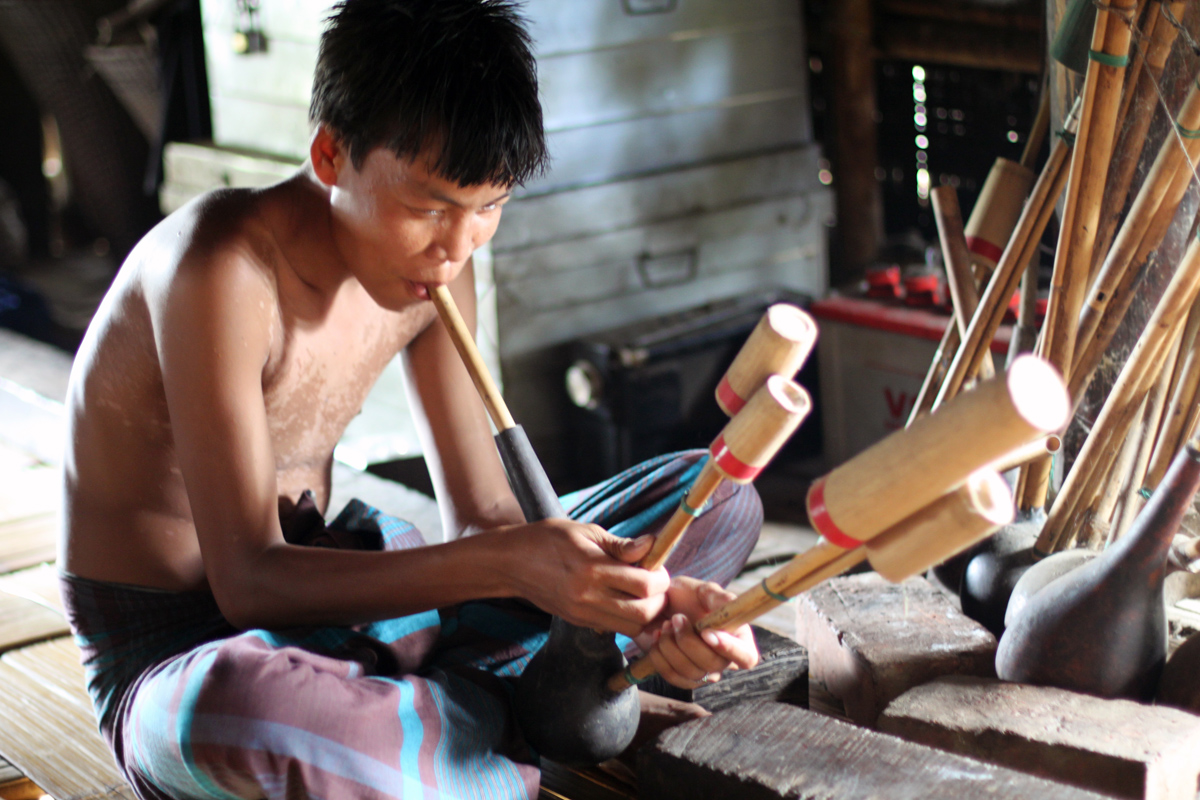
Plung, played by the Mru people of Bangladesh and Burma

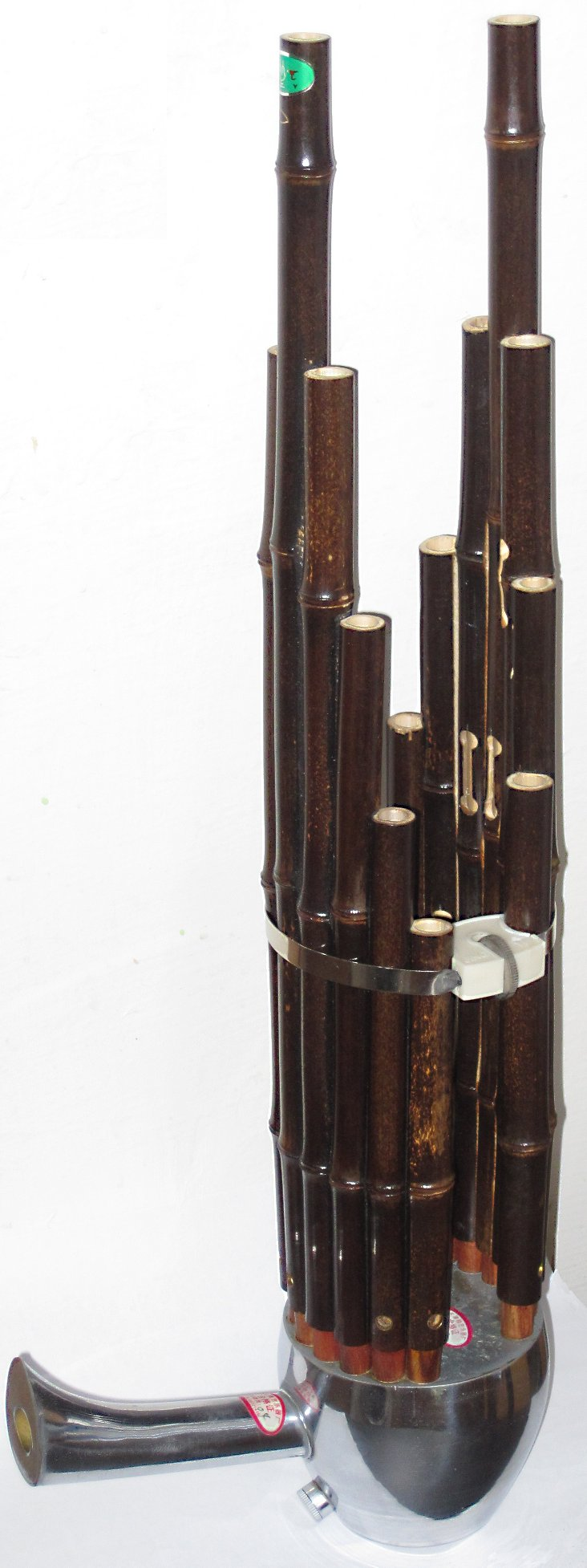
Sheng, a Chinese mouth organ

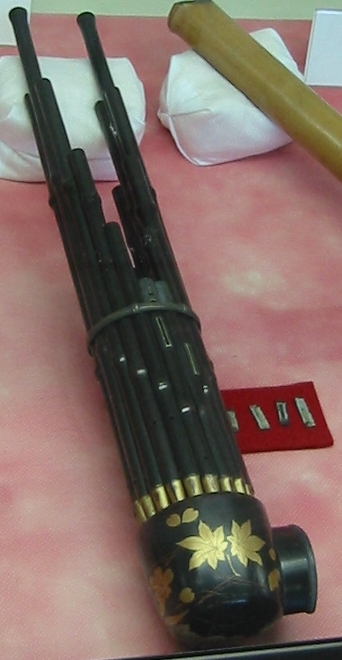
Sho, a Japanese mouth organ

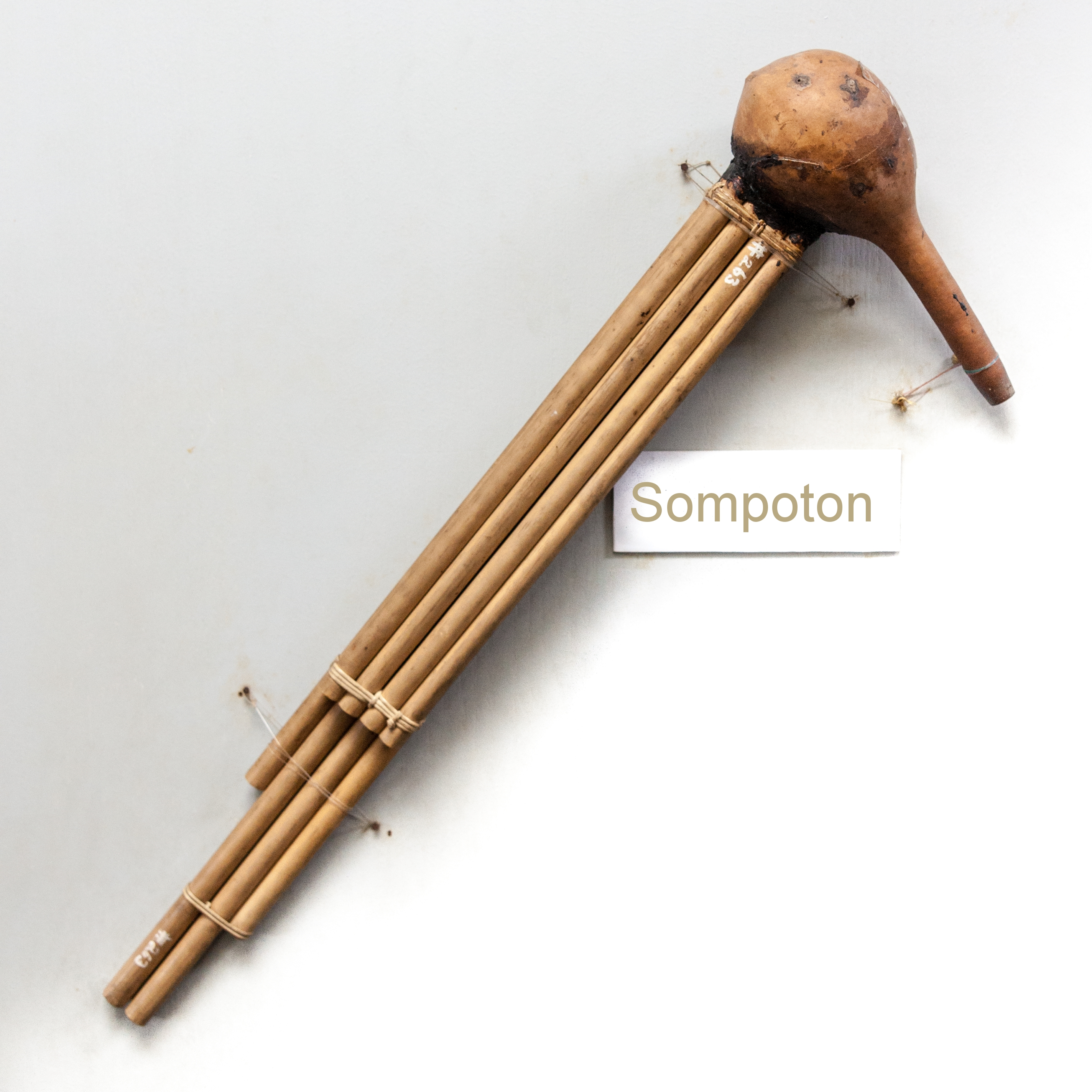
Sompoton of Sabah, Malaysia

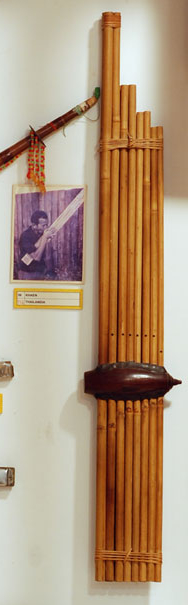
Khene, used in Mainland Southeast Asia

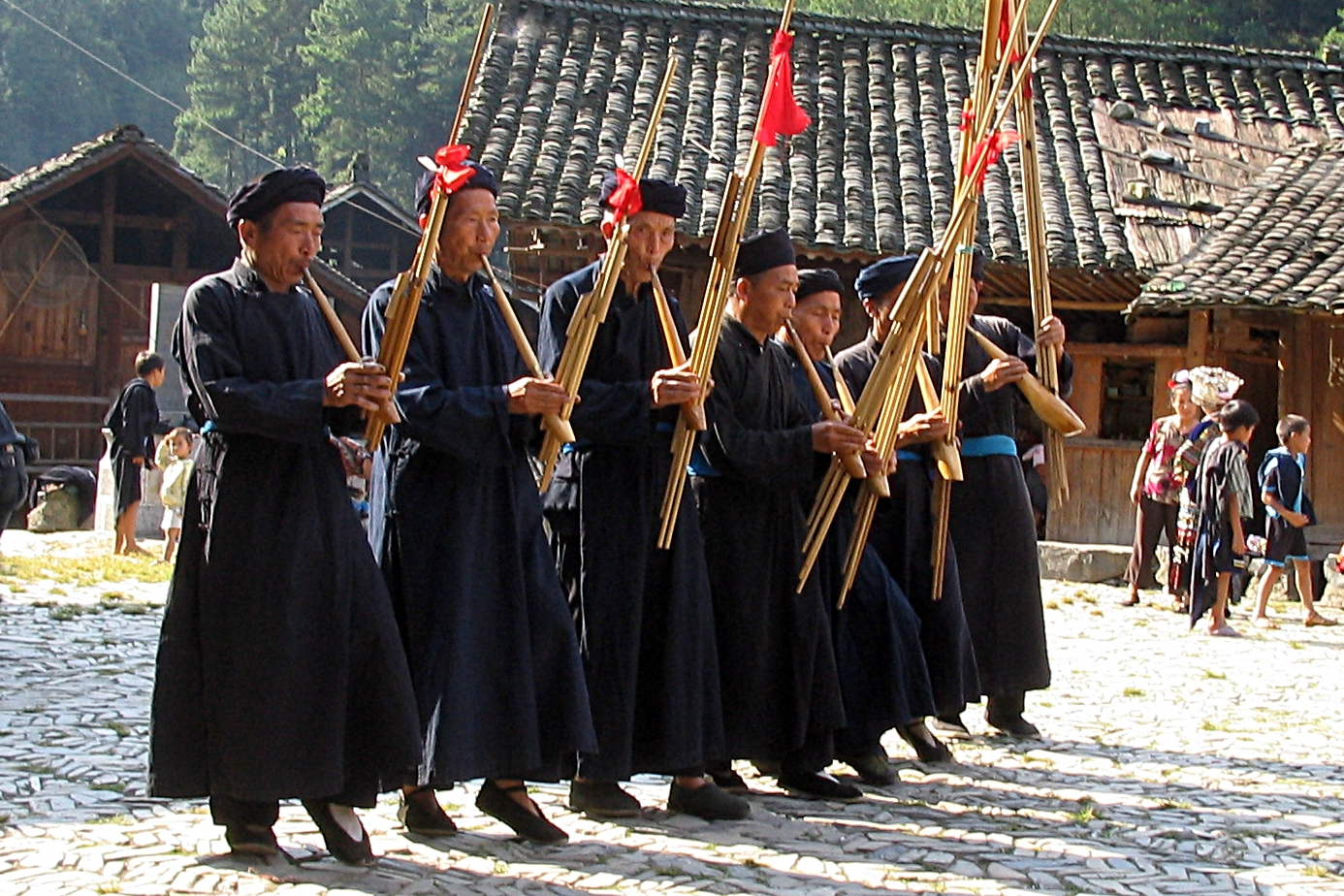
Lusheng, used in Laos, Vietnam, South China

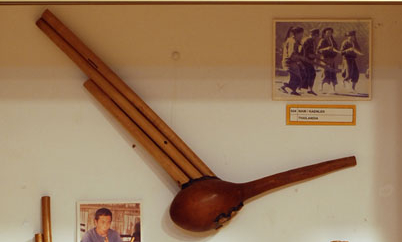
Cambodia, Ploy

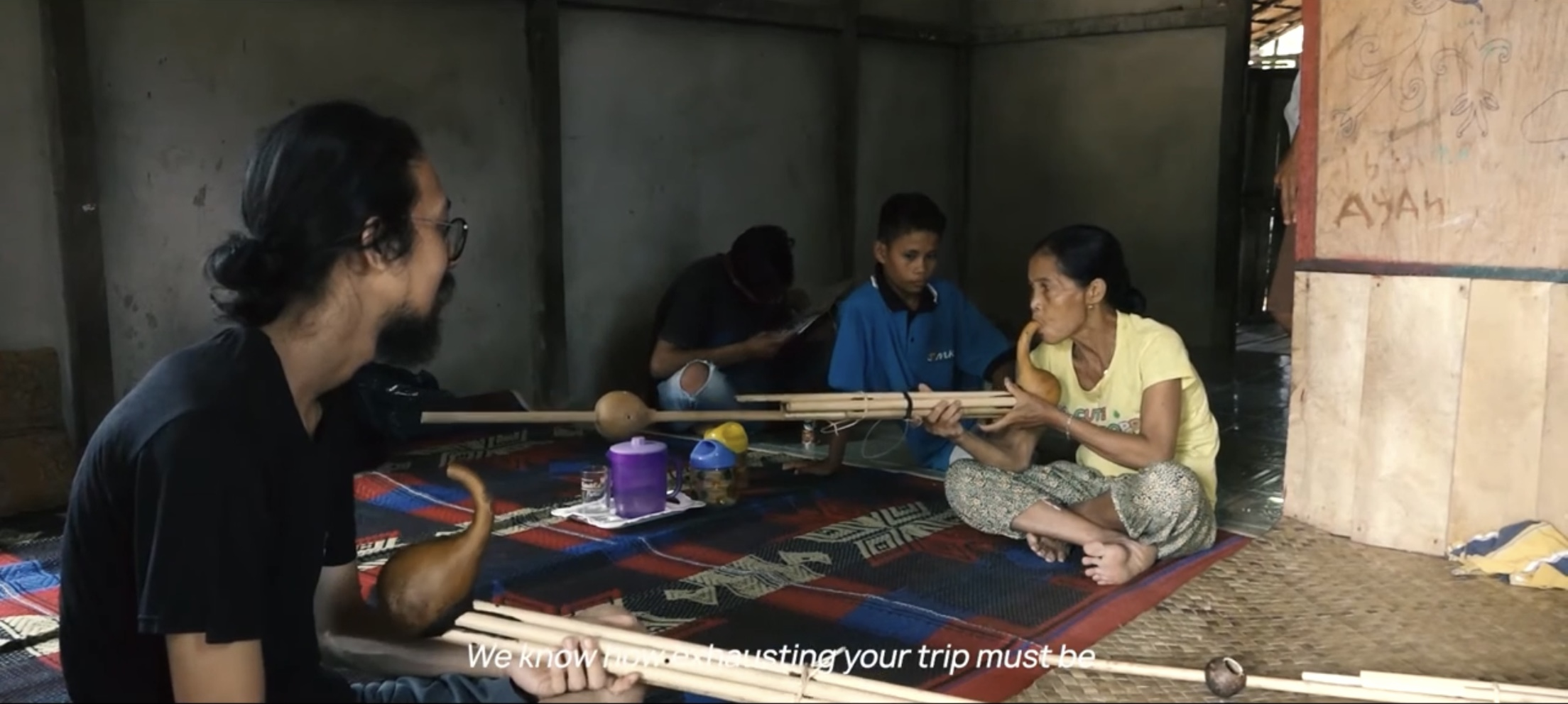
Keluri, used in Borneo.

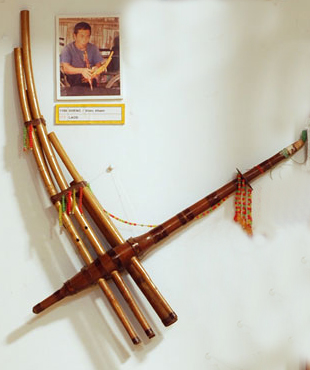
Qeej, free reed gourd mouth organ of the Hmong people

== Playing techniques ==
The finger holes outside each pipe must be closed to make a sound. The players hold the instrument either vertically and horizontally depending on the shape and size of the instrument, with their lips touching the mouthpiece (the "bent neck") and 'blows' out the air at a controlled rate during aspiration. The free reed's shape guarantees that it will make a sound during both inhalation and exhalation, differentiating it from other forms of reed. Circular breathing is often used to provide the continuous stream of sound. Two performance techniques are also used, including dayin, pulsing articulation that makes a ‘breaking tone’, and huayin, portamento that makes a ‘sliding tone’.

The tuning is pentatonic without semitones and the pitches can be changed by closing the pipe holes. The chord usually supplements the melody. And two of the eleven regular chords correspond to occidental minor triads; the rest are composed of pentatonic-scaled, concurrent notes (e.g., A B D E F#) or in other combinations (e.g., G# A B C D F#).

Additional resonators may be used to reinforce the sound. The resonator is usually made of a bottle-gourd placed at the end of the pipe or a large horizontal bamboo internode placed at the end of the longest pipe.

== Musical application ==
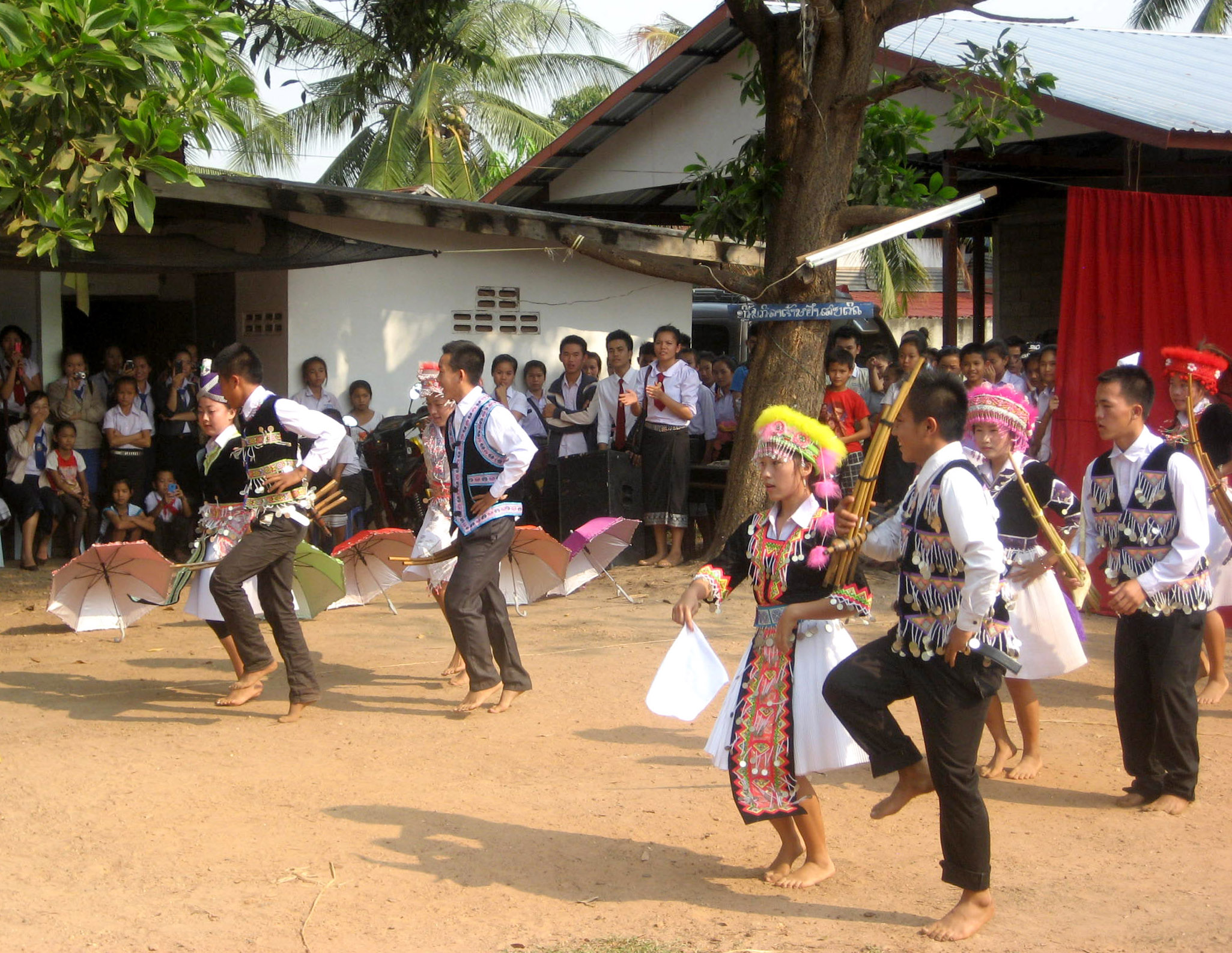
Hmong (Miao) high school students perform a traditional dance accompanied by khene

=== China ===
In China, apart from using the gourd mouth organ at funerals and wedding ceremonies, it is also an essential part of the Tage dancing ("stomping songs") among ethnic minority groups like Yi, Naxi, Lahu, Miao, Tibetan, Bai, Hani, Jingpo, Achang, Lisu, Pumi, Nu, and Du-long people in southwest regions who are closely related to the ancient Diqiang people. The singing and dancing style known as "Tage" is one of their typical traditional rituals that has been practiced since ancient times. With a tradition of 2500 years, Tage accompanied by Hulu Sheng is believed to significantly impact people's emotional outlooks, temperaments, and life desires. The dance is so popular among the Yi, Bai, and Naxi peoples that pictures of it may be seen embroidered on everyday apparel and jewelry.

The dance is usually accompanied by Hulu Sheng, and on occasion, lusheng with a long pipe, together with horizontal and vertical bamboo flutes, three- and four-stringed plucked instruments, and suona. In Songshi (History of the Song dynasty) it also records that men and women from many ethnic groups in Yunnan would come together, playing instruments such as the gourd mouth organ and the flute; and when the musician began playing the gourd mouth organ, tens of other members joined in the dance, circling the musician and stomping their feet to make rhythmical beats similar to drums.

=== Southeast Asia ===
==== Laos ====
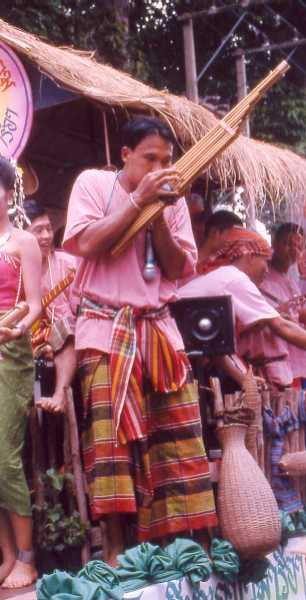
Khene player at the Ubon Candle Festival

In Laos, the primary function of Khene (the gourd mouth organ in Laotian) is to accompany singing. In Iam nithan, long tales derived from Buddhist sathaka (the stones of Buddha's previous births) were sung by a soloist accompanied by a khene. And in rituals of healings and possessions, ritualists, generally elderly women accompanied by a khene, sing to invite the offended spirits to enter their bodies and explain the cause of the illness. Apart from singing and ritual procedures, Khene is also played by young men, together with other instruments, combining harmonies in four parts in Wooing games.

==== Thailand ====
In Thailand, similar healing ritual called Lam phi fa (curing ceremony) is also accompanied by Khaen (mouth organ in Thai). During the ceremony, Khaen is played while mawlam phi fa, mostly women who can attract spirits, dancing around an altar of sacred objects. And in early 1970s, the Lam Klawn (repartee singing) accompanied by khaen became the most popular entertainment in northeast Thailand. Khaen is also used in local shadowed puppet theatres with a combination of speaking and singing to tell a local story in local languages.

==== Cambodia ====
In Rattanakiri and Mundulkiri provinces of Cambodia, the Ploy (gourd mouth organ in Cambodian) and the bronze gong ensemble are played during the ritual sacrifice of buffalo (kapp krabey phoeuk sra). The ploy is also played at other traditional dances such as Wild Ox (tun-song) and Peacock of Pursat (kngaok Posatt) in Pursat and Kamopong Chhnaing provinces.

==== Myanmar ====
In Myanmar, the Lahu people (minority of Myanmar) play the gourd mouth organ during courtship. During this period of romance, young people camp around two large bonfires, one for the girls and one for the boys. Accompanied by the gourd mouth organ, the boys stamp their feet collectively, and the girls create a tight swinging circle around them.

The Akha who are Tibeto-Burman-speaking people, play the gourd mouth organ (lachi), the Jew's harp (chau) and the three-stringed lute (döm) both during festivals and at leisure.

In Lisu, the gourd mouth organ is called fulu in their Biteto-Burman language. It is often played with a flute (julü), and a three-stringed long lute (subu) as an ensemble.

== See also ==
- Sho
- Hulusi
- Keluri
- Khene
- Lusheng
- Ploong
- Ploy
- Sheng
- Sompoton
