= Christopher Adler =

Christopher Adler may refer to:

- Christopher Adler (musician) (born 1972), American musician, composer and professor of music
- Christopher Adler (lyricist) (1954–1984), American lyricist
- Death of Christopher Alder (1960–1998), British ex-paratrooper who died in police custody
- Chris Adler (born 1972), American drummer
