= International Piano Competition of Orléans =

Classical music competition in France

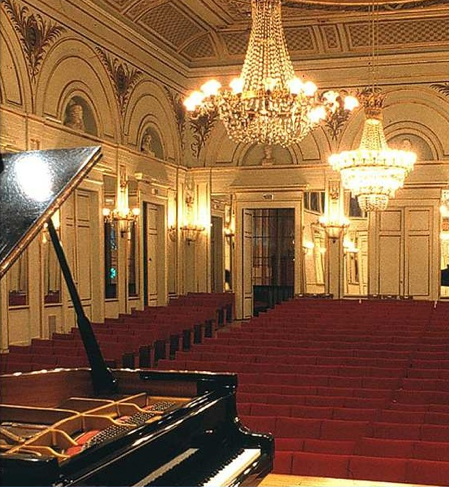
La Salle d'Institut, the hall of Conservatoire of Orléans where the competition takes place.

The International Piano Competition of Orléans (French: Concours International de Piano d'Orléans) is an international piano competition, dedicated exclusively to music of the 20th and 21st centuries, that is held biannually in Orléans, France. The only of its kind as of 2022, the competition was founded in 1994 by French pianist and pedagogue Françoise Thinat. It is a member of the World Federation of International Music Competitions and a partner of the Busoni Competition.

For every edition, a piece is commissioned from an internationally established composer as an obligatory piece for the competitors. Those who have written for the competition include Eric Tanguy, Patrick Burgan, Thierry Escaich, Pierre Jodlowski, Édith Canat de Chizy, Philippe Hurel, Jacques Lenot, Jérôme Combier, Philippe Hersant, Hèctor Parra, Pascal Dusapin and Philippe Manoury. The jury has included, over the years, İdil Biret, Claude Helffer, François-Frédéric Guy and Unsuk Chin.

== History ==
In 1989 Francoise Thinat founded an association to promote piano music of the 20th century. The first edition of the competition took place in 1994. She imagined

an ideal competition, with a unique programme, an open repertoire, a collegial jury ... an age limit which would encourage «a second breath», without discouraging very young talents....

Starting 1998, every participant should include a work by a young composer of choice, and a composition prize is awarded to the composer of the piece deemed best by the jury. Six years after, in 2004, the first edition for children, "Brin d'herbe", took place.

== Laureates ==
Year	1st Prize	2nd Prize	3rd Prize	Composition Award André Chevillion – Yvonne Bonnaud
1994	Shinji Urakabe Japan	Hideki Nagano Japan	Ananda Sukarlan Indonesia	
1996	Fabio Grasso Italy Thomas Hell Germany		Rita Kinka Hungary	
1998	Toros Can Turkey Ami Fujiwara Japan	Ami Fujiwara Japan	Maria Stembolskaya Russia	Unsuk Chin South Korea Franck Krawczyk France
2000	Saori Mizumura Japan	Andrea Corazziari Italy	Alexandre Pirojenko Russia	Muhiddin Dûrrûoglu-Demiriz Belgium
2002	Winston Choi Canada	Nino Jvania Georgia	Makoto Ueno Japan	Vykintas Baltakas Lithuania
2004	Francesco Schlime Luxembourg	Reto Reichenbach Switzerland	Ya-Ou Xie China	Kenneth Hesketh UK
2006	Wilhem Latchoumia France	Prodromos Symeonidis Greece	Ermis Theodorakis Greece	David Rakowski USA
2008	Florence Cioccolani France	Antal Sporck Netherlands	Adam Marks USA	Mayoko Fukami Japan Vera Ivanova RussiaUSA Thierry Huillet France
2010	Christopher Falzone USA	Yejin Gil South Korea	Anaël Bonnet France	Adam Roberts USA
2012	Christopher Guzman USA	Andrew Zhou USA		Christopher Stark USA
2014	Imri Talgam Israel	Aline Piboule France	Kathrin Isabelle Klein Germany	Didier Rotella France Nicolas Mondon France
2016	Takuya Otaki Japan	Marianna Abrahamyan Armenia	Philippe Hattat France	Philippe Hattat France Matthias Krüger Belgium
2018	Maroussia Gentet France	Hyeonjun Jo South Korea	Miharu Ogura Japan	Miharu Ogura Japan Hyeonjun Jo South Korea
2020	Mikhaïl Bouzine Russia Germany	Dmitry Batalov Russia	Chae-Um Kim South Korea	Tetsuya Yamamoto Japan
2022	Lorenzo Soulès France	Chisato Taniguchi Japan	Chi Ho Han South Korea	Matthieu Acar France Miharu Ogura Japan

== See also ==
- List of classical music competitions
