= Sompoton =

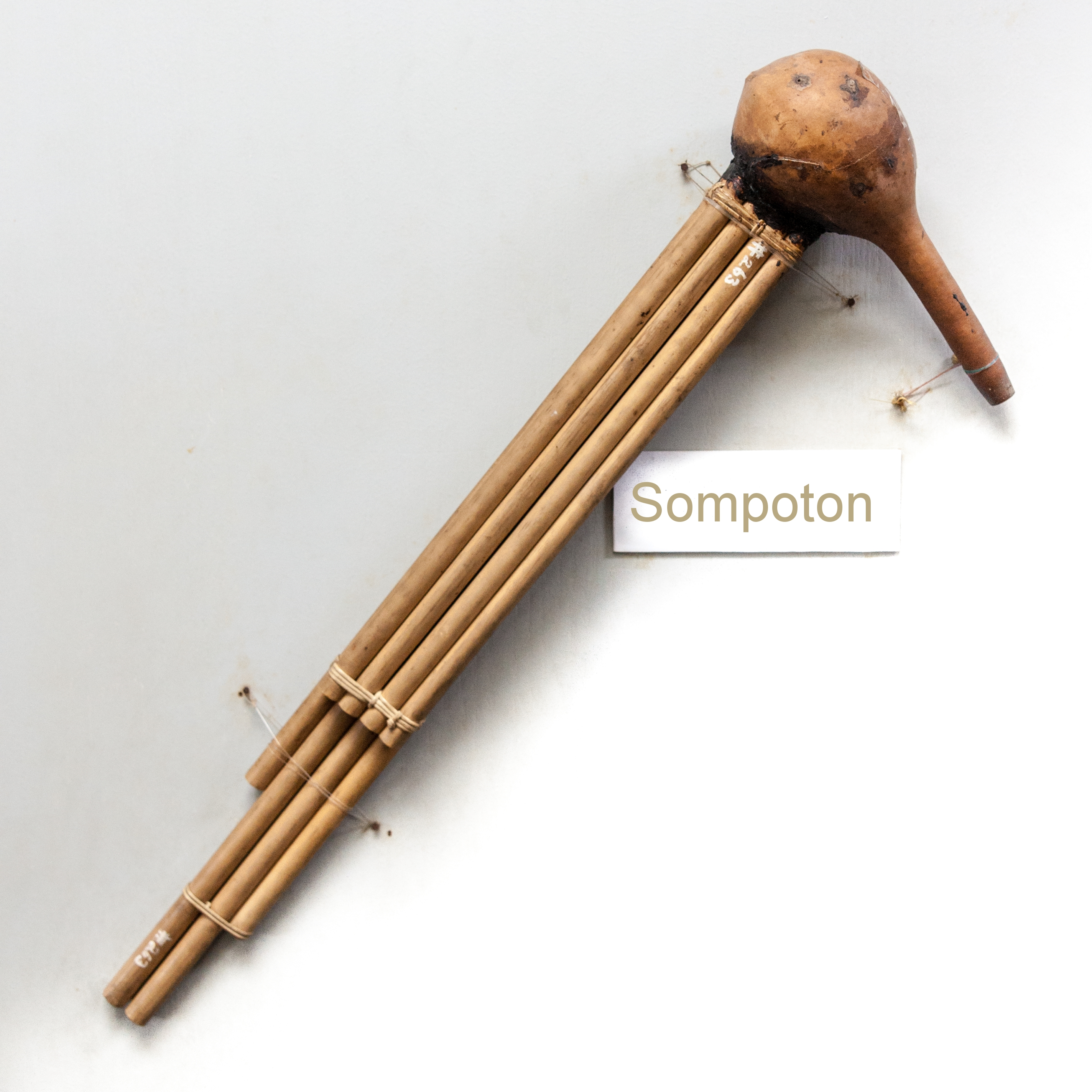
- An example of a Murut sompoton, exhibited in Sandakan Heritage Museum, 1st floor, in the former British North Borneo Museum.
- Classification: Mouth organ
- Developed: Northern Borneo: Sabah, Malaysia

Sompoton or Sumpotan, is a mouth organ made from a calabash gourd with bamboo pipes in northern Borneo. It originated in the state of Sabah and is played by indigenous men and women in Sabah, especially by the Kadazan-Dusun and Murut.

== Description ==
A sompoton consists of eight pieces of bamboo pipe inserted into a dried gourd sealed with bees' wax, which serves as a wind chamber. Unlike a bamboo flute, which is a straight pipe, the sompoton is a 'mouth organ' as it contains vibrating reeds. Another difference is that, unlike a flute (which is played only by expelled air), a sompoton can be played by both inhalation and exhalation. In Kota Kinabalu, capital of Sabah, at the Anjung Kinabalu crafts market one is likely to find 'ornamental sompotons' with only two reeds; but at the Sabah Cultural Centre one finds completely functional/playable sompotons with the full complement of 7 reeds. Traditionally, the individual pipes have their own names, such as lombohon, monongkol, suruk, baranat, randawi, tuntuduk and tinangga.

== See also ==
- Keluri
- Khene
- Sheng
- Gourd mouth organ
