= Ploy (musical instrument) =

Cambodian musical instrument

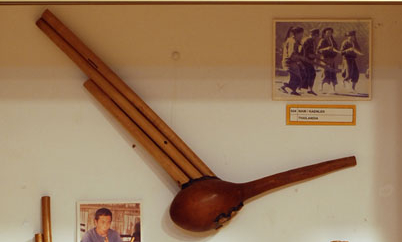
A Cambodian ploy or a regional equivalent.

The ploy (Khmer: ព្លយខ្មែរ) is a Cambodian wind instrument. It is constructed of a gourd body with 5 to 7 bamboo tubes protruding from the body, and a bamboo pipe set at a right angle to the gourd. Musicians blow air in through the bamboo tube, which fills the gourd "wind chest" and exits through the other bamboo tubes. Each of the bamboo sound-tubes has a metal rod inside, that vibrate in the air passing through the tube.

As well as blowing air out of the instrument, the musician can also suck air in, producing a different tone. Notes are produced by covering and uncovering holes cut into the bamboo sound-tubes.

The instrument is primarily rural, found mainly Mondulkiri Province among the Phnoung and Tampuan peoples. The instrument may be related to a Laotian instrument, the khaen.

== Distant origins and relations ==
According to music historian Curt Sachs, the Chinese sheng was originally made with a gourd. Over time the gourd was designed out of the Chinese instruments, but the earlier gourd types continued to exist "in the south and east of Asia." He detailed one in Bengal, a "shêng" that used a bottle-shaped calabash" in which the calabash's neck became the pipe where the player put his mouth. The calabash serves as a "wind chest" and was pierced by the sound pipes.
