= Christopher Adler (musician) =

American composer and pianist

- Born: 1972 (age 53–54); Mountain View, California, U.S.
- Origin: Falls Church, Virginia, U.S.
- Genres: Contemporary classical, experimental
- Occupations: Musician, composer, professor
- Instruments: Khaen, piano, organ
- Years active: 1996–present
- Member of: Silk Road Ensemble, red fish blue fish, Da Capo Chamber Players

Christopher Adler (born 1972) is a musician, composer and music professor at University of San Diego. A virtuoso player of the khaen, a reed instrument native to Laos and Thailand, he has been composing works for the khaen both as a solo instrument and in combination with western instruments since 1996. His works for solo piano include the three-part Bear Woman Dances, commissioned to accompany a dance depicting a Korean creation myth and largely based the Korean musical system nongak. Four of his compositions have been broadcast internationally on WGBH's Art of the States series. His composition for sheng, viola and percussion, Music for a Royal Palace, was commissioned by Carnegie Hall for Yo-Yo Ma's Silk Road Project. An homage to Thailand's Bang Pa-In Palace, the work incorporates traditional Thai melody and embellishments. It was performed at Zankel Hall in 2006 and recorded at the Tanglewood Music Center that same year. His Serpent of Five Tongues for sheng and guanzi (traditional Chinese instruments) premiered at the 2011 MATA Festival.

== Biography ==
Adler was born in Mountain View, California and grew up in Falls Church, Virginia. He developed a connection with music at a young age, playing the pipe organ at the church where his mother worked in Falls Church, (which he would continue to do until his move to San Diego).

He attended Massachusetts Institute of Technology as an undergraduate hoping to major in Mathematics and Physics, but instead earned bachelor's degrees in Mathematics and Composition. One of his mentors there was Professor Evan Ziporyn, who would later be the one to encourage him to play a non-Western instrument. He was first introduced to traditional Thai music, as well as the Khaen specifically, while attending MIT in 1994, during a Smithsonian Folk Life Festival in Washington D.C. He went on to receive his PhD in Composition from Duke University.

Adler has lived in San Diego since 1999 where he is a professor in the Asian Studies and Music departments at the University of San Diego. He also engages in several organizations and festivals that center around contemporary and experimental chamber music.

His wife, Supeena Insee Adler, is also a musician who specializes in traditional Thai music.

== Musical career ==
Adler's works have been performed at Carnegie Hall, Chicago Symphony Center, Tanglewood, Merkin Hall, Shanghai Symphony Hall, the Bang on a Can Marathon, Music at the Anthology, and the Cultural Center of Chicago, the Seoul Arts Center, Sumida Triphony Hall in Tokyo and at new music festivals and universities across the US. by ensembles including the Silk Road Ensemble, red fish blue fish, Ensemble ACJW, the Da Capo Chamber Players. His works have been broadcast and webcast internationally on WGBH's Art of the States, WQXR's Cued Up and BBC Radio 3.

Recordings of Adler's music include:

- Epilogue for a dark day (2004). Tzadik Records
- Ecstatic volutions in a neon haze (2007) Innova Recordings
- A forest of verses: solo and chamber music (2009) Vienna Modern Masters

Adler's retrospective analysis of his first ten years of cross-cultural composition was published in John Zorn's Arcana II: Musicians on Music (Hips Road, 2007).
