= Keluri =

Gourd mouth organ from Sarawak

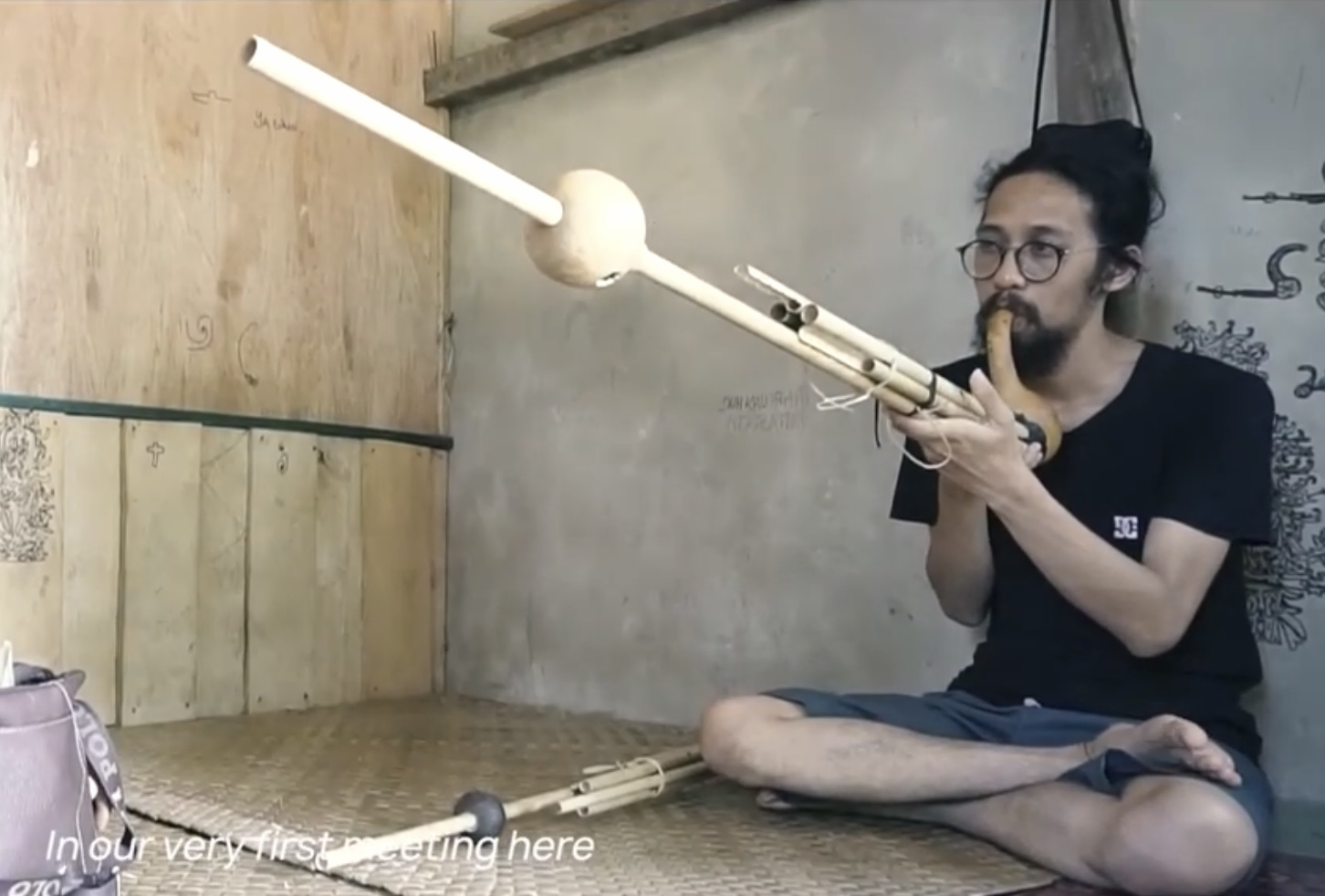
Musician playing kadedek mouth organ, Engkurai, Borneo.

The keluri or keledi or enkulurai (Iban language) is a free reed gourd mouth organ from Sarawak, East Malaysia and Kalimantan made of bamboo and gourd. Historically the keledi or keluri was played by the Orang Ulu people who come from Sarawak, Malaysia, the area northwest of the island of Borneo. Among the Iban people the instrument is called enkulurai. Other peoples that have played the instrument include the Kayan people and Kenyah people. In the 21st century, the instrument has largely disappeared; while not extinct, researchers have had a difficult time finding anyone making or using the instruments.

The instrument is similar to the khaen, played by the Lao people, Thai people and Muong people of Cambodia, Thailand and Vietnam.

== Shapes ==
The Keluri consists of 4-6 bamboo pipes (sizes varying, 75 to 105 cm long) tied together or glued with cerumen and connected to the base, a gourd-shell wind chamber, which has been dried. The wind chamber may be 8 to 15 mm wide. The gourd it is made from may be chosen with a long stem-like section to use as a blow tube, or a 20 cm blow tube can be attached. Each pipe has a free reed made of bamboo or metal. Players control the music by opening and closing fingers on openings at the base of each tube.

The length of the pipes varies by the people making it, although the average is about 2-feet long. The Iban's enkulurai can be as long as 6 feet. The longest pipe in the Iban's instrument has an additional gourd impacted on the tube, which functions to time the pipe, as if it were shorter.

== Use ==
Traditionally, the keluri was used in celebratory events to lead dances and rituals of hunting human heads. Currently this ritual is rarely performed, therefore keluri is also rarely played and made in the area.

One 21st century musical researcher had thought the instrument to be extinct in Kalimantan, on the Indonesian side of the island, until he saw a video from 2014 of young people playing the instruments.

He learned in 2020 of a family still making them in Engkurai Village, Melawi Regency, West Kalimantan. He found that a musician, Pak Bunau, and some of his brothers still make the instrument, calling it the kadedek. The family are of the Dayak people. He found that among these last remaining players, the instrument is used for recreation, relaxation and dancing.

The instrument has been used onstage in Indonesia, by the Balaan Tumaan Ensemble, led by musician and composer Nursalim Yadi Anugerah. The trio performed on stage during "Pekan Komponis Indonesia 2019" (Indonesia Composers Week 2019) organized by the Jakarta Arts Council to support young musicians.

== Tuning ==
An academic paper from 1915 addressed the instrument in a section talking about the tonality of the local music. The instrument is used to make polychordal music and tuned to a pentatonic scale, highest to lowest: C B^{♭} G F E C. The final c is a drone.

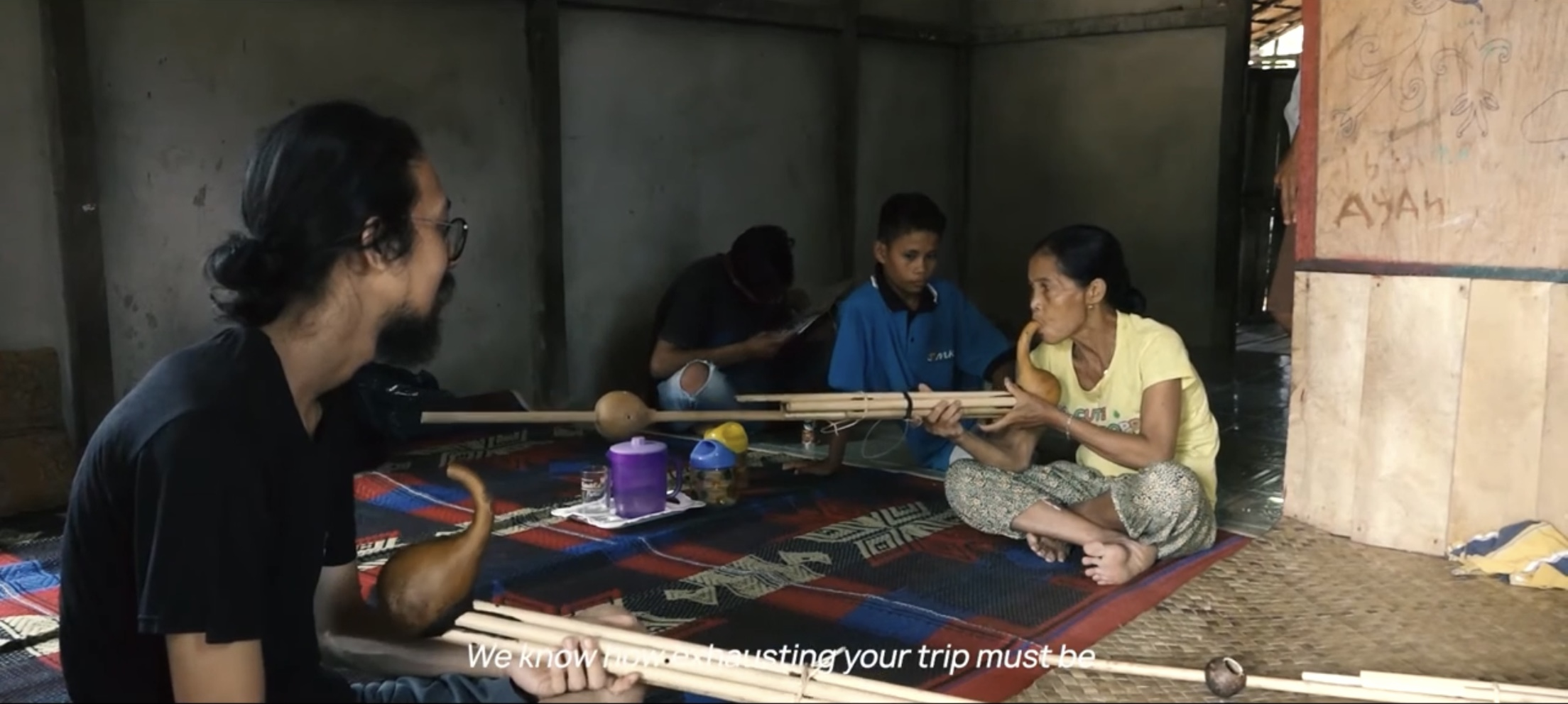
Musicians playing keluri mouth organs, Engkurai, Borneo

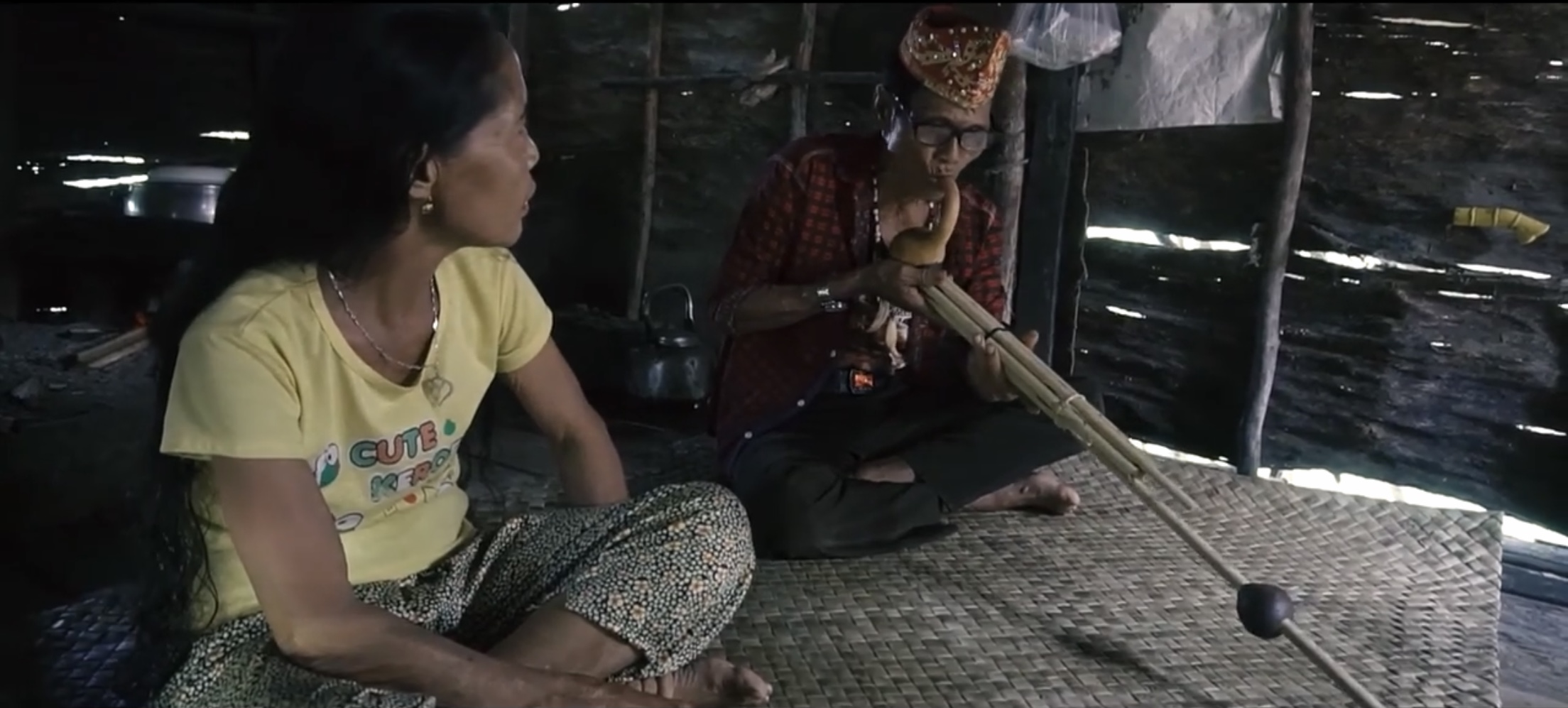
Musician playing kadedek mouth organ, Engkurai, Borneo

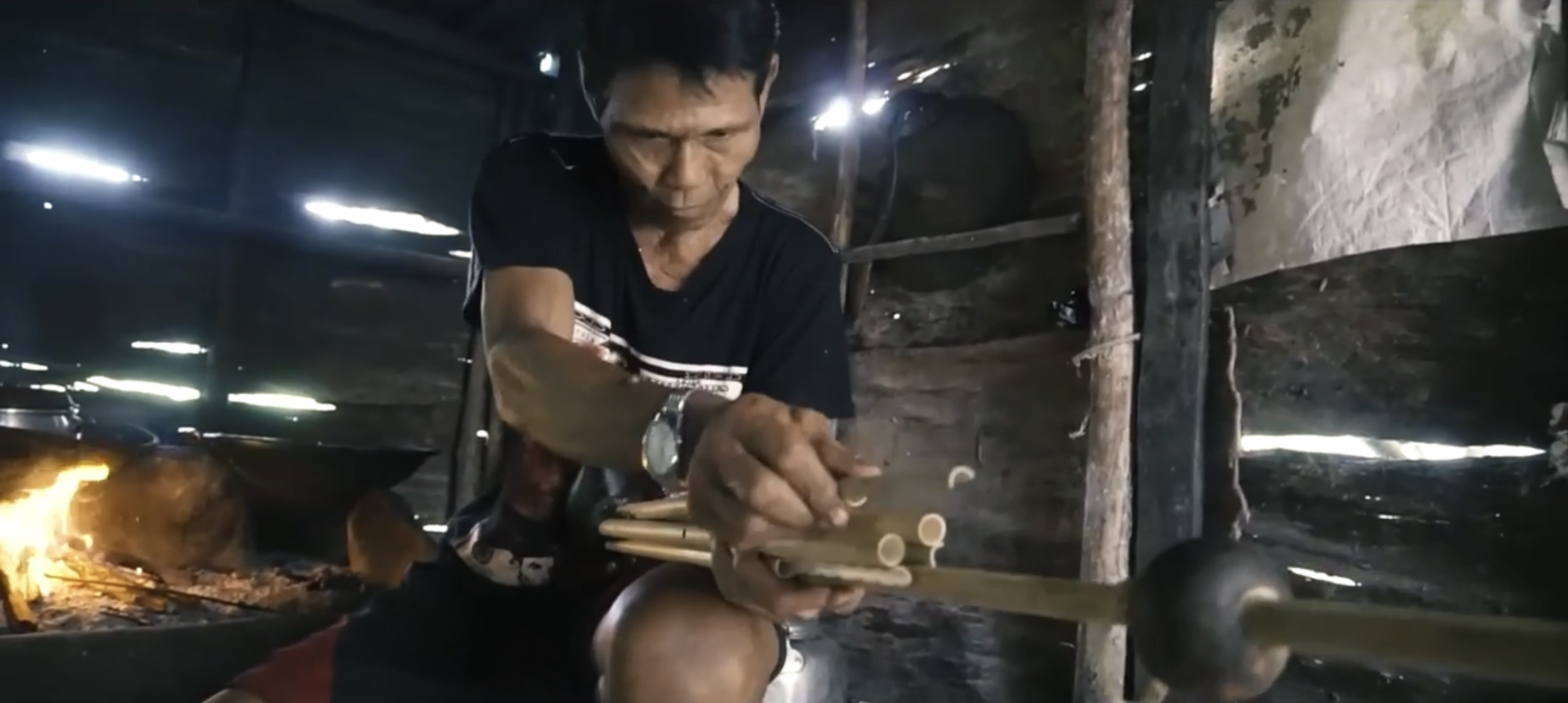
Pak Bunau making kadedek mouth organ, Engkurai village, Borneo.

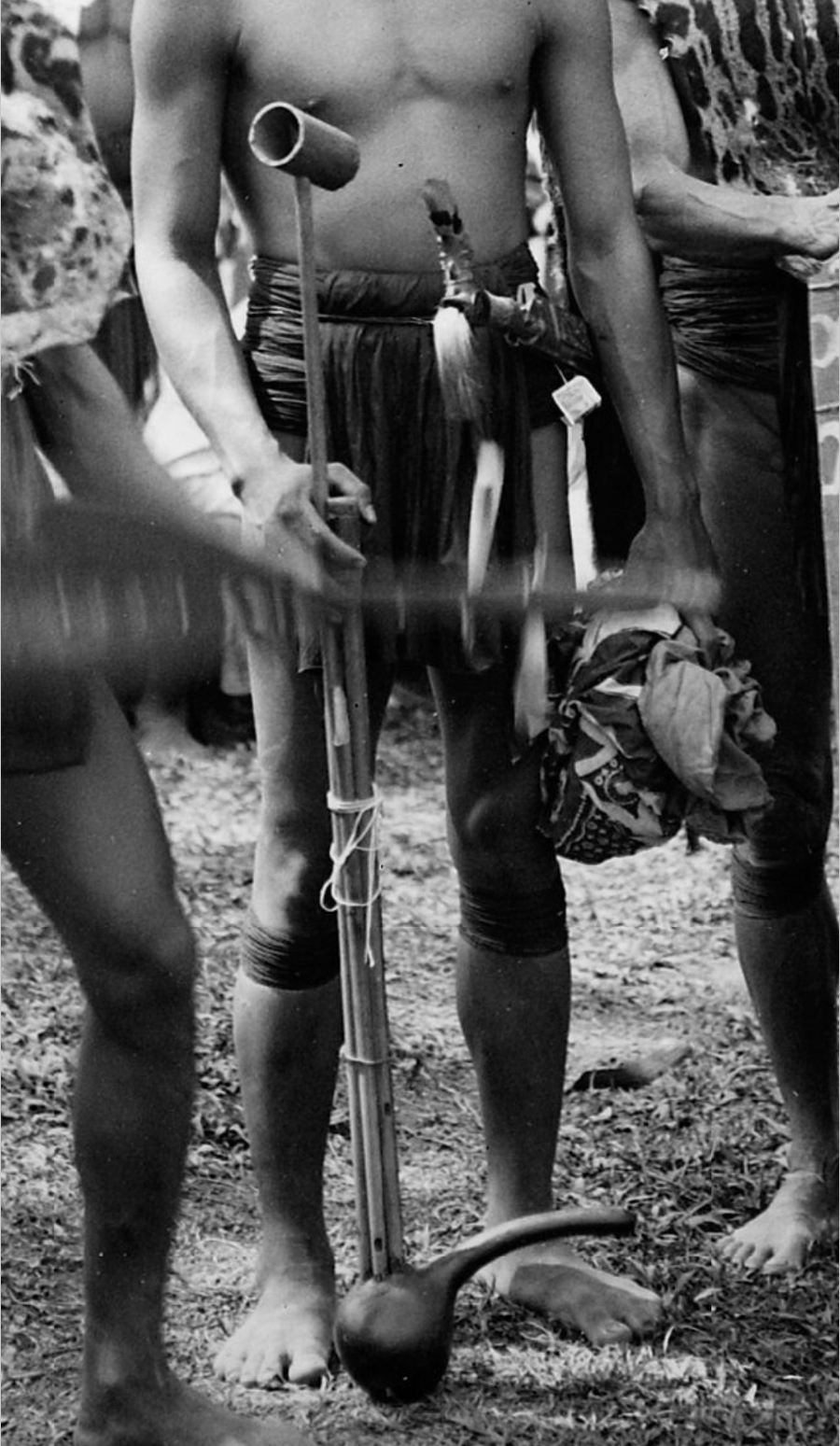
Dayak musician holding mouth organ in Tenggarong, Borneo, early 20th century.

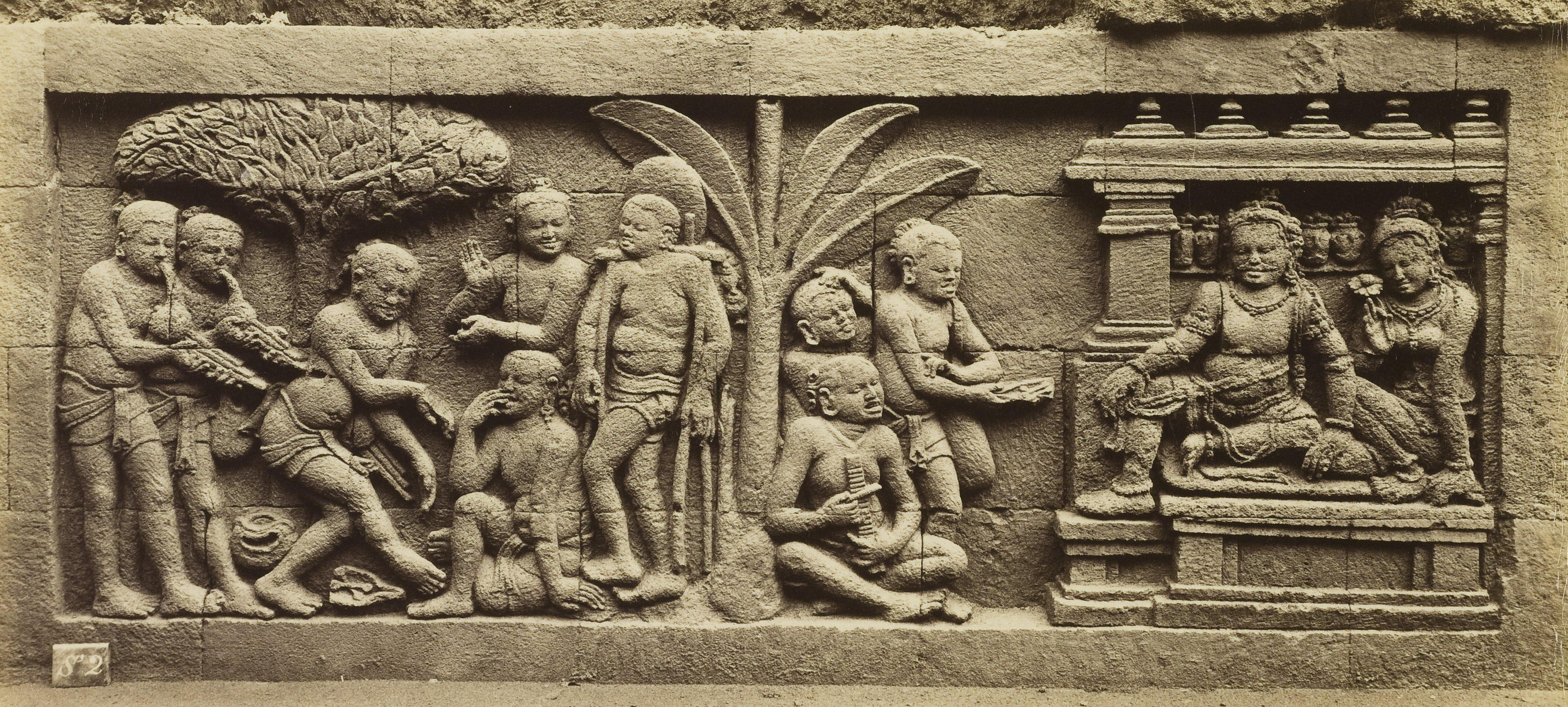
Mouth organs depicted at Borobudur, 9th century C.E.
