= Khaen =

National musical instrument of Laos

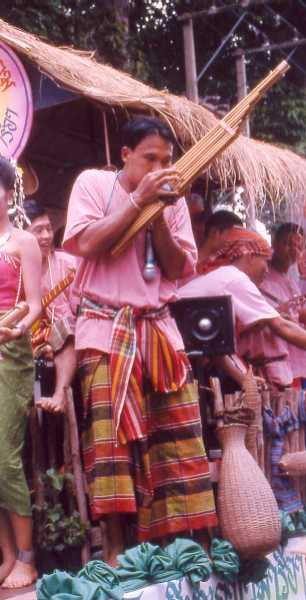
A khaen player in Isan

The khaen (/ˈkɛn/; spelled "khaen", "khene", "kaen", "kehn" or "ken" in English; Lao: ແຄນ, pronounced [kʰɛ́ːn]; Thai: แคน, RTGS: khaen, pronounced [kʰɛ̄ːn]; Northeastern Thai: แคน, pronounced [kʰɛ᷇ːn]; Khmer: គែន – Ken; Vietnamese: khèn or kheng) is a Lao mouth organ whose pipes, which are usually made of bamboo, are connected with a small, hollowed-out hardwood reservoir into which air is blown. The khaen is the national instrument of Laos. Khaen music is an integral part of Lao life that promotes family and social cohesion and it was inscribed in 2017 on the UNESCO Representative List of the Intangible Cultural Heritage of Humanity. It is used among the ethnic Lao Isan and some Tai ethnic groups such as Tai Dam in north Vietnam and Lao population of the province of Stung Treng and is used in lakhon ken, a Cambodian dance drama genre that features the khaen as the main instrument In Vietnam, this instrument is used among the Tai peoples and the Muong people.

The khaen uses a free reed made of brass and/or silver. It is related to Western free-reed instruments such as the harmonium, concertina, accordion, harmonica, and bandoneon, which were developed beginning in the 18th century from the Chinese sheng, a related instrument, a specimen of which had been carried to St. Petersburg, Russia.

The khaen has five different lai, or pentatonic modes with specific drone pitches, organized into two families (thang san and thang yao). The thang san family includes lai sutsanaen (G A C D E), lai po sai (C D F G A), and lai soi (D E G A B), while the thang yao family includes lai yai (A C D E G) and lai noi (D F G A C). Lai po sai is considered to be the oldest of the modes and lai sutsanaen the "Father of the Lai Khaen." Khaen can be played as a solo instrument (dio khene), as part of an ensemble (such as wong pong lang and khene wong), or as an accompaniment to a Lao or Isan solo singer (mor lam). It is often played in combination with a traditional fretted plucked lute called phin.

Composers who have written notated music for the instrument include Annea Lockwood, Christopher Adler, David Loeb, and Vera Ivanova.

== Tuning ==
The khaen has seven tones per octave, with intervals similar to that of the Western diatonic natural A-minor scale: A, B, C, D, E, F, and G. A khaen can be made in a particular key but cannot be tuned after the reed is set and the pipes are cut.

== Varieties ==
The khaen comes in several varieties:

- Khaen hok (Lao: ແຄນຫົກ Thai: แคนหก, hok meaning "six") – small khaen with 12 pipes in two rows of 6; usually used by children or beginners, or sold to tourists
- Khaen jet (Lao: ແຄນເຈັດ Thai: แคนเจ็ด, jet meaning "seven") – medium-sized khaen with 14 pipes in two rows of 7
- Khaen pet (Lao: ແຄນແປດ Thai: แคนแปด, pet meaning "eight") – medium-sized khaen with 16 pipes in two rows of 8; the most commonly used variety
- Khaen gao (Lao: ແຄນເກົ້າ Thai: แคนเก้า, gao meaning "nine") – khaen with 18 pipes in two rows of 9; usually very long
- Khaen sip (Lao: ແຄນສິບ Thai: แคนสิบ, sip meaning "ten") – an "improved" version of the khaen paet; little used

== Outside Southeast Asia ==
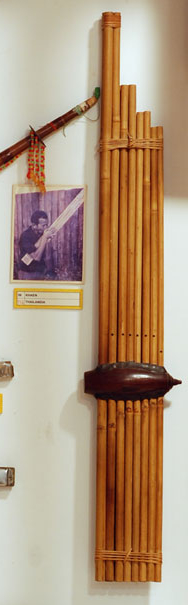
Khaen

In the United States, the top master khaen artist is a blind Laotian-born player, Bounseung Synanonh. Master Synanonh started playing the khaen at age twelve and later lost his eyesight at age 15. He then immigrated to the U.S. as a refugee in the early 1980s. In 1987, he performed for President Reagan at the White House. He also recorded with the World Music Institute under the direction of Terry Miller, an ethnomusicologist. In 2007, he performed at the Smithsonian Folklife Festival in Washington, D.C. In Thailand, one of the top virtuoso khaen soloists is the blind musician Sombat Simla. The instrument has also attracted a few non-Asian performers, including University of San Diego professor Christopher Adler, who also composes for the instrument; British musician Clive Bell; Vancouver-based composer/performer Randy Raine-Reusch (Canada), who played khaen on Aerosmith's Pump (1989), Cranberries' To the Faithful Departed (1996), and Yes's The Ladder (1999); Italian ambient electronic musician Alio Die; and Jaron Lanier (United States). Since the early 21st century, the California-born khaen player Jonny Olsen has achieved familiarity in Laos and Thailand by appearing on numerous Thai and Lao TV Shows and performing live concerts in Thailand and the U.S. Olsen is the first foreigner to win a khaen championship in Khon Kaen, Thailand in 2005. Stephen Molyneux (United States) has played the khaen on his releases The Arbitrary State (2010), The Stars Are the Light Show (2012), Wings and Circles (2016), and in select live performances. Molyneux bought a khaen in Bangkok in 2010 after developing an interest in the instrument while traveling in Laos and Thailand.

== Bibliography ==
- Miller, Terry E. Traditional Music of the Lao: Kaen Playing and Mawlum Singing in Northeast Thailand (1985). Contributions in Intercultural and Comparative Studies, no. 13. Westport, Connecticut: Greenwood Press.
- Miller, Terry E. An Introduction to Playing the Kaen (1980). Kent, Ohio: Terry E. Miller.
- Lilly, Joseph An Introduction to the Khaen of Laos:The Free-Reed Journal Articles and Essays Featuring Classical Free-Reed Instruments and Performers

== See also ==
- Water organ
- Sompoton
- Ploong
- Sheng (instrument)
- Lusheng
- Gourd mouth organ
