= Saenghwang =

Traditional Korean reed organ instrument

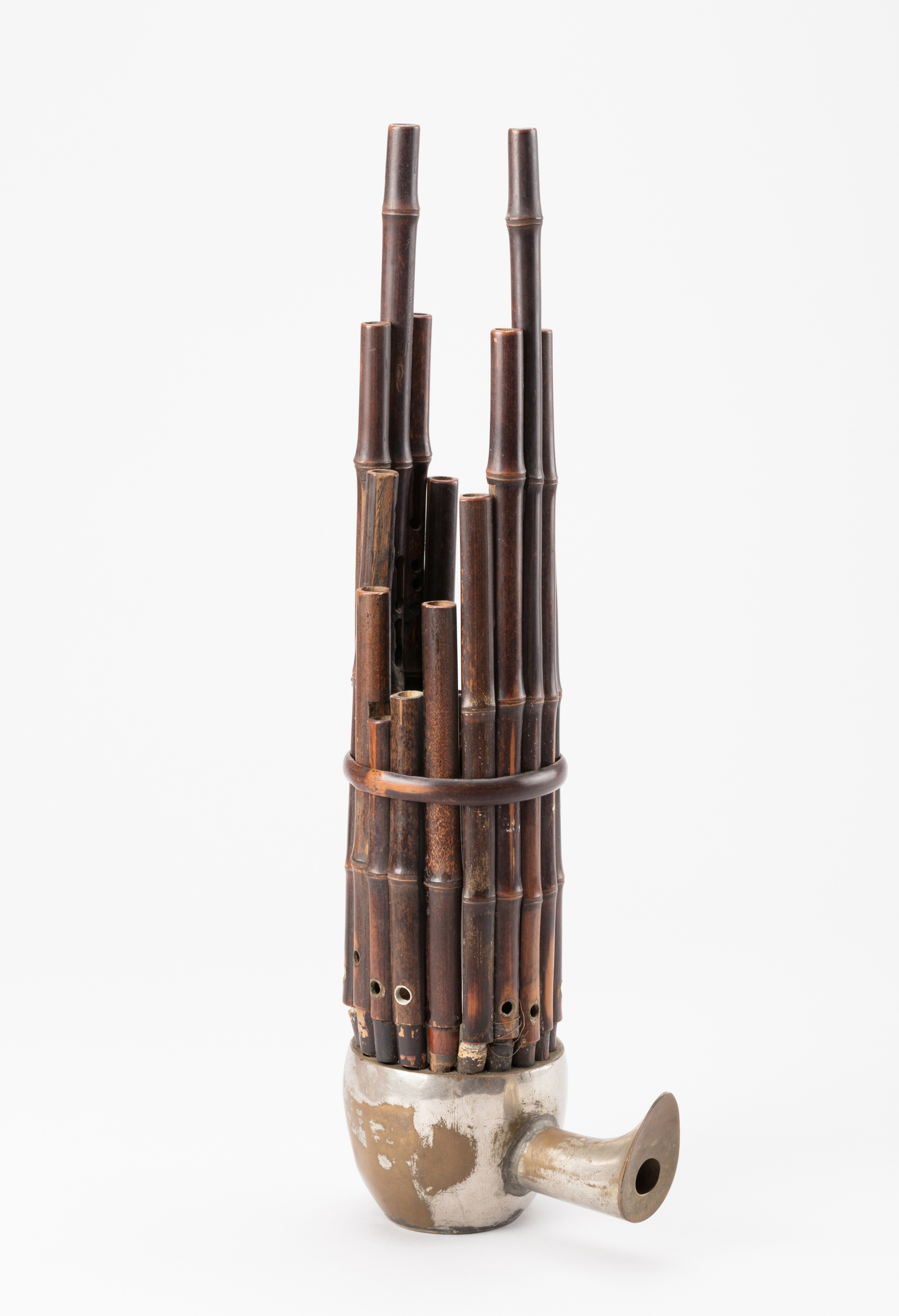

Korean name
- Hangul: 생황
- Hanja: 笙簧
- RR: saenghwang
- MR: saenghwang

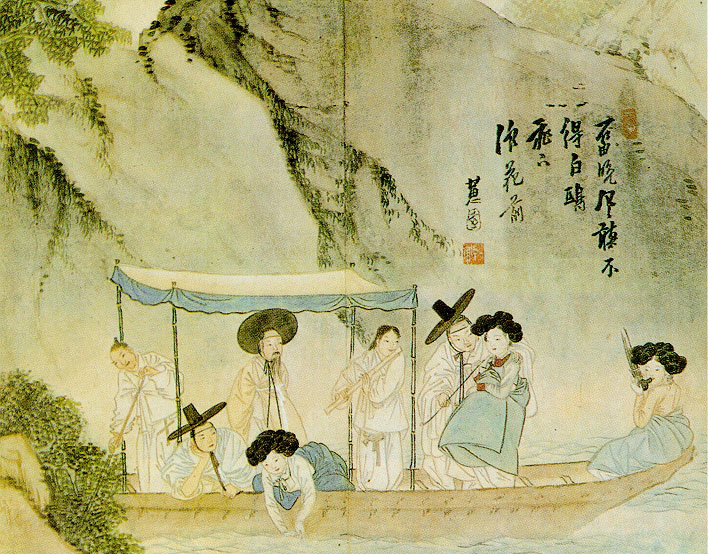
A gisaeng playing a saenghwang (far right). The painting is from the Hyewon pungsokdo (1805).

The saenghwang (Korean: 생황) is a traditional Korean wind instrument. It is a free reed mouth organ derived from the Chinese sheng. It is related to the Japanese instrument shō, which is also derived from the sheng.

The instrument was referred to historically as saeng (생; 笙) or u (우) during the Goryeo period.

== History ==
It is attested to in Korea during the Three Kingdoms of Korea period. Sheng were continually brought to Korea, with the Goryeo court receiving it from the Song dynasty in 1116. In 1406, the Yongle Emperor of the Ming dynasty gave the Joseon court a sheng. Under the reign of Sejong the Great, the instrument was manufactured in Korea.

During the 1592–1598 Japanese invasions of Korea, the instrument temporarily ceased to be manufactured in Korea. It continued to be played into the Japanese colonial period, with artists eventually joining the National Gugak Center after the establishment of South Korea. The South Korean government has sponsored some artists who play the instrument.

== Description ==
It is constructed from 17 bamboo pipes, each with a metal free reed, mounted vertically in a windchest. Traditionally the saenghwang's windchest was made out of a dried gourd but it is now more commonly made of metal or wood.

The range is from hwangjong (黃: E♭) to cheongnam-ryo (湳: C). Excluding the ui-gwan, the 16 coffins produced 12-yul and 4 auditory sounds, but since they began to be used for hyangak, they have a wider range. It is the only polyphonic musical instrument among Korean traditional instruments. Usually, 3 notes are produced simultaneously, 2 notes are octave, and 1 note 4 or 5 degrees below.

Gisaeng (Korean female entertainers) are often depicted playing saenghwang in old Korean paintings.

In contrast to other Korean traditional instruments, it is not well known today, even in Korea, and very few musicians are able to play it. It is used primarily in chamber music, usually in combination with instruments such as the danso (vertical flute) and yanggeum (hammered dulcimer).

== See also ==
- Korean music
- Sheng (instrument)
- Shō
