= Ploong =

Musical instrument of the Mru people

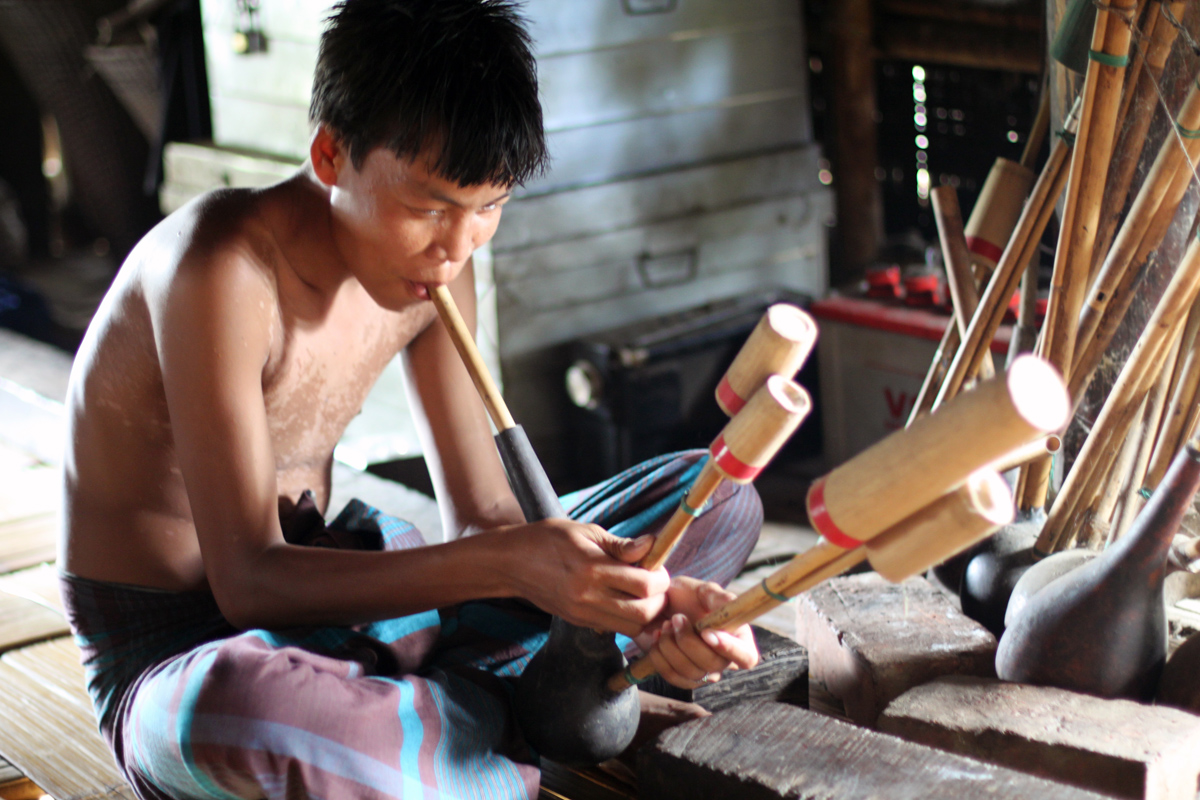
A Mru young man playing a ploong

A ploong (or plung) is a musical instrument of the Mru (or Murung) people, who inhabit the Chittagong Hill Tracts of Bangladesh and also in Burma. It is a mouth organ made from gourds and bamboo and is of varying sizes. The largest ploong has eight long pipes; its sound has been compared to a bagpipe or electronic organ.

== See also ==
- Mru people
- Khaen
