= Vera Ivanova =

Russian composer

Vera Ivanova (born 1977, Moscow) is a Russian composer.

== Life ==
She studied music at the Central Music School, studying composition, music theory and the piano, from 1984 to 1995. She studied at the Tchaikovsky Conservatory where she studied with Roman Ledenyov. She studied at the Guildhall School of Music and Drama, with Allessandro Timossi, then at the Eastman School of Music, with David Liptak.

She teaches at Chapman University.

== Awards ==
Vera Ivanova is the recipient of several awards. She won honorable mention at the Bourges International Electroacoustic Music Competition, and the third prize at the 2001 Salzburg Mozart Competition. She also received a prize at the ASCAP Morton Gould Young Composers Awards, the Hanson Orchestra prize of the Eastman School of Music in 2003, and the André Chevillion - Yvonne Bonnaud Prize at the 2008 Orléans International Piano Competition.

== Works ==
- Chamber Concerto (1996-97), for 2 pianos
- Concerto for piano and orchestra (1999)
- Confession (2001), for solo violin
- Panic-Melancholy (2001), electroacoustic music
- Variations on chords: Distances (2003), for symphony orchestra
- Aftertouch (2005), for piano
- Still Images of the Restless Mind (2006), for chamber orchestra
- "Great Waves" from "Sea: the Soul of Spain" (2007), song cycle
- Quiet Light (2009), for solo violin
- Aura (2011), for solo clarinet
- Three Summer Songs (2011), for SSAA a cappella choir
- 6 Fugitive Memories (2015), for piano
- May Day (2015), for TTBB a cappella choir
- Sagittarius (2015), mixed quintet
- In the Deep Heart's Core (2017), for piano, fixed audio, and optional projection
- Children's Games (2018), for mixed quintet
- If You Were Coming in the Fall (2019), for choir
- i-sola (2020), for piano
- What Remains After the Dust (2020), for piano
- The Double (2022), chamber opera
- Karkata (2022), for piano
