= List of Mongolian musical instruments =

Instruments of western origin, such as piano and trumpet, are excluded.

== History ==
After the 6th century BC it is known that people of Mongolian ethnicity played stringed instruments. The most ancient instrument is probably the tsuur, which is shown in cave wall paintings dated to the 4th or 3rd millennium BC. Other instruments were adopted or modified from instruments in use from neighboring countries, or from conquered countries (for example the Hun/Xioungnu empire 200 BC - 600 and the Mongolian empire between the 12th and 18th century founded by Genghis Khaan). Before the democratic revolution in 1911 several instruments had been restricted to noblemen or for use in monastery ceremonies. The yatga especially wasn't allowed to commoners if the number of strings exceeded eight; only at court could the eleven or twelve stringed yatga be played.

In contrast most of the Mongolic ethnicities adopted four instruments for folk music and other oral performances: the tovshuur, huuchir, morin khuur and the tsuur. Nowadays some ethnicities changed from the tovshuur to the shanz.

In modern times some instruments have been adapted like the 21-stringed yatga (about 10 strings added), the morin khuur (modification of the sound box and string material) - or invented in the 1960s for completing orchestras like the "ih huur", a horse headed double bass, also having a trapezoid sound box.

== Instruments ==
Most of these instruments had been modified during the 1940s and 1960, for standardization during the communist period in Mongolia and the time after the cultural revolution in China. That means many instruments have a "modernized" shape, different materials, changed construction details. The traditional shape and the modernized shape is often mentioned in the detail articles.

Examples: The traditional morin khuur had mostly a skinned top and bottom, and sound holes at the sides. It was modernized in creating a wooden sound box, holes and the soundpost. The traditional Yatga had about 8-13 strings but the modernized shape has 21 Strings or 23 Strings. Mostly all strings of the bowed instruments were made from horse hair, and the plucked instruments had silk or gut strings. Nowadays only the bows have horse hair, but the strings are made from nylon (Morin Khuur, other bowed instruments) or steel (Dulcimer/Yochin, Shanz, Yatga)

=== Plucked ===
- Shanz, Shudraga (Mongolian:ᠱᠠᠨᠵᠠ/ᠱᠤᠳᠤᠷᠭᠤ)- a plucked three string instrument, widespread across Asia. In Okinawa of Japan known as sanshin, in China as sanxian, in Mongolian Shanz or Shudarga and Vietnam known as đàn tam. The shanz is commonly used in short folk songs in Mongolia.
- Tovshuur, Topshur (Mongolian:ᠲᠣᠪᠰᠢᠭᠤᠷ/Tobsigur; Khalkha dialect: Tovshuur; Kalmyk: Topshur; Altai: Topshur) - a two stringed and skinned instrument made from a 4-foot long spoon-alike nomad tool for airag making, especially popular in Oirat territories. All tovshuur are homemade and because of this, the materials and shape of the tovshuur vary depending on the builder and the region. For example, depending on the tribe, the string might be made of horsehair or sheep intestine. The body of the tovshuur is bowl shaped and usually covered in tight animal skin. Also this musical instrument originated from ancient nomads. This musical instrument is much forgotten today in Mongolia.
- Yatga - a plucked zither which is used in two sizes nowadays:
  - (Master Yatug-a) (Mongolian:ᠶᠠᠲᠤᠭ᠎ᠠ) - usually equipped with 21 strings, sometimes 23 strings. It is related to and bears influence from the Chinese guzheng.
  - (Mongolian:ᠶᠠᠲᠤᠭ᠎ᠠ) - closer to the historical shape, commonly with 11-15 strings and a smaller body.

=== Bowed ===
- Morin khuur (Mongolian:ᠮᠣᠷᠢᠨ ᠬᠣᠭᠣᠷ/морин хуур) - the national instrument of Mongolia. It is a typical Mongolian two-stringed instrument. The body and the neck are carved from wood. The end of the neck has the form of a horse's head, and the sound is similar to that of a violin or a cello. The strings are made of horsetail hair. It is played with a willow bow, strung with horsetail hair, and coated with larch or cedar resin.
- Ikh khuur - (их хуур) A two or three (sometimes 4) stringed bass with a horse's head and trapezoid sound box, a hybrid of a morin khuur and a double bass.
- Khuuchir - (хуучир) a bowed, two- or four-stringed instrument with a small sound box. It's considered the precursor to the Chinese huqin instruments including the erhu.
- Temeen khur: camel's head fiddle

=== Struck ===
- Yoochin (Mongolian:ᠶᠣᠣᠴᠢᠨ/ёочин) - hammered dulcimer of varying strings struck using two bamboo hammers, related to the Chinese yangqin.

=== Wind ===
- Tsuur (Mongolian:ᠴᠤᠭᠤᠷ/цуур) - end blown flute without mouthpiece, mostly made from light wood, like bamboo, other materials:
- Buree class (Mongolian: "бүрээ" "ᠪᠦᠷᠦ᠌") - clarinet style of blown instruments
  - Ever Buree - (Mongolian: "эвэр бүрээ") - horn-shaped clarinet
  - Bayalag Buree - (Mongolian: "баялаг бүрээ" ) - straight clarinet.
  - Hiidiin buree - long and deep as an alp horn.
  - Tsagaan buree - Mongolian seashells.
- Limbe - (Mongolian:ᠯᠢᠩᠪᠦ/лимбэ) - end blown flute with a mouthpiece.
- Bishguur (Mongolian:ᠪᠢᠰᠬᠢᠭᠦᠷ/бишгүүр) - oboe like in appearance with a double reed, a long hardwood body and copper or brass bell.

=== Other ===
Ancient Traditional String Instruments and Flute Instrument.

=== Percussion ===
- Shigshuur - ancient rattle having misty energy, made from a cow horn carved into the shape of a raven's head.
- Gong / Tam tam class
  - big metal gong, also known as Tam Tam
  - 9 little gong frame
  - monastery drum - formerly used for liturgy purposes
  - Orchestra drum
- Tuur - frame drum
- Tsan - cymbal
- Denshig - small bells
- Damar - small drums used in monasteries, a wooden casing with resemblance to a coil. On both outer surfaces it is coated with leather. In the middle of the coil there is a band made from silk with embroidery and two buttons attached to a string. By moving back and forth, these two buttons are hit on the stretched leather of this small drum.

== Playing contexts ==
- Богино дуу - short songs

Smaller ensembles of both traditional and contemporary style are known to play on various classical instruments.

- Уртын дуу - long songs

Only accompanied with the morin khuur.

- Биелгээ - dance music

Only accompanied with the morin huur, mostly performed in yurts with imitating daily tasks of the nomads life.

- Татлага - imitating solo pieces

Played on the morin khuur, Igil huur, tovshuur and shanz.

- Ulger, magtaal, domog - магтаал - praisal, домог, үлгэр, туул - legends, (folk) tales played only with the morin huur or the huuchir. The most often recited magtaal is "Huhuu Namjil", the legend of the creation of the morin khuur, and the Jangar - an epic that endures for three days. The Mongolian minority in Xinyang (China) celebrate it every year in August.
- Ерөөл-Wishspelling

Mostly recited without instruments, or rarely with the morin huur.

- Contemporary orchestral music

Beginning with the Russian occupation between 1926 and 1990 various attempts have been made to build orchestras. Large orchestras had been unknown in the ancient history of Mongolia, but the popularity of Mongolian orchestra pieces still exists in the 21st century. Many orchestral pieces exist, as well as some smaller dance arrangements.

Mongolian composers have a standard ensemble: 17x shanz, 14x yatga, 11x morin khuur, 5x yoochin, 2x ih huur, 1x triangle, 7x huuchir, 4x durvun chikh, 1x gong, 2x drums, 1x monastery trumpet, 2 big and 6 small flutes, 6x buree, 2x ever buree.

- Contemporary composers:
  - Sharav
  - Natsagiin Jantsannorov
  - Chuluun

== See also ==
- Music of Mongolia
- Traditional Korean musical instruments
