= Chanzy (instrument) =

Musical instrument

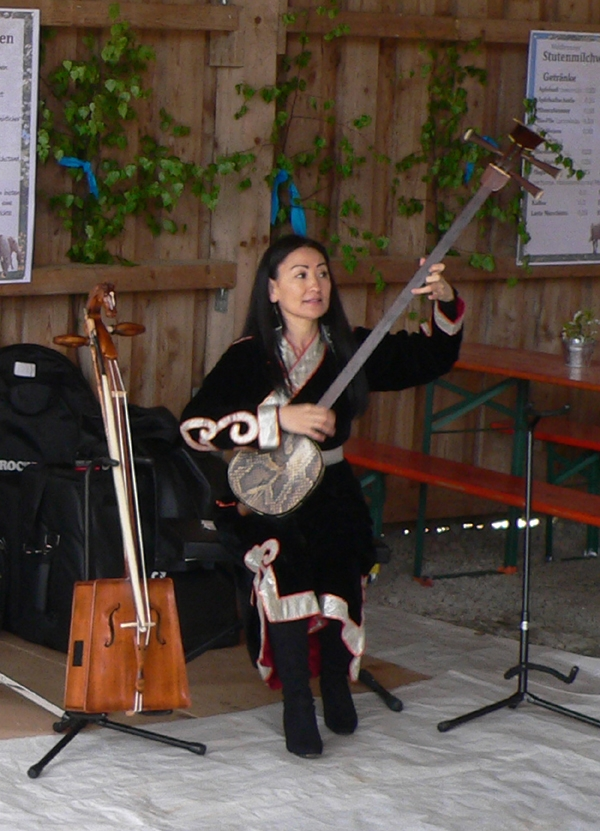

String instrument
- Other names: Chanzi, Tyanzi
- Hornbostel–Sachs classification: 321.322
- Developed: Tuva..

Related instruments
- Shanz, Shamisen, Sanxian, Doshpuluur, Topshur

A chanzy (also spelled chanzi or tyanzi) (Tuvan: чанзы) is a three-stringed lute instrument from the Tuvan Republic. It looks like a long-necked banjo with a skin head (goat or snake skin) glued over a heart or kidney-shaped wooden hoop body. The neck is (660 mm) long and made of pine wood. Some models have frets, others not or only drawn on. Usually it has two similar sound-holes and some painted decoration. It is most commonly used to accompany throat singing. Like on the doshpuluur the three (nylon) strings are tuned by modern guitar tuners, the extra long tuning pegs, on some instruments, are just for decoration. Often the peg-head has a carving of a horse head (very common on instruments around Mongolia). It produces a louder tone than the doshpuluur, and is commonly used throughout Central Asia.

The 3 guitar-strings run over a rather large loose bridge on the skin to a wooden string-holder, which is fixed with a rope to a pin on the bottom of the body. It has nylon strings and it can be tuned F2, C3, F3 or D2, A2, D3, or C2, G2, C3; from the top string to the bottom one. The top and the middle strings have a fifth between them. The middle and bottom strings have a fourth between them. Therefore, the top and bottom strings have an octave between them.

The chanzy is played strumming - by sweeping the thumb or a plectrum up or down across the strings - (usually only the first string is fingered, the other string(s) are drones), to accompany Overtone singing.

Kongar-ool Borisovich Ondar was a master Soviet and Russian Tuvan throat singer who also played the chanzy.

== See also ==
- Listen to Choduraa Tumat performs songs with khoomei and chanzy
