= Hun (album) =

2026 studio album by the Hu

Studio album by The Hu
- Released: 24 July 2026
- Studios: Nature Sound Studio, Ulaanbaatar, Mongolia
- Genre: Folk metal
- Length: 50:30
- Language: Mongolian
- Label: Better Noise
- Producer: B. Dashdondog

The Hu chronology
Live at Glastonbury (2024)	Hun (2026)

Singles from Hun
- 1. "Lost Soul (feat. Jonny Hawkins)" Released: 20 May 2026

Professional ratings
Review scores
Source	Rating
Blabbermouth.net	7.5/10
Distorted Sound Mag	7/10
Kerrang!	4/5
Metal Hammer	3.5/5 stars

Hun (Хүн, Human in Mongolian) is the third studio album by the Mongolian folk metal band the Hu, released by Better Noise Music on 24 July 2026. Six songs were showcased from the album ahead of its full release; the lead single "Lost Soul", along with five other promotional songs and singles "The Real You", "The Men", "Warrior Chant", "Grey Hun", and "Horsemen".

== Background and recording ==
On 23 January 2026, The Hu released their first promotional single "The Real You". On 20 March 2026, they released two more promotional singles "The Men" and "Warrior Chant". The Hu announced their third studio album, Hun, on 20 May 2026 as well as the release of the lead single "Lost Soul" featuring Jonny Hawkins of Nothing More. On 26 June 2026, they released the fourth promotional single "Grey Hun". On 24 July 2026, they released the studio album Hun and the album's fifth and final promotional single "Horsemen".

As with their previous studio albums, Hun was recorded at Nature Sound Studio in Ulaanbaatar, Mongolia.

== Track listing ==
Vinyl and CD versions contain an album version of Lost Soul, while streaming services use the single version featuring Jonny Hawkins instead.

All songs are composed and produced by B. Dashdondog a.k.a. Dashka, except where indicated.

Hun track listing
No.	Title	Mongolian title	Length
1.	"Warrior Chant"	Дайчны мөргөл	3:46
2.	"Lost Soul"	Төөрөлдсөн сүнс	3:53
3.	"The Men"	Эр хүн	3:41
4.	"Echoes of My Father"	Аавын дурсамж	6:08
5.	"Shadow"	Сүүдэр	3:21
6.	"Horsemen"	Төвөргөөн	4:35
7.	"Greed"	Шунал	5:01
8.	"The Real You"	Чи бишээ	4:01
9.	"Grey Hun"	Саарал хүн	3:50
10.	"Universe"	Орших үчүй	8:43
11.	"Second Face"	Хоёр нүүрт	3:31
Total length:			50:30

== Personnel ==
The Hu

- B. Enkhsaikhan aka "Enkush" – gal morin khuur
- Ts. Galbadrakh aka "Gala" – ayanga morin khuur, throat singing
- G. Nyamjantsan aka "Jaya" – tumur khuur, tsuur, throat singing
- N. Temuulen aka "Temka" – baigali tovshuur, programming
- A. Jambaldorj "Jamba" – Mongolian guitar
- B. Nyamdavaa "Davaa" – guitars, bass
- G. Odbayar "Odko" – drums
- M. Unumunkh "Unu" – hengereg percussion

== Charts ==
Chart performance for Hun
Chart (2026)	Peak position
Swiss Albums (Schweizer Hitparade)	43
UK Album Downloads (Official Charts)	10
UK Independent Albums (Official Charts)	30
UK Rock & Metal Albums (Official Charts)	21
