= Live at Glastonbury =

2024 live album by the Hu

Live album by The Hu
- Released: 7 June 2024
- Recorded: 25 June 2023
- Venue: Glastonbury Festival 2023
- Genre: Folk metal
- Length: 55:45
- Language: Mongolian
- Label: Better Noise
- Producers: B. Dashdondog; The Hu

The Hu chronology
Rumble of Thunder (2022)	Live at Glastonbury (2024)	Hun (2026)

Singles from Live at Glastonbury
- 1. "Tatar Warrior" Released: 2024

Live at Glastonbury is the first live album by the Mongolian folk metal band the Hu, released by Better Noise Music on digital download and streaming media platforms on 07 June 2024, and on CD and vinyl formats on 21 June 2024. The album was recorded at the band's appearance at the Glastonbury Festival 2023 on 25 June 2023.

== Track listing ==
All tracks are written by B. Dashdondog a.k.a. Dashka, except where indicated.

No.	Title	Writer(s)	Cyrillic title	Length
1.	"Shihi Hutu"		Шихи Хуту	7:13
2.	"The Gereg"	The Hu; Dashdondog	Гэрэг (Gereg)	5:13
3.	"Shoog Shoog"	The Hu; Dashdondog	Шөөг шөөг (Shöög shöög)	4:08
4.	"Eseerin Vasahina"			3:01
5.	"Tatar Warrior"		Татар дайчин	4:55
6.	"Upright Destined Mongol"		Босоо заяат Монгол	4:49
7.	"Black Thunder"		Хар аянга	7:12
8.	"Through the Never"	James Hetfield; Lars Ulrich; Kirk Hammett		4:39
9.	"Yuve Yuve Yu"	The Hu; Dashdondog	Юу вэ юу вэ юу? (Yuu ve yuu ve yuu?)	5:00
10.	"Wolf Totem"	The Hu; Dashdondog	Чонон сүлд (Chonon süld)	5:38
11.	"This Is Mongol"		Монгол билээ	4:20
Total length:				55:45

== Personnel ==
The Hu

- B. Enkhsaikhan a.k.a. "Enkush" – gal morin khuur
- Ts. Galbadrakh a.k.a. "Gala" – ayanga morin khuur, throat singing
- G. Nyamjantsan a.k.a. "Jaya" – tumur khuur, tsuur, throat singing
- N. Temuulen a.k.a. "Temka" – baigali tovshuur, programming
- A. Jambaldorj "Jamba" – Mongolian guitar, recording
- B. Nyamdavaa "Davaa" – electric guitar, bass guitar
- G. Odbayar "Odko" – drums
- M. Unumunkh "Unu" – hengereg percussion
