= Rumble of Thunder =

2022 studio album by the Hu

Studio album by The Hu
- Released: 2 September 2022
- Recorded: 2019–2022
- Studio: Nature Sound Studio, Ulaanbaatar, Mongolia
- Genre: Folk metal
- Length: 63:51
- Language: Mongolian
- Label: Better Noise
- Producer: B. Dashdondog

The Hu chronology
The Gereg (2019)	Rumble of Thunder (2022)	Live at Glastonbury (2024)

Singles from Rumble of Thunder
- 1. "This Is Mongol" Released: 2022; 2. "Black Thunder" Released: 8 July 2022; 3. "Bii Biyelgee" Released: 2 September 2022

Rumble of Thunder is the second studio album by the Mongolian folk metal band the Hu, released by Better Noise Music on 2 September 2022. It was announced on 8 July 2022 upon the release of the single "Black Thunder". A deluxe edition featuring bonus tracks was released on 30 June 2023.

The album was ranked by Metal Hammer as the 15th most anticipated metal release of 2022.

== Track listing ==
All songs are composed and produced by B. Dashdondog a.k.a. Dashka, except where indicated.

Rumble of Thunder track listing
No.	Title	Cyrillic title	Length
1.	"This Is Mongol"	Монгол билээ	3:44
2.	"Yut Hövende"	Юүт Хөвэндэ	5:34
3.	"Triangle"	Учиртай гурав	4:12
4.	"Teach Me"	Надад заа	3:58
5.	"Upright Destined Mongol"	Босоо заяат Монгол	4:49
6.	"Sell the World"	Дэлхийгээ зар	4:23
7.	"Black Thunder"	Хар аянга	4:15
8.	"Mother Nature"	Байгаль эх	6:57
9.	"Bii Biyelgee"	Бие биелгээ	4:18
10.	"Segee"	Сэгээ	4:39
11.	"Shihi Hutu"	Шихи Хуту	7:09
12.	"Tatar Warrior"	Татар дайчин	5:03
Total length:			63:51

Spotify/Apple Music bonus track
No.	Title	Length
13.	"Black Thunder" (Extended)	8:59
Total length:		68:07

Deluxe Edition bonus tracks
No.	Title	Lyrics	Length
13.	"This Is Mongol (Warrior Souls)" (featuring William DuVall of Alice in Chains)	Dashdondog; DuVall	3:41
14.	"Black Thunder" (featuring Serj Tankian and DL from Bad Wolves)	Dashdondog; Blair Daly; Scott Stevens	4:28
15.	"Mother Nature" (featuring LP)	Dashdondog; Laura Pergolizzi	4:33

Deluxe Edition digital release bonus tracks
No.	Title	Lyrics	Length
13.	"Black Thunder" (Extended)		8:59
14.	"This Is Mongol (Warrior Souls)" (featuring William DuVall of Alice in Chains)	Dashdondog; DuVall	3:41
15.	"Black Thunder" (featuring Serj Tankian and DL from Bad Wolves)	Dashdondog; Daly; Stevens	4:28
16.	"Mother Nature" (featuring LP)	Dashdondog; Pergolizzi	4:33
17.	"Bii Biyelgee" (Acoustic)		5:12
18.	"Black Thunder" (Acoustic)		4:53
19.	"This Is Mongol" (Acoustic)		3:32
20.	"Mother Nature" (Acoustic)		6:04
Total length:			1:40:23

== Personnel ==
The Hu

- B. Enkhsaikhan aka "Enkush" – gal morin khuur
- Ts. Galbadrakh aka "Gala" – ayanga morin khuur, throat singing
- G. Nyamjantsan aka "Jaya" – tumur khuur, tsuur, throat singing
- N. Temuulen aka "Temka" – baigali tovshuur, programming
- A. Jambaldorj "Jamba" – Mongolian guitar
- B. Nyamdavaa "Davaa" – guitars, bass
- G. Odbayar "Odko" – drums
- M. Unumunkh "Unu" – hengereg percussion

Production

- B. Temuujin – creative management
- B. Dashdondog aka "Dashka" (Dashka Productions, Ulaanbaatar) – programming, recording
- A. Erkhemtuguldur aka "Erkhemee" (GV Studio, Ulaanbaatar) – drum recording
- A. Jambaldorj "Jamba" – recording
- Jerry Chua (MYX Music Studios, Singapore) – mixing
- Howie Weinberg (Weinberg Mastering, Los Angeles) – mastering

== Charts ==
Chart performance for Rumble of Thunder
Chart (2022)	Peak position
Austrian Albums (Ö3 Austria)	38
German Albums (Offizielle Top 100)	38
Scottish Albums (OCC)	18
Swiss Albums (Schweizer Hitparade)	18
UK Independent Albums (OCC)	4
UK Rock & Metal Albums (OCC)	3
