= The Gereg =

Studio album by The Hu
- Released: September 13, 2019
- Recorded: 2018–2019
- Studio: Nature Sound Studio, Ulaanbaatar, Mongolia
- Genre: Folk metal
- Length: 47:42
- Language: Mongolian
- Label: Eleven Seven
- Producer: The Hu; B. Dashdondog

The Hu chronology
The Gereg (2019)	Rumble of Thunder (2022)

Singles from The Gereg
- 1. "Yuve Yuve Yu" Released: 2018; 2. "Wolf Totem" Released: 2018; 3. "Shoog Shoog" Released: 2019; 4. "The Great Chinggis Khaan" Released: 2019; 5. "Song of Women" Released: 2020

The Gereg (Mongolian: Гэрэгэ) is the debut album by Mongolian folk metal band the Hu, released on September 13, 2019. The album takes its name from the diplomatic passport carried by Mongolian nobles and officials during the 13th century.

A Deluxe Edition of the album was released on July 10, 2020, featuring guest vocals by Jacoby Shaddix, From Ashes to New, and Lzzy Hale, as well as acoustic versions of three tracks.

Loudwire named it one of the 50 best rock albums of 2019.

== Track listing ==
All tracks are written by The Hu and B. Dashdondog, except where indicated.

CD
No.	Title	Mongolian title	Length
1.	"The Gereg"	Гэрэг (Gereg)	4:54
2.	"Wolf Totem"	Чонон сүлд (Chonon süld)	5:38
3.	"The Great Chinggis Khaan"	Их Чингис Хаан (Ikh Chingis khaan)	4:32
4.	"The Legend of Mother Swan"	Хун ээжийн домог (Khun eejiin domog)	5:25
5.	"Shoog Shoog"	Шөөг шөөг (Shöög shöög)	4:01
6.	"The Same"	Агаар нэгэн буй (Agaar negen bui)	5:27
7.	"Yuve Yuve Yu"	Юу вэ юу вэ юу? (Yuu ve yuu ve yuu?)	4:42
8.	"Shireg Shireg"	Ширэг ширэг	5:47
9.	"Song of Women"	Бүсгүйн дуу (Büsgüin duu)	7:16
Total length:			47:42

Deluxe Edition bonus tracks
No.	Title	Writer(s)	Mongolian title	Length
10.	"Wolf Totem (featuring Jacoby Shaddix of Papa Roach)"	The Hu; B.Dashdondog; Shaddix	Чонон сүлд	5:17
11.	"Yuve Yuve Yu (featuring From Ashes to New)"	The Hu; B.Dashdondog; Danny Case	Юу вэ юу вэ юу?	4:13
12.	"Song of Women (featuring Lzzy Hale of Halestorm)"	The Hu; B.Dashdondog; Hale	Бүсгйн дуун	5:49
13.	"Shireg Shireg (Acoustic)"		Ширэг ширэг	5:47
14.	"Yuve Yuve Yu (Acoustic)"		Юу вэ юу вэ юу?	4:43
15.	"Shoog Shoog (Acoustic)"		Шөөг шөөг	3:51
Total length:				77:22

== Personnel ==
The Hu

- Ts. Galbadrakh aka "Gala" – ayanga morin khuur, throat singing
- G. Nyamjantsan aka "Jaya" – tumur khuur, Tsuur, throat singing
- B. Enkhsaikhan aka "Enkush" – gal morin khuur, throat singing
- N. Temuulen aka "Temka" – baigali tovshuur, programming, mixing

Production

- B. Dashdondog aka "Dashka" – programming, mixing, engineering
- Ts. Shinebayar – engineering
- Ts. Oyunbayar – engineering
- Howie Weinberg – mastering

== Charts ==
Chart (2019)	Peak position
Australian Albums (ARIA)	11
Austrian Albums (Ö3 Austria)	25
Belgian Albums (Ultratop Flanders)	38
Belgian Albums (Ultratop Wallonia)	68
Canadian Albums (Billboard)	73
Finnish Albums (Suomen virallinen lista)	32
French Albums (SNEP)	99
German Albums (Offizielle Top 100)	24
Hungarian Albums (MAHASZ)	21
Scottish Albums (OCC)	7
Spanish Albums (PROMUSICAE)	95
Swiss Albums (Schweizer Hitparade)	14
UK Albums (OCC)	21
US Billboard 200	103
