= Altai Khairkhan =

Mongolian overtone singing ensemble

Altai Khairkan Алтай Хайрхан ᠠᠯᠲᠠᠢ ᠬᠠᠶᠢᠷᠬᠠᠨ
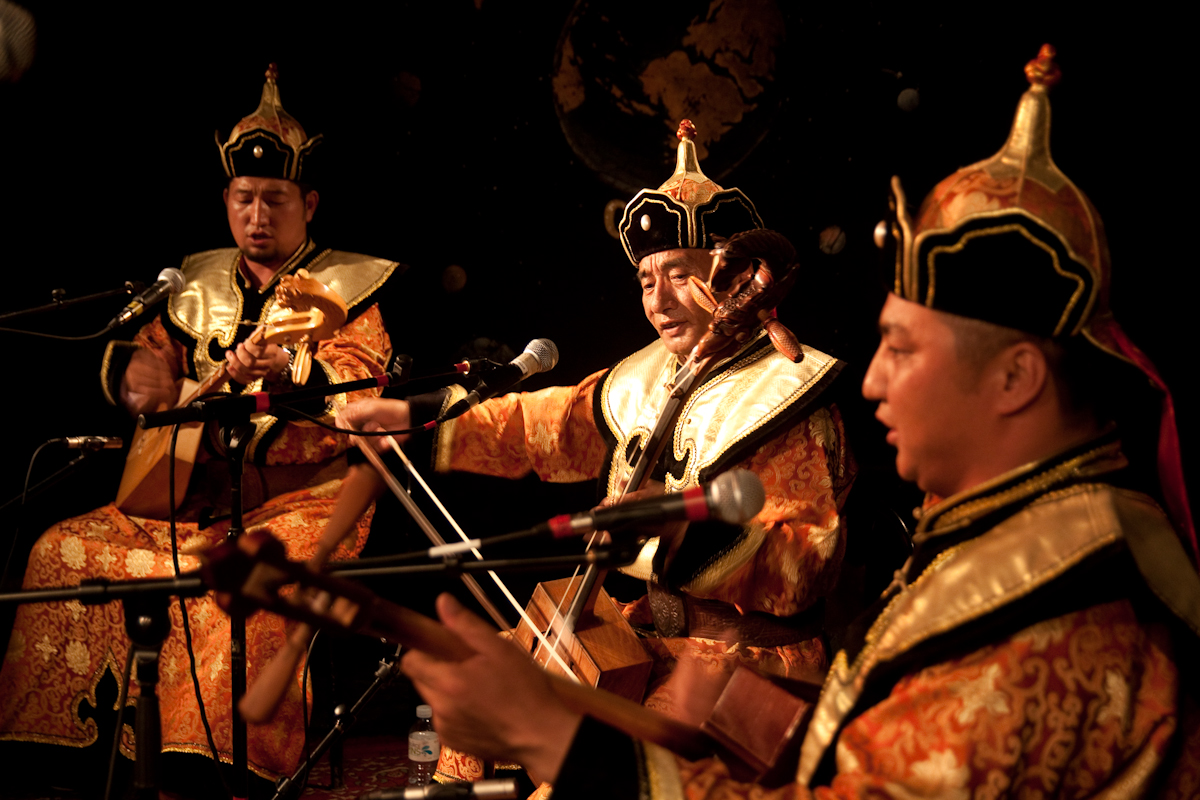
- Altai Khairkhan in Paris, June 2010. From left to right : P.Lkhamjav, S.Pürevjav, L.Lkhamragchaa.

Background information
- Origin: Uvs, Mongolia
- Genres: Overtone singing, Folk music
- Years active: Since 2002
- Labels: Independent
- Members: Palamjavyn Lkhamjav; Sambuugiin Pürevjav; Yansangiin Suglegmaa; Lkhagvasurengiin Lkhamragchaa
- Past members: Childeegiin Palamjav; Ejeegiin Toivgoo

Altai Khairkhan (Mongolian: Алтай Хайрхан) is an overtone singing ensemble from Mongolia founded in 2002 by Childeegiin Palamjav, Sambuugiin Pürevjav and Ejeegiin Toivgoo.

== Style and lyrical themes ==
"Altai Magtaal" (Altai Khairkhan, 2003)
Altai Khairkhan performing using various types of overtone singing

The members are from Uvs aimag, situated in the west of Mongolia near the Altai Mountains. Thus, the songs are often a praise to the mountains, rivers and animals of western Mongolia.

The band performs either songs of their own composition or Mongolian traditional songs using morin khuur, tovshuur and a range of overtone singing techniques called Khöömii (Mongolian: Хөөмий).

== Members ==
Current members

- Palamjavyn Lkhamjav (Паламжавын Лхамжав) – tovshuur, overtone singing
- Sambuugiin Pürevjav (Самбуугийн Пүрэвжав) – morin khuur, singing
- Yansangiin Süglegmaa (Янсангийн Сүглэгмаа) – yatga
- Lkhagvasürengiin Lkhamragchaa (Лхагвасүрэнгийн Лхамрагчаа) – tovshuur, overtone singing

Former members

- Childeegiin Palamjav (Чилдээгийн Паламжав) – tovshuur, overtone singing, dance
- Ejeegiin Toivgoo (Эжээгийн Тойвгоо) – tovshuur, overtone singing

== Discography ==
- 2003 : Whistle in the Wind (album)

No.	Title	Mongolian title	Length
1.	"An Oirat Call"	Oirodiin Uria	4:06
2.	"Praising The Altai"	Altai Magtaal	6:11
3.	"A Four Year Old Dun Colored Horse"	Durvun Nastai Khaliun	2:28
4.	"Full Moon"	Arvan Tavnii Sar	1:07
5.	"Praising The Khangai Mountain Ranges"	Khangai Magtaal	2:46
6.	"Two Folk Songs"	Ardyn Khoyor Duu	3:05
7.	"Gooj Nanaa"	Gooj Nanaa	2:44
8.	"Generous And Sacred Altai"	Buyant Altai Khairkhan	5:04
9.	"Mongolian Horse"	Mongol Mori	2:15
10.	"The Yellow Camel with a Quick And Pliable Pace"	Uulgun Shariin Yavdal	4:09
11.	"Praising Chingis Khaan"	Chingis Khaanii Magtaal	3:58
12.	"Praising Buural Tokhoi"	Buural Tokhoin Magtaal	1:56
13.	"Ambler"	Joroo Mori	1:56
14.	"River Buyant"	Buyant Gol	1:57
15.	"Four Mountains"	Durvun Uul	1:48
16.	"Praising Bogd Dunjingarav Mountain"	Bogd Dunjingarav Magtaal	4:11
17.	"Oirat Joined"	Oiratiin Tsomirlog	4:04
Total length:			54:08

- 2009 : Altai Khairkhan (video)

No.	Title	Mongolian title	Length
1.	"An Oirat Call"	Oirodiin Uria	4:06
2.	"Praising The Altai"	Altai Magtaal	5:30
3.	"River Tes"	Tes Goliin Magtaal	3:32
4.	"Praising The Khangai Mountain Range"	Khangai Magtaal	4:46
5.	"Praising Chingis Khaan"	Chingis Khaanii Magtaal	3:43
6.	"Generous And Sacred Altai"	Buyant Altai Khairkhan	5:00
7.	"Mongolian Horse"	Mongol Mori	2:09
8.	"The Yellow Camel with a Quick Pliable Pace"	Uulgun Shariin Yavdal	3:00
9.	"Praising Horse"	Aduun Surgiin Magtaal	2:41
10.	"Praising Bogd Dunjingarav"	Bogd Dunjingarav Magtaal	4:17
Total length:			40:04
