= Iklık =

Bowed string instrument

The ıklık or ıklığ is traditional Turkish bowed string instrument mostly used by the semi-nomadic Yörüks in the Taurus Mountains of Southern Turkey. It is analogous to the similar Tuvan and Mongolian horse-head fiddles. It also resembles a Rebab.

== Name ==
The word ıklık or ıklığ is a dialectal alteration of a Middle Turkic term, oklug, meaning arrowed, and referring to the bow of the instrument. However, folk etymology often ascribes the name to come from iki kıl "two string" as with the related Tuvan igil, which may come from the same source.

== History ==
The first documentation of the ıklığ in Anatolia is from the Seljuk Period. The name of the instrument is mentioned in many 13th and 14th century written sources.
