= Shanz =

String instrument
- Other names: Shudarga
- Classification: Chordophone: Plucked string instrument
- Hornbostel–Sachs classification: 321.312 (Spike box lutes)

Related instruments
- Sanxian; Shamisen; Sanshin; Đàn tam; Chanzy

More articles or information
- Music of Mongolia, List of Mongolian musical instruments

Shanz on display at the National Museum of Mongolia

The shanz or shudarga (Mongolian: шанз, шударга,ᠱᠠᠨᠵᠠ Mongolian pronunciation: [ʃants]) is a three-stringed traditional Mongolian plucked string instrument. It is closely related to the sanxian.

== Name ==
The name shudarga (Mongolian:ᠱᠤᠳᠤᠷᠭᠤ shudurgu) seems to derive from the verb шудрах (Mongolian:ᠱᠤᠳᠤᠷᠬᠣ shudurhu-, to brush against) which describes the way the instrument is played. Whereas shanz is borrowed from 弦子 (xiánzi), referring to 三弦 (sānxián).

== Description ==
Like the sanxian, the shanz has a long fretless fingerboard. The resonator is oval-shaped and the shell is made from wood (elm or sandalwood). Snakeskins are stretched and attached to cover the resonator. The main difference with the sanxian is the playing technique: the shanz is played with a small, round bamboo stick, which is nowadays often replaced by the plastic tube of a ballpoint pen.

The top string of the instrument is generally tuned an octave above the lowest one and the middle instrument an interval of a fourth or a fifth above the lowest string. The most commonly used tuning is G-d-g.

The shanz is mainly used to accompany singing and commonly used in ensembles or orchestras of traditional Mongolian instruments, as well as in short folk songs (bogino duu) and Huree songs. Nowadays, the shanz is rather popular in Mongolian pop music.

== History ==
The early history of the shanz is vague, but its current form has been influenced by the sanxian. Historical variants of the spike lute known from writing include the shidurghū in Persian texts. The instruments had a connection to the steppe cultures. Images have been found from Mongolian peoples in Northern China, to the Turkic and Persian peoples in Northern India, Central Asia and Iran.

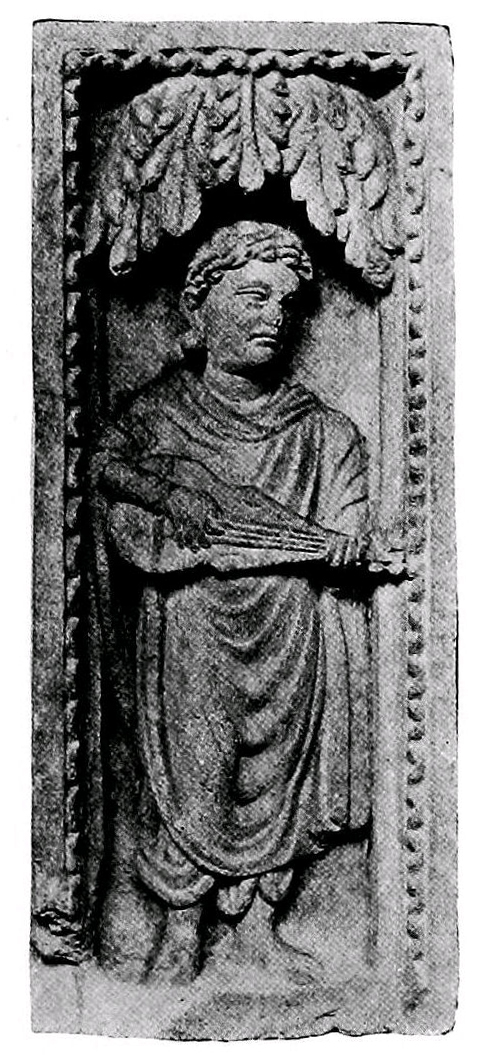
Kushan lute, 1st to 3rd century AD. Found in Yusufzai district near Peshawar, Pakistan.

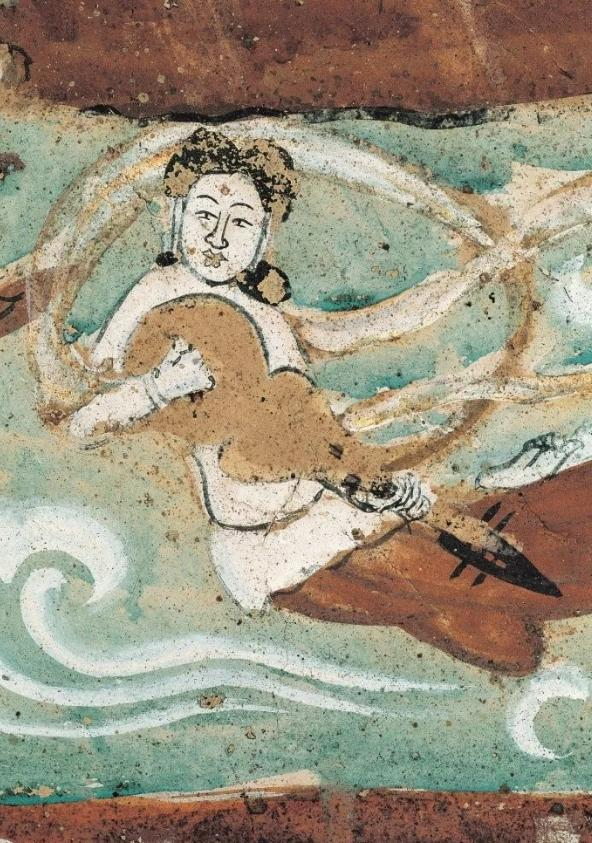
Chinese double-chambered lute, Mogao Cave 322, Early Tang dynasty (618–704 AD)

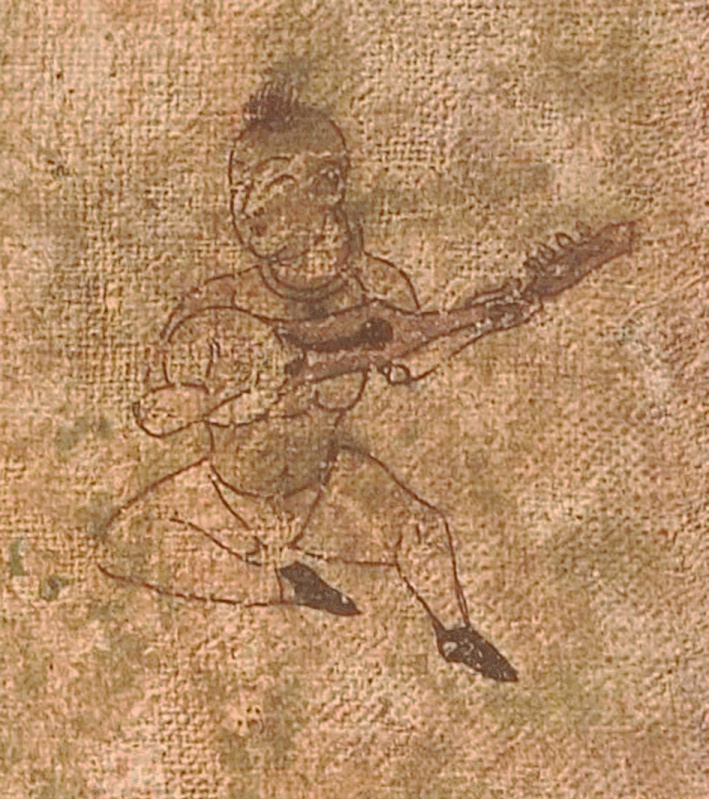
Shidurghū or huobosi or komuz, 9th century A.D, (Yar-khoto) Jiaohe ruins, China.

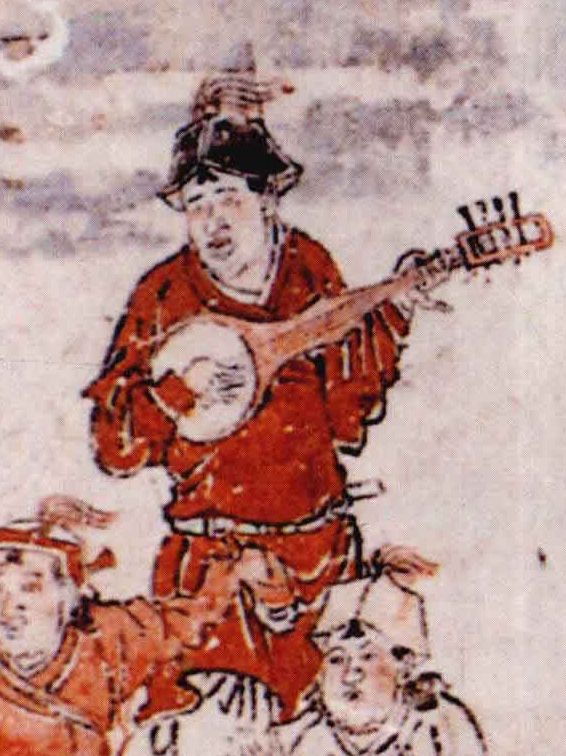
Mongolian lute, c. 1297, Tomb of Wang Qing, China. Probable shidurghū or sugudu

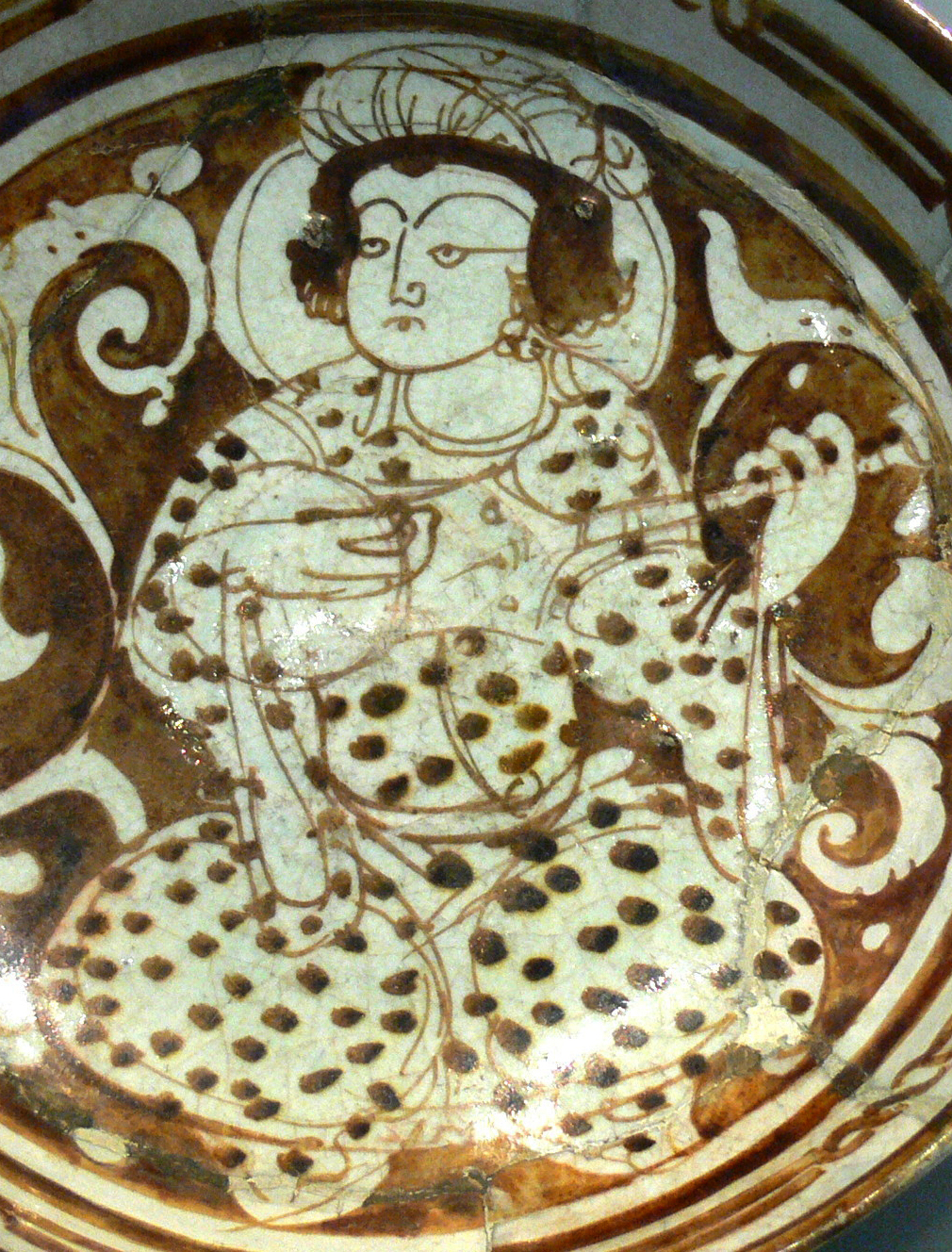
Iranian style rubab from the 13th century AD, found in Rayy (near Tehran, Iran).

== Notable Shanz players ==
- Shanz 3

== See also ==
- List of Mongolian musical instruments
- Sanxian
- Sanshin
- Shamisen
- Đàn tam
