= Long song =

Mongolian musical tradition

- Native name: Urtyn duu
- Cultural origins: Mongolian music
- Typical instruments: Morin khuur and limbe (east); None or Igil (west)

Urtiin Duu, traditional folk long song
- UNESCO Intangible Cultural Heritage
- Country: Mongolia
- Reference: 00115
- Region: Asia and the Pacific

Inscription history
- Inscription: 2008 (3rd session)
- List: Representative

Long song

The long song (Mongolian: ᠤᠷᠲᠠ ᠢᠢᠨ
ᠳᠠᠭᠤᠨ, Urtyn duu) is one of the central elements of the traditional music of Mongolia. This genre is called "Long song" not only because the songs are long, but also because each syllable of text is extended for a long duration. A four-minute song may only consist of ten words. Certain long songs such as Uvgin shuvuu khoyor, also known as Jargaltain delger (lit. 'Old man and the Bird') take up to three hours to sing at full length, with all thirty-two stanzas. Lyrical themes vary depending on context; they can be philosophical, religious, romantic, or celebratory, and often use horses as a symbol or theme repeated throughout the song. Eastern Mongols typically use a Morin khuur (horse-head fiddle) as accompaniment, sometimes with a type of indigenous flute, called limbe. Oirat groups of the Western Mongols traditionally sing long songs unaccompanied or accompanied with the Igil.

== Description ==
The Mongolian long song folk music tradition has ties to other national traditions and customs, including Mongolian history, culture, aesthetics, ethics and philosophy. The main feature of the long song is the shuranhai (prolonged, tenuto notes with deeply modulated vibrato on the vowels). The Mongol aizam long songs are ancient grand songs that possess extensively broad vocal diapason and diverse vocal movement techniques, elaborate singing elements and vocal improvisations such as dan (single) and davkhar (double) shurankhai (tenuto notes with deeply modulated vibrato on the vowels), nugalaa (sharp notes modulated in lower pitch), various vocal ‘soothing’ long-drawns, upward and downward usrelt (tone leaps or sudden transmission to higher or lower tones), tsokhilgo (vocal modulated pulsation), tsatslaga (sprinkling), khayalga (bestrewing or free improvised tone), shigshree (sifting or repeated vocal vibration) and other unique singing techniques. These features give the long song profound philosophical, meditational character, often depicting the spacious mountain valleys and a sense of tranquility, believed to represent the Mongolian soul.

Three major styles are identified in long songs: besreg urtyn duu ("minor long song"), suman urtyn duu ("ordinary long song") and aizam urtyn duu ("major' or majestic long songs"). Again, the styles reflect the way of the performance of the shuranhai and other techniques rather than the lengths of the songs. The word ‘Aizam’ comes from the non-lexical vocable of ‘Aya, zee khu’ at the beginning of the grand long song, which features a broad melody with a context of philosophical theme, ceremony and quality of ode, honor, respect or solemnity. The aizam grand long songs are sung in a sequence at the beginning of a ceremony or feast, in accordance with the special ceremonial rules, and constitute the summit of the long songs which test the skills and capability of the singer and morin khuur (horse-headed fiddle) player.

== Modern history ==
UNESCO declared the Mongolian Long Song one of the Masterpieces of the Oral and Intangible Heritage of Humanity in 2005.

On April 12, 2013, the 'Mongolian Statehood Long Song' was officially exalted at the Mongolian Statehood History Museum located in the State Ceremony Great Hall of the Government House of Mongolia. 'Mongolian Statehood Long Song' is an album of nine Mongolian aizam ("grande") long songs, including Ertnii saikhan ("Ancient Splendid"), Tumen Ekh ("Myriad's Leader"), Khuur Magnai ("Fiddle Leader"), Durtmal saikhan ("Iridescent Splendid"), Kherlengiin bariya ("Sight of Kherulen River"), Ikh Zambuutiviin naran (The Sun over the Placid World), Asaryn undur ("Heavenly Noble"), Erkhem tur (Statehood of Excellence) and Enkh mendiin bayar ("Celebration of Welfare"). These songs were sung by Dorjdagva Myagmarsuren, long song singer and now independent researcher. He served as a researcher at the International Institute for the Study of Nomadic Civilizations, a UNESCO branch institution, in 2007-2021. The morin khuur musician on the project is Battulga Batbold, one of the most proficient morin khuur musicians at present. This album is the first and only recording of full-length Mongolian grand long songs, which were almost lost during the socialist regime, when the long song was only allowed to be sung on stage for 3–5 minutes. It did become a significant event in the history of Mongolian musicology, folk music tradition, cultural heritage and continuation and preservation of Mongolian classic art of long song, according to Mongolian renowned scholars, researchers, academicians and musicologists. The songs on the album feature singing at full length (direct audio recording without any pause, music arrangement nor engineering), complete lyrics, authentic Mongolian singing techniques, different singing styles of Central Khalkha or Eastern Mongolia and Western Mongolia as well as ancient melody of each song restored on the basis of his research of a dozen years as well as accompaniment of authentic traditional Morin khuur with leather cover and horse-hair strings. The total length of the nine long songs is 258 minutes, each song with a length of 25–35 minutes. The single edition of Mongolian Statehood Long Song encased in a wooden case inlaid with nine jewels is donated to, registered and kept at the State Intangible Heritage Fund of National Cultural Heritage Center of Mongolia. In September 2014, the album of Mongolian Statehood Long Song by M.Dorjdagva was released publicly with the support of the Ministry of Culture, Sports and Tourism of Mongolia and the Arts and Culture Development Foundation of Mongolia.

Music researcher Ojuna W. Pilcher has published several studies of the long song in the region of Alxa League in Inner Mongolia. She has observed that the long song today expresses a nostalgia of the past after modernization, and “visual and zoological metaphors connected to the nomadic lifestyle are not only highly significant to urtyn duu’s song texts, categorization, and singing technique but are also closely related to ornamentation, the achievement of vocal timbre, the singers’ understanding of nomadic herding life, and their feelings of longing and nostalgia as expressed through the music.”
