= Horse-head fiddle =

Horse-head fiddle may refer to any of several types of bowed string instruments which often feature a carved horse's head at the peghead:

- Morin khuur, a Mongolian instrument
- Gusle, a Balkan instrument
- Igil, a Tuvan instrument
