= The Hu =

Mongolian folk metal band

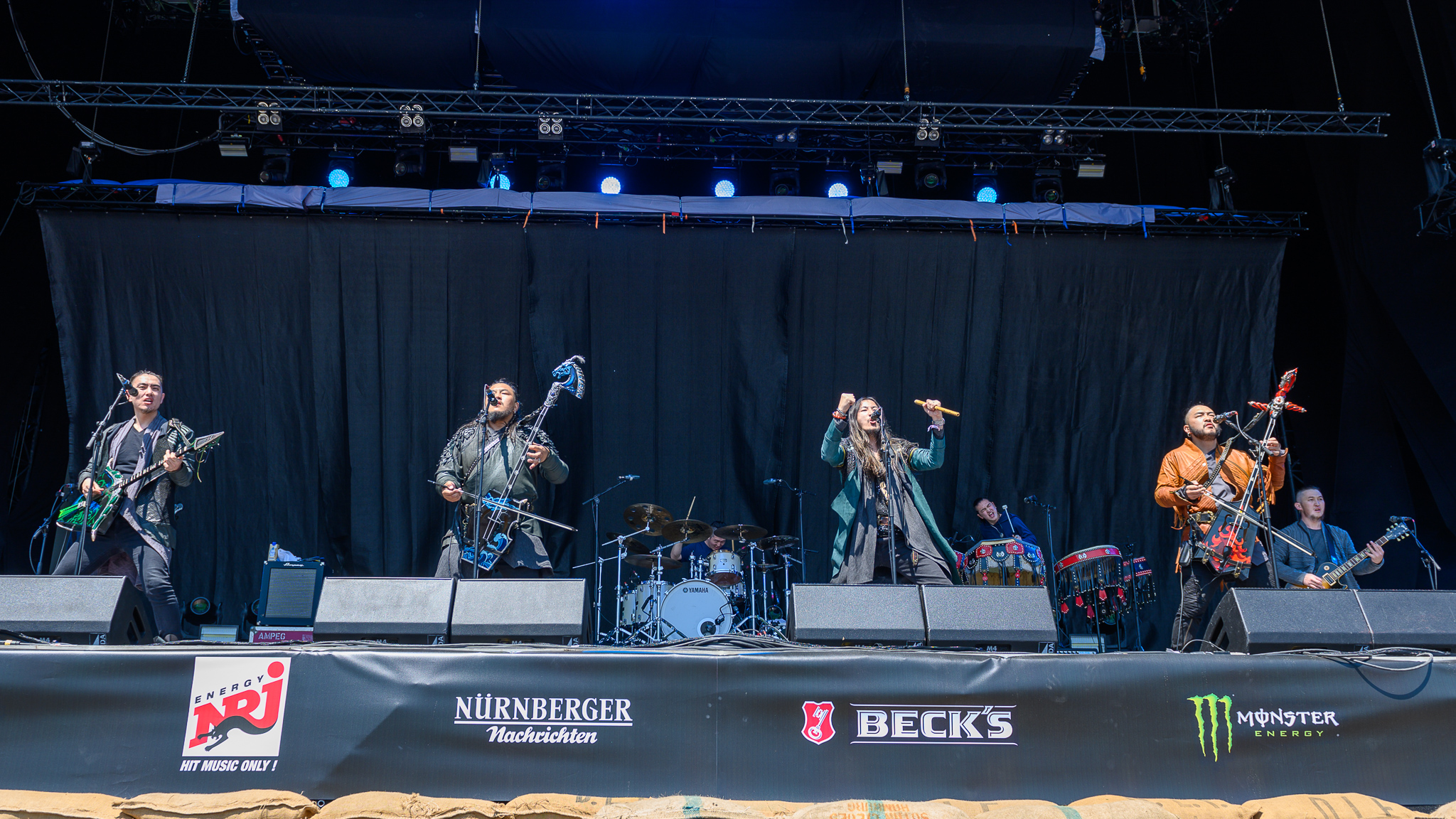
- The Hu performing in 2019. L–R: Temka, Gala, Jaya, Enkush

Background information
- Origin: Ulaanbaatar, Mongolia
- Genres: Folk metal
- Years active: 2016–present
- Labels: Dashka Productions; Eleven Seven/Better Noise
- Members: Gala; Jaya; Enkush; Temka
- Website: thehuofficial.com

The Hu (pronounced as "the who") is a Mongolian folk metal band formed in 2016 in Ulaanbaatar. Incorporating traditional Mongolian instrumentation, including the morin khuur, the tovshuur, and throat singing, the band calls their style of music "hunnu rock", a term inspired by the Xiongnu, an ancient nomadic empire based in Mongolia proper, known as Hünnü in Mongolian. Some of the band's lyrics include old Mongolian war cries and poetry in the Mongolian language.

The Hu consists of Galbadrakh "Gala" Tsendbaatar, Nyamjantsan "Jaya" Galsanjamts, Enkhsaikhan "Enkush" Batjargal, and Temuulen "Temka" Naranbaatar. They have released the studio albums The Gereg (2019), Rumble of Thunder (2022), and Hun (2026).

== History ==
=== Beginnings: 2016–2019 ===
The four members of the Hu (Enkhsaikhan "Enkush" Batjargal, Nyamjantsan "Jaya" Galsanjamts, Temuulen "Temka" Naranbaatar, Galbadrakh "Gala" Tsendbaatar) studied at the Mongolian State Music and Dance Conservatory, practicing throat singing and traditional Mongolian music. The singer Bayarmagnai "Dashka" Dashdondog formed the band in 2016 as their producer and songwriter, selecting students from the conservatory. With an interest in trying something new and a genre of heavy metal music previously banned from the country, they incorporated traditional instruments and drew inspiration from the Hunnu empire in a style they called "Hunnu rock". The band adopted the name the Hu (Mongolian for "human beings").

We took the name because of the inclusive nature. It's not about being Mongolian; it's about being human.

— "Temka" Naranbaatar, 2019, The Guardian

Gala's older brother, Tuga Namgur, would later be recruited as the band's interpreter and manager.

The Hu released two videos on YouTube in late 2018: "Yuve Yuve Yu" and "Wolf Totem". On 11 April 2019, "Wolf Totem" reached #1 on Billboard's Hard Rock Digital Song Sales, making the Hu the first Mongolian musical act to top a Billboard chart. In addition, "Yuve Yuve Yu" reached #7 on the same chart, while "Wolf Totem" debuted at #22 on Billboard's Hot Rock Songs chart.

On 17 May 2019, the Hu met Mongolian president Khaltmaagiin Battulga, who congratulated the band for their accomplishments in promoting the country. On 6 June 2019, the band released the lyric video for their third single, "Shoog Shoog". In June and July 2019, they performed 23 concerts in twelve European countries. The band released the music video for their fourth single, "The Great Chinggis Khaan", on 23 August 2019.

=== The Gereg (2019–2021) ===
The Hu released their first studio album, titled The Gereg, on 13 September 2019, via Eleven Seven Records. Gereg is a term used for a diplomatic passport from the time of Genghis Khan. In describing its sound, songwriter/producer Dashka claimed they sought to "find, study and incorporate as much of Mongolia's musical culture as they could into a rock style".

The band subsequently embarked on their first North American tour, from September to December 2019, to promote The Gereg. On 4 October, they issued a new version of "Yuve Yuve Yu", featuring vocals by Danny Case of From Ashes to New. On 13 December, the band released a remix of "Wolf Totem", featuring Jacoby Shaddix of Papa Roach. This version was featured in the horror film The Retaliators. On 1 May 2020, a remix of "Song of Women", featuring Lzzy Hale of Halestorm, was released online.

On 27 November 2019, the Hu received the highest state award in Mongolia, the Order of Genghis Khan, for promoting Mongolian culture around the world.

While touring in Australia in April 2020, the band was forced into lockdown at an Airbnb near Sydney for 45 days due to the COVID-19 pandemic. While there, they worked on the single "Black Thunder" and filmed a series of cooking videos titled "Hu's in the Kitchen", uploading them to their YouTube channel. On 28 June 2020, the band uploaded their COVID-19 relief fundraising concert on YouTube. In an interview before the event, they stated their plan to release their second album in 2021. In July, a Simlish version of their song "The Legend of Mother Swan", performed by Myrkur, was featured in the video game The Sims 4, as part of the "Nifty Knitting" stuff pack. On 3 December 2020, the band released a cover version of Metallica's "Sad but True".

In 2020, the Hu were selected as one of 53 artists to participate in the tribute album The Metallica Blacklist, released on 1 October 2021 to commemorate the 30th anniversary of Metallica's 1991 self-titled album. They contributed a cover of "Through the Never". All profits from the album's sales were donated to charity, with each contributing band choosing a particular cause. The Hu selected the Giving Day Charity Fund.

In September and October 2021, the band returned to North America for the Hun Tour, their first live performance since the onset of the COVID-19 pandemic. They played a selection of songs from The Gereg and their forthcoming studio album, Rumble of Thunder.

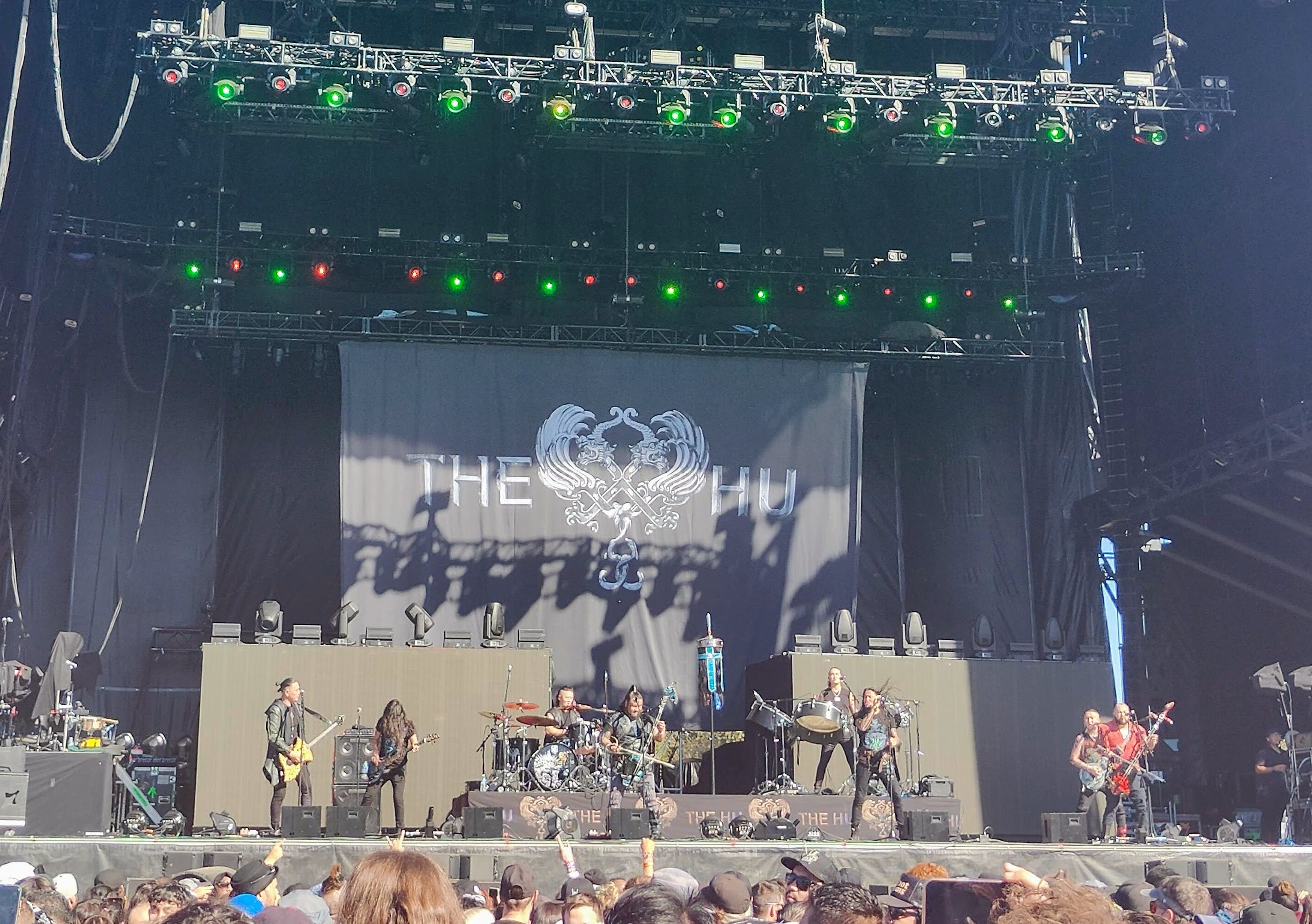
The Hu performing at Aftershock 2023

=== Rumble of Thunder (2022–2025) ===
On 12 May 2022, the Hu released the single "This Is Mongol". "Black Thunder" followed on 8 July, and the band announced their second album, Rumble of Thunder, which came out on 2 September. Songwriter Dashka described modern society and ancestral history as inspirations for the album, with a goal of expanding the sound outlined in The Gereg. The band would return to Australia, where they spent lockdown in 2020, in August 2022.

On 10 February 2023, they released their music video for "This Is Mongol (Warrior Souls)", featuring William DuVall of Alice in Chains on lead vocals and rhythm guitar. On 30 March, they issued a remix of "Black Thunder", featuring Daniel "DL" Laskiewicz of Bad Wolves and Serj Tankian of System of a Down.

On 25 March 2024, the British heavy metal band Iron Maiden announced that the Hu would support them on the North American leg of their Future Past tour. On 4 October, the band released a cover of Iron Maiden's 1983 single "The Trooper".

=== Hun (2026) ===
In July 2026, the Hu released their third studio album, Hun, which was preceded by the singles "The Real You" and "The Men".

== Star Wars Jedi ==
The Hu's music is used in two video games from the Star Wars universe: Star Wars Jedi: Fallen Order (2019) and Star Wars Jedi: Survivor (2023). Several of their songs can be heard during gameplay, performed by the in-game band the Agasar. These include "Hohochu", "Sugaan Essena" ("Black Thunder"), and "Eseerin Vasahina".

We were all fans of Star Wars beforehand. We started watching the movies at such young ages and all wanted to be Luke Skywalker. The character of Luke gives us a desire to be strong, honest men.

— "Gala" Tsendbaatar, 2020, Revolver

The lyrics for "Sugaan Essena" were originally drafted in Mongolian and performed during live shows in Europe and North America. Following tour dates, the lyrics were rewritten in an alien language for use in the game. Gala claimed the band "would love to perform it (the song) in the Star Wars language we created, but it would be too hard".

== Band members ==
Current

- Galbadrakh "Gala" Tsendbaatar – morin khuur, throat singing (2016–present)
- Nyamjantsan "Jaya" Galsanjamts – tumur khuur, tsuur, throat singing (2016–present)
- Enkhsaikhan "Enkush" Batjargal – morin khuur, throat singing (2016–present)
- Temuulen "Temka" Naranbaatar – tovshuur, backing vocals (2016–present)

Touring members

- Unumunkh "Ono" Maralkhuu – percussion, tumur khuur, backing vocals (2019–present)
- Jambaldorj "Jamba" Ayush – guitars, backing vocals (2019–present)
- Odbayar "Odko" Gantumur – drums (2019–present)
- Nyamdavaa "Davaa" Byambaa – bass, backing vocals (2020–present)

Former touring members

- Batkhuu Batbayar – bass, backing vocals (2019–2020)

== Discography ==
=== Studio albums ===
Title	Details	Peak chart positions									
Title	Details	AUS	AUT	BEL (FL)	CAN	FIN	FRA	GER	SWI	UK	US
The Gereg	Released: 13 September 2019; Label: Eleven Seven; Formats: CD, digital download, streaming	11	25	38	73	32	99	24	14	21	103
Rumble of Thunder	Released: 2 September 2022; Label: Better Noise; Formats: CD, LP, digital download, streaming	—	38	—	—	—	—	38	18	—	—
Hun	Released: 24 July 2026; Label: Better Noise; Formats: CD, LP, digital download, streaming	53	—	—	—	—	— (Note: Hun did not enter the French Top Albums chart but peaked at number 49 on the French Physical Albums chart.)	—	43	—	—

=== EPs ===
Title	Details
The Trooper	Released: 4 October 2024; Label: Better Noise; Formats: Streaming
Echos of Thunder	Released: 13 June 2025; Label: Better Noise; Formats: Streaming

=== Live albums ===
Title	Details
Live at Glastonbury	Released: 7 June 2024; Label: Better Noise; Formats: CD, LP, digital download, streaming

=== Singles ===
List of singles, with selected chart positions
Title	Year	Peak chart positions					Certifications	Album
Title	Year	CAN Rock	US Main.	US Rock	US Rock Dig.	US World	Certifications	Album
"Yuve Yuve Yu" (solo or with From Ashes to New)	2018	49	4	35	7	2	MC: Gold	The Gereg
"Wolf Totem" (solo or with Jacoby Shaddix)	2018	34	5	22	1	1	MC: Platinum; RIAA: Gold	The Gereg
"Shoog Shoog"	2019	—	—	—	—	24		The Gereg
"The Great Chinggis Khaan"	2019	—	—	—	—	—		The Gereg
"Song of Women" (solo or with Lzzy Hale)	2020	—	—	—	—	4		The Gereg
"Sad but True"	2020	—	—	—	—	3		Non-album single
"Through the Never"	2021	—	—	—	—	—		The Metallica Blacklist
"This Is Mongol" (solo or with William DuVall)	2022	—	7	—	—	9		Rumble of Thunder
"Black Thunder" (solo or with Serj Tankian and Daniel "DL" Laskiewicz)	2022	—	11	—	—	14		Rumble of Thunder
"Bii Biyelgee" (acoustic)	2023	—	—	—	—	—		Rumble of Thunder
"Tatar Warrior" (live)	2024	—	—	—	—	—		Live at Glastonbury
"The Trooper"	2024	—	—	—	—	—		The Trooper
"Lost Soul" (featuring Jonny Hawkins)	2026	—	13	—	—	9		Hun
"—" denotes a recording that did not chart or was not released in that territory.

=== Music videos ===
Year	Title	Album
2018	"Yuve Yuve Yu"	The Gereg
2018	"Wolf Totem"	The Gereg
2018	"The Great Chinggis Khaan"	The Gereg
2019	"Yuve Yuve Yu" (featuring From Ashes to New)	The Gereg (Deluxe Edition)
2019	"Wolf Totem" (featuring Jacoby Shaddix)	The Gereg (Deluxe Edition)
2020	"Sad but True"	—
2022	"This Is Mongol"	Rumble of Thunder
2022	"Black Thunder Part 1"	Rumble of Thunder
2022	"Black Thunder Part 2"	Rumble of Thunder
2022	"Bii Biyelgee"	Rumble of Thunder
2023	"This Is Mongol (Warrior Souls)" (featuring William DuVall)	Rumble of Thunder (Deluxe Edition)
2023	"Black Thunder" (featuring Serj Tankian and Daniel "DL" Laskiewicz]	Rumble of Thunder (Deluxe Edition)
2023	"Sell the World"	Rumble of Thunder
2024	"Upright Destined Mongol"	Rumble of Thunder
2024	"The Trooper"	The Trooper (EP)

=== Video games ===
Year	Title	Role	Notes
2019	Star Wars Jedi: Fallen Order	The Agasar	In-universe band
2023	Star Wars Jedi: Survivor	The Agasar	In-universe band

== See also ==
- List of overtone musicians
