= Myagmarsürengiin Dorjdagva =

Mongolian singer

- Origin: Mongolia
- Genres: Folk,
- Occupation(s): Singer and long-song researcher
- Years active: 2000–present

Myagmarsürengiin Dorjdagva (Mongolian: Мягмарсүрэнгийн Дорждагва); 1986) is a long-song singer from Mongolia and an independent long-song researcher. In 2007-2021, he served as a researcher at the International Institute for the Study of Nomadic Civilizations (IISNC), an international institution established upon the initiative and support of UNESCO in 1998.

== Biography ==
Dorjdagva was born in Uliastai soum of Zavkhan Province. From his childhood, he used to sing for private entertainment on pastures while herding horses. At the age of 19, he came to Ulaanbaatar to study at the Mongolian University of Arts and Culture, but first became the disciple of the renowned long song singer U.Bazarbat, who taught him traditional singing techniques and authentic breathing methods of Mongolian long song singing. He was enrolled at and graduated from the Mongolian University of Arts and Culture as a professional long song singer in 2006. He worked as a solo long song singer at the Folk Ensemble of Mongolian Railway in 2006–2007. In his studenthood, he released his first album titled 'Nomadic Melodies – 1' audio CD in 2007. He won the third place in the First State Contest of Professional Long Song Singer named after S.Damchaa, Mongolian renowned long song singer in 2007. In 2007, he became a researcher at the International Institute For the Study of Nomadic Civilizations, where he worked until September, 2021. Within the framework of his research on Mongolian long song, he implemented the international research project on 'Traditional Heritage and Singing Proficiency of Long Song' in 2008–2010 and conducted the field expeditions of the project and executed the progressive and final report. This project involved over 40 researchers from Mongolia, Russia and PR of China, implemented research expeditions in 8 different regions and rural areas over a distance of 40 000 km of travel among the Mongol ethnic groups living in the territories of Mongolia, Russia and China; interviewed about 300 long song singers aged between 12 and 90, documented video recordings of over 170 hours and recorded over 500 long songs and version melodies. As an outcome of the 5-years study, Dorjdagva compiled and published the book titled 'Mongolian Long Song and Its Inheritors' with an audio CD by the support of the Ministry of Culture, Sports and Tourism and the IISNC. He has conducted comparative research on local traditions, peculiar characteristics and singing techniques of local styles of Bayanbaraat, Borjigin of Central Khalkha or Eastern Mongolia, Western Khalkha (all of which he uses in his singing), as well as those in Inner Mongolia and Buryatia and Tuva, Russia. In 2011, he won the award of 'Best Singer, who Restored and Sang Proficiently the Ancient Long-forgotten Long song' in the professional singers' category of the First State Contest of National Long Song of 'Myriad's Leader of Horse-riding Nations'. He focuses on collecting, studying and restoring the forgotten long songs on the basis of his in-depth research, besides performing on stage, has published numerous research articles on Mongolian long song on quarterly bulletins of the IISNC and has made speech on many international and national forums on Mongolian intangible heritage, specifically on Mongolian classic long song, held by the IISNC.

He started searching, studying and learning Mongolian ancient long songs when he studied as a professional singer since 2001. Together with his friend, B.Battulga, proficient morin khuur musician, Dorjdagva started his experimentation on restoring the long song, intangible cultural heritage of Mongolia, in full length on the basis of original and complete lyrics and variants of long song melodies throughout the country. They tried modern woodenbox f-hole Morin khuur, [limbe], Mongolian traditional flute and finally came up on traditional Mongolian leatherbox [Morin khuur] with horse hair strings that perfectly matched with long song singing. After a dozen years of research and attempt, the two artists had their album Mongolian Statehood Long Song officially exalted on 12 April 2013 at the Mongolian Statehood History Museum located in the State Ceremony Great Hall of the Government House of Mongolia. Mongolian Statehood Long Song is an album of 9 Mongolian aizam ("grande") long songs, including Ertnii saikhan ("Ancient Splendid"), Tumen Ekh ("Myriad's Leader"), Khuur Magnai ("Fiddle Leader"), Durtmal saikhan ("Iridescent Splendid"), Kherlengiin baraa ("Sight of Kherulen River"), Ikh Zambuutiviin naran ("Sun of Great Jambudvipa"), Asaryn undur ("Heavenly Noble"), Erkhem tur ("Statehood of Excellence") and Enkh mendiin bayar ("Celebration of Welfare"). These songs were sung by Myagmarsürengiin Dorjdagva. Morin khuur musician Battulga Batbold, one of the most proficient Morin khuur musicians at present, is the professional teacher of Morin khuur class at the Music and Dance College of Mongolia.

The creation of this album is the first and only edition of full-length Mongolian grand long songs, which were almost lost during the socialist regime as the long song was allowed to sing on stage only for 3–5 minutes. It did become a significant event in the history of Mongolian musicology, folk music tradition, cultural heritage and continuation and preservation of Mongolian classic art of long song, according to Mongolian renowned scholars, researchers, academicians and musicologists. The songs in the album feature singing in full-length (direct audio recording without any pause, music arrangement nor engineering), complete lyrics, authentic Mongolian singing techniques, different singing styles of Central Khalkha or Eastern Mongolia and Western Mongolia as well as ancient melody of each song restored on the basis of his research of a dozen years as well as accompaniment of authentic traditional Morin khuur with leather-cover and horse-hair strings.

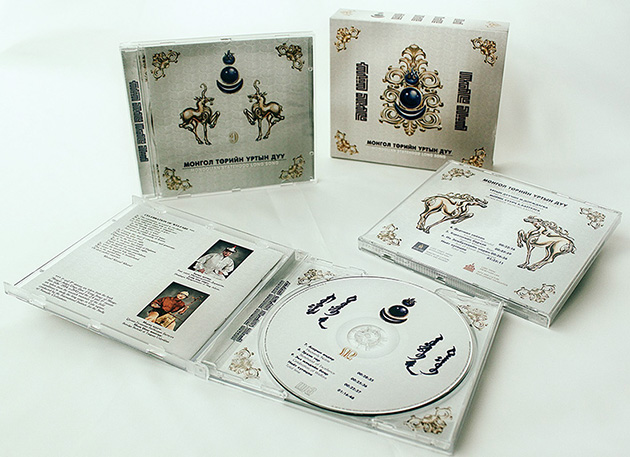
Mongolian Statehood Long Song' Triple-CD album for public release

The total length of the 9 long songs are 258 minutes in total, each song with a length of 25–35 minutes. The single edition of Mongolian Statehood Long Song encased in a wooden case inlaid with Nine Jewels is created by Dorjdagva, donated to and kept at the State Intangible Heritage Fund of National Cultural Heritage Center of Mongolia. In September 2014, the album Mongolian Statehood Long Song was released with the support of the Ministry of Culture, Sports and Tourism of Mongolia and the Arts and Culture Development Foundation of Mongolia.

== Discography ==
- 'Nomadic Melodies – 1' audio CD, 2005
- 'Mongolian Statehood Long Song', an album of 9 full-length Mongolian grand long songs, 2013
