= Doshpuluur =

Musical instrument

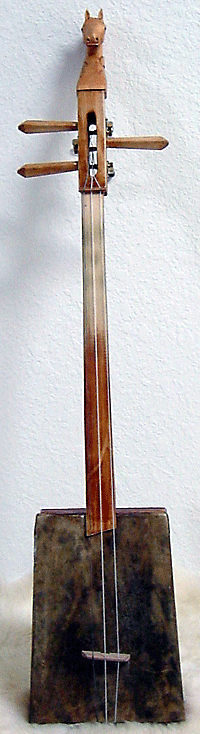
- A doshpuluur

String instrument
- Classification: Plucked string instrument
- Hornbostel–Sachs classification: 321.322

Related instruments
- Topshur, Chanzy

Builders
- Aldar Tamdyn

The doshpuluur (Tuvan: дошпулуур, [dɔʃpuˈluːr], Russian pronunciation: [dəʃpʊˈluːr]) is a long-necked Tuvan lute made from wood, usually pine or larch. The doshpuluur is played by plucking and strumming.

There are two different versions of the doshpuluur. One version has a trapezoidal soundbox, which is covered on both sides by goat skin and is fretless. The other has a kidney-shaped soundbox mostly of wood with a small goat or snake skin roundel on the front and has frets.

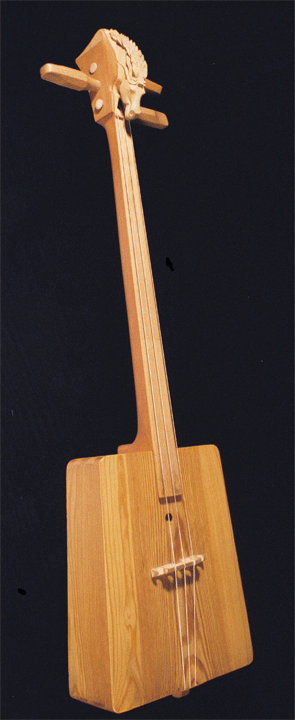
Doshpuluur made by Marat Damdyn

Traditionally the instrument has only two strings, but there are also versions with three or even four strings. The two strings are commonly tuned a perfect fifth apart, with the third string usually forming the octave. Sometimes the two strings are tuned a perfect fourth apart. Like the other stringed instruments of Tuva, it is traditionally used as an accompaniment for a solo performance.

== See also ==
- Igil
- Music of Tuva
- Topshur
