= Altai Kai =

Altai folk group

- Also known as: Altai Kay
- Origin: Altai Republic, Russian Federation
- Genres: Folk
- Years active: 1997–present
- Members: Urmat Yntaev; Alexei Alash Topchin; Edouard Ezendei Sogonokov; Aidyn Orsulov; Artysh Pikin
- Past members: Oyrot (Leonid) Otukov; Emil Terkishev; Radmila Terkisheva; Amyr Akchin; Solunai Sapysheva; Stepan Sarymai Urchimaev; Dmitry Arslan Khutornenko
- Website: www.altaikai.ru

Altai Kai (stylized, АлтайКАЙ) is an Altai folk band from the Altai Republic of the Russian Federation, founded by Urmat Yntaev in 1997. Their band name means Altaian Folklore. Their music features throat singing, and several native musical instruments, including the khomus and topshuur. Their music is often about the nature and history of Altai.

== Performances ==
- The John F. Kennedy Center for the Performing Arts (live internet broadcast) in Washington, D.C. in 2006.
- 68th Annual National Folk Festival in Richmond, Virginia in 2006.
- Czech Philharmonic Orchestra, Dvořák hall (Altai Kai, Hradistan & Czech Philharmonic Orchestra) in Prague in 2007.
- Lope de Vega theatre (WOMEX and BBC-supported concert) in Sevilla in 2007.
- Royal Opera House (BBC live Altai Kai performance recording) in London in 2008.
- WOMAD Festival (BBC live broadcast) in Charlton Park in 2008.

== Albums ==
- Where Altai Is In Rise - Musical Traditions Of Altai People (2002)
- XXI Век (XXI Century) (2005)
- Khan Altai (2005)
- Made In USA (2006)
- XXI Century (Version II) (2006)
- Remix (2006)
- Altyn-Taiga (Golden Taiga) (2011)
- Altai Kabai (2013)
- Altai Tele (2017)

== See also ==
- Overtone singing
