= Ever büree =

Mongolian musical instrument

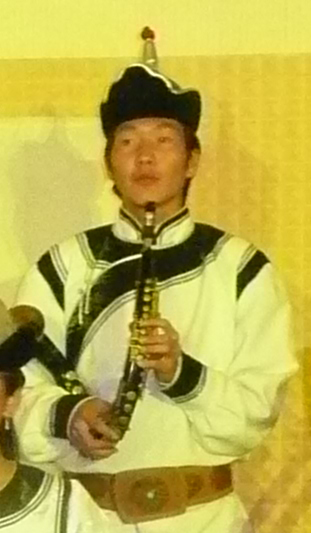
Ever büree player in a Mongolian ensemble

The ever büree (Mongolian: эвэр бүрээ) is a Mongolian musical instrument, part of the clarinet family. Despite the fact that its name translates to "horn-trumpet", it has the timbre of the low range of a clarinet, or more precisely of a basset horn (an F alto clarinet with a range down to low C).

In terms of construction, it is an almost cylindrical tube made of black ebony, curved in a circular manner to allow the bell of the instrument to slip underneath the player's right arm. A mouthpiece (usually a saxophone mouthpiece) with a single reed is attached at the upper end of the tube. The keywork is made of guuli, a metal similar to brass, and shares similarities with the German Oehler system, since it has rolls to slide from one key to the next. Like all clarinets, it has a speaker key, which facilitates the production of the upper harmonics, elevating the tone by a 12th.

The ever büree was invented in the 1970s by Professor L. Sambalkhundev and frequently appears as part of the standard Mongolian orchestra, which typically has nine members.

The instrument was depicted on a Mongolian postage stamp in 1986.
