= Đàn tam =

Vietnamese musical instrument

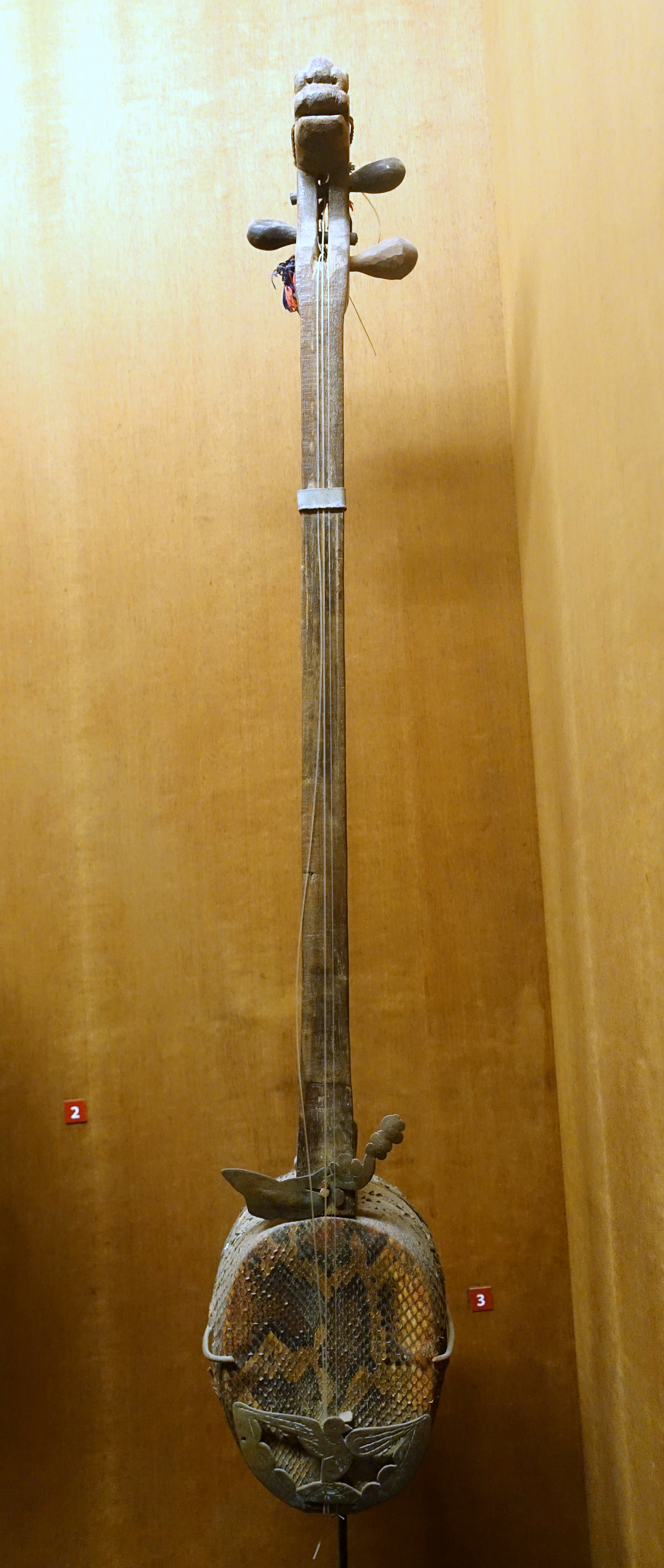
A đàn tam shown here in the Vietnam Museum of Ethnology in Hanoi.

The đàn tam (chữ Nôm: 彈三) is a three-stringed ("tam" means "three") fretless plucked Vietnamese musical instrument. It has a long fingerboard, and the body is traditionally partially covered by a snake skin stretched over a rounded rectangular resonator. It is similar to the Chinese sanxian. It is used in tuồng theatre as well as nhã nhạc.
