= Igil =

Musical instrument

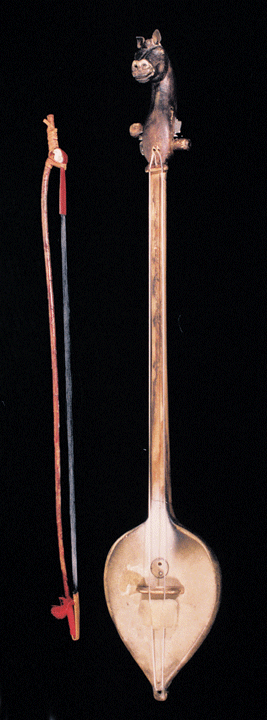
- Classification: Bowed string instrument

Related instruments
- Morin khuur (Mongolia)

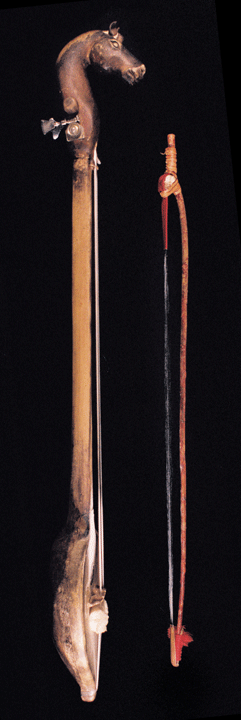
Igil made by Oktober Saya

The igil (Tuvan: игил), also known as ikhel in Mongolian (Mongolian: ихэл) is a two-stringed Mongolian and Tuvan musical instrument, played by bowing the strings. (It is called "ikili" in Western Mongolia.) The neck and lute-shaped sound box are usually made of a solid piece of pine or larch. The top of the sound box may be covered with skin or a thin wooden plate. The strings, and those of the bow, are traditionally made of hair from a horse's tail (strung parallel), but may also be made of nylon. Like the morin khuur of Mongolia, the igil typically features a carved horse's head at the top of the neck above the tuning pegs, and both instruments are known as the horsehead fiddle.

The igil is held nearly upright when played, with the sound box of the instrument in the performer's lap, or braced against the top of the performer's boot. Playing technique involves touching the strings with the nails or fingertips, but without pressing them to the neck. The igil has no frets. The bow is held with an underhand grip.

In Mongolia, Buryatia, and Kalmykia, every nomadic family traditionally kept an Ikhel in its yurt, and it was used to accompany performances of the Epic of Jangar in the evenings.

The igil formerly had an entire genre dedicated to it, with a repertoire of songs meant to be performed only on the igil. During the communist period in Tuva attempts were made to "modernize" the igil. This was nothing more than an attempt to westernize the instrument making it more like the European cello. However the instruments and playing style used by most Tuvan musicians today are largely the same as the original form of the igil.

Famous players of the igil include Ak-ool Kara-sal, Andrei Chuldum-ool, Kaigal-ool Khovalyg, Igor Koshkendei, Mongun-ool Ondar, Aldar Tamdyn, Radik Tulush and Evgenii Saryglar.

Very similar and related ("iki" means "two" in Turkic languages) Turkish instrument from western Taurus Mountains is "ıklığ", played by Yoruks it is slowly being revitalized from obscurity.

In Mongolian, "ikh" means great and "khel" means language. Together "ikh-khel" → "ikhel" means great language.

== See also ==
- Music of Tuva
- Tuvan throat singing
- Topshur
- Morin khuur
- Doshpuluur
- Iklık
- Yaylı tambur
