= Sanxian =

Chinese three-stringed lute

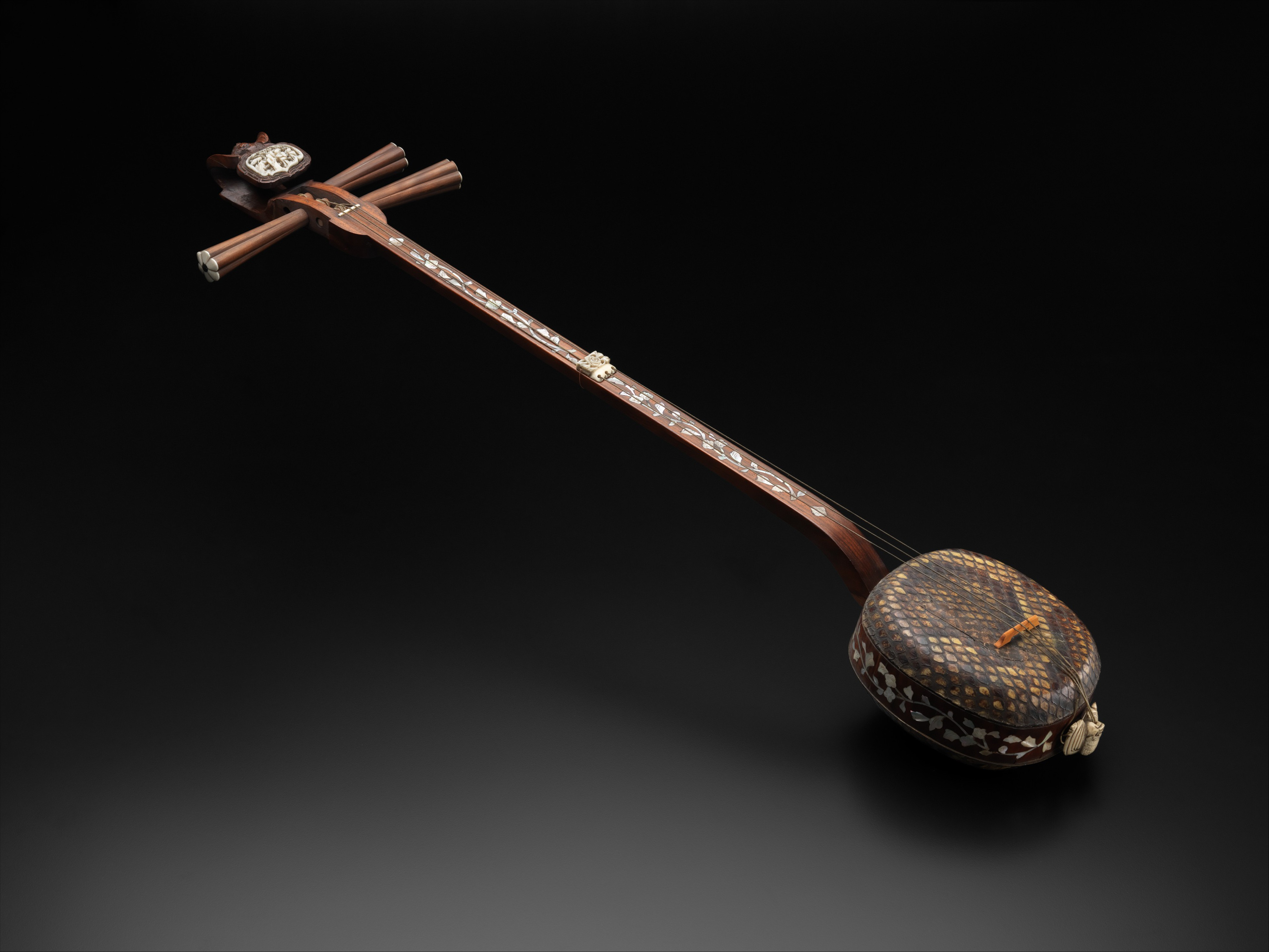
- Sanxian, c. 1900, at the Metropolitan Museum of Art
- Traditional Chinese: 三弦
- Simplified Chinese: 三弦
Transcriptions
Standard Mandarin
- Hanyu Pinyin: sānxián(r)
- Wade–Giles: san^{1}-hsien^{2}
- Yale Romanization: sān-syán
Yue: Cantonese
- Yale Romanization: sāamyìhn
- Jyutping: saam1 jin4

The sanxian (Chinese: 三弦, literally "three strings") is a three-stringed traditional Chinese lute. It has a long fretless fingerboard, and the body is traditionally made from snake skin stretched over a rounded rectangular resonator. It is made in several sizes for different purposes and in the early 20th century a four-stringed version, the jiaxian sanxian (加弦三弦), was developed. The northern sanxian is generally larger, at about 122 cm (48 in) in length, while southern versions of the instrument are usually about 95 cm (37 in) in length.

== History ==
It has been suggested that sanxian, a form of spike lute, may have its origin in the Middle East, and older forms of spike lute were also found in ancient Egypt. Similar instruments may have been present in China as early as the Qin dynasty as qin pipa (pipa was used as a generic term in ancient China for many other forms of plucked chordophones) or xiantao (弦鼗), which the Qinqin and Ruan also come from. Some thought that the instrument may have been re-introduced into China together with other instruments such as huqin by the Mongols during the Yuan dynasty (1271–1368), however, an image of a sanxian-like instrument was found in a stone sculpture dating from the Southern Song period (1217–79). The first record of the name "sanxian" may be found in a Ming dynasty text.

The instrument was transmitted to other East Asian countries, for example to the Ryukyus as sanshin and mainland Japan as shamisen.

== Description ==
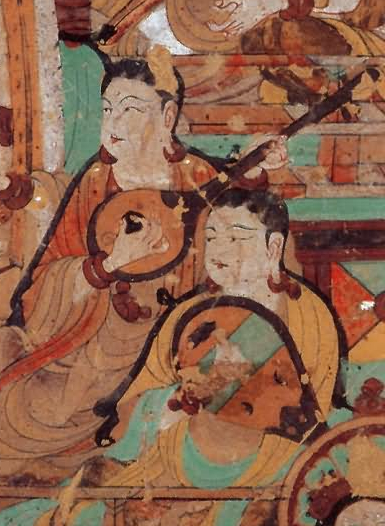
Possible sanxian (left) and pipa, from a 762-827 A.D. painting in the Mogao caves near Dunhuang―Grotto 46 Left interior wall, second panel. Also called cave 112.

The sanxian has a dry, somewhat percussive tone and loud volume similar to the banjo. The larger sizes have a range of three octaves. It is primarily used as an accompanying instrument, as well as in ensembles and orchestras of traditional Chinese instruments, though solo pieces and concertos also exist. The sanxian is used in nanguan and Jiangnan sizhu ensembles, as well as many other folk and classical ensembles—such as Suzhou pingtan, and Beijing and Kunqu operas. Iterations of the sanxian are found among China's ethnic minorities as well, such as the Manchu, the Mongols, the Bai, the Yi, the Lahu, the Miao, the Dai, and the Jingpo. The instrument's rounded rectangular resonator has a snakeskin front and back, and the curved-back pegbox at the end of the neck has lateral, or side, tuning pegs that adjust three silk, nylon or steel strings.

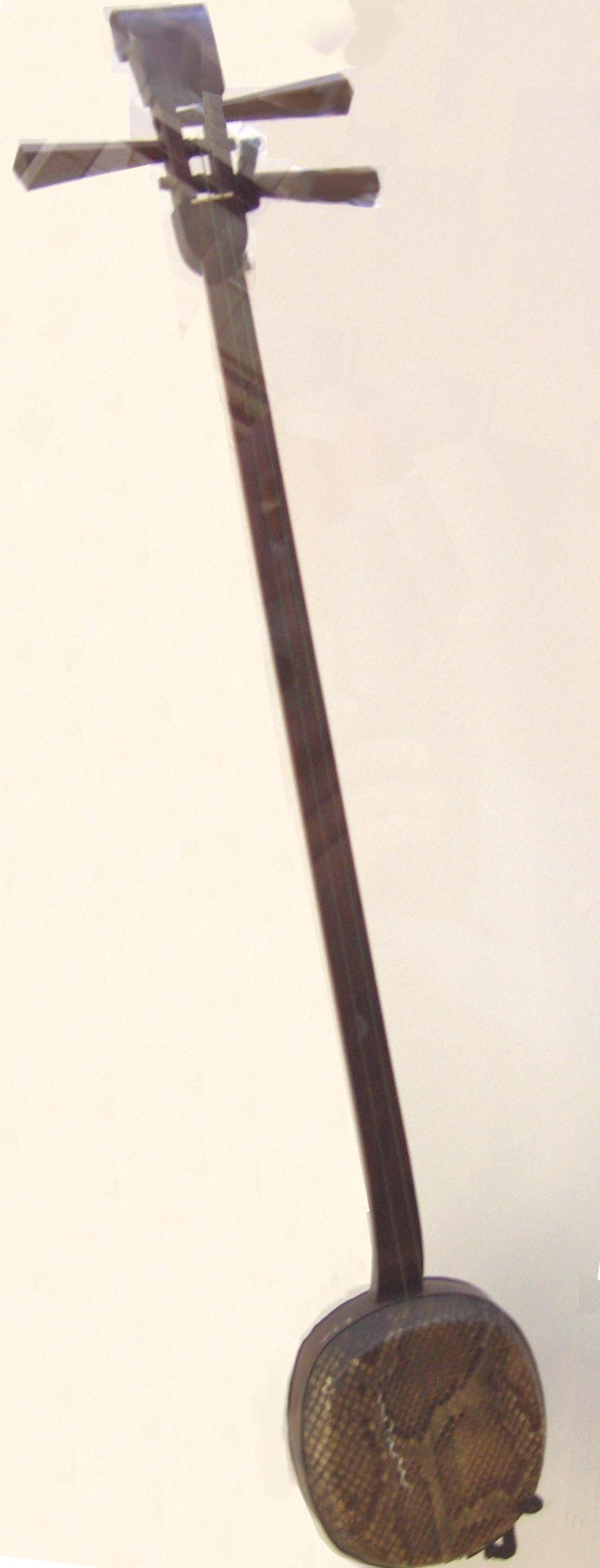
A sanxian

Traditionally, the instrument is plucked with one's fingernails—as is the case in the south of China—or with two hard and thin plectrums made from animal horn that are tied to the thumb and index finger; however, today players also use plastic pipa plectrums on all five fingers of the right hand. The usage of fingernails, or pipa plectrums, allows pipa techniques—such as the tremolo—to be applied to the sanxian, as well as the performance of works traditionally written for the pipa. Other techniques for sanxian include the use of harmonics and hitting the skin of the instrument with the plectra or fingernail (comparable to the technique used to play the northern Japanese tsugaru-jamisen). In contemporary times, sanxian players popularly use steel strings, which are composed of drawn steel—with bass and tenor strings having an additional outer coat of nylon or copper winding; alternatively, players may opt to use fishing line, pure nylon strings, or silk for a mellower tone, such as in the tradition of Suzhou Pingtan.

A closely related musical instrument is the Japanese shamisen, which originated from the Chinese sanxian. Even more closely related is the Okinawan sanshin, which is also covered in snakeskin. Additionally, the sanshin and sanxian share a structurally similar body part consisting of a round-edged square of wood. In the Japanese shamisen, the body (sao) is made of four pieces of wood instead of one. The Mongolian shanz and the Vietnamese đàn tam are also similar to the sanxian.

In addition to its use in traditional and classical Chinese music, some popular and rock musicians have used the sanxian, most notably the singer He Yong (何勇) and his father He Yusheng (何玉声). Sometimes, sanxian can be bowed with a violin bow.

== Tuning ==
- Small sanxian: A-d-a or d-a-d1, Length: 95 cm (37 in)
- Large sanxian: G-d-g, Length: 122 cm (48 in)

== Notable sanxian players ==
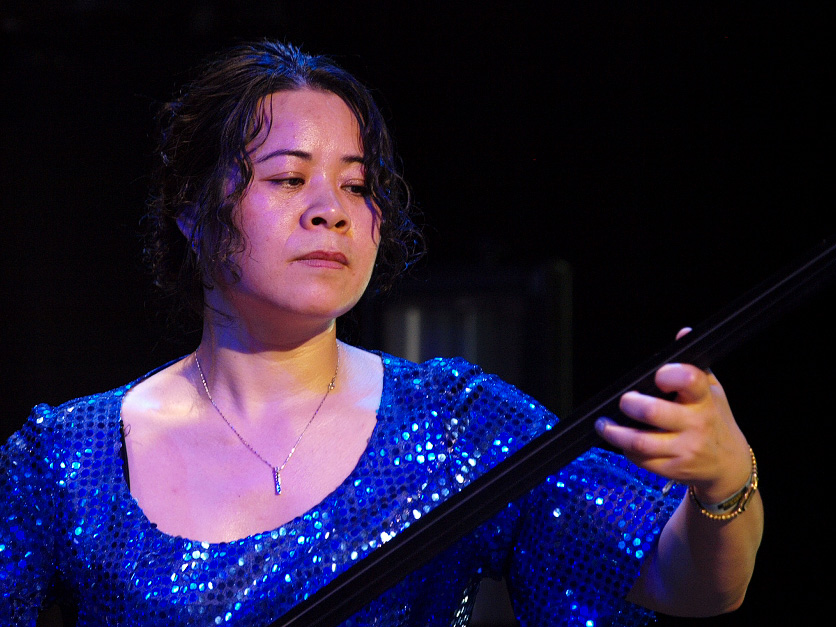
Xu Fengxia playing sanxian

- Li Yi
- Xu Fengxia
- Zhao Taisheng
- Huang Guifang
- Ni Ni

== Related instruments ==
- Xianzi (弦子) – diminutive, either a dialect word and just the same as a normal sanxian, or a southern version with a shorter neck. But in Tibet the Chinese word xianzi refers to a two-string version of the Chinese sanxian.
- Erxianzi (二弦子) – sanxian with two strings
- Pipa – four strings and a pear-shaped body

== See also ==
- Sanshin
- Shamisen
- Shanz
- Đàn tam
- Traditional Chinese musical instruments
