= Tovshuur =

Western Mongolian traditional string instrument

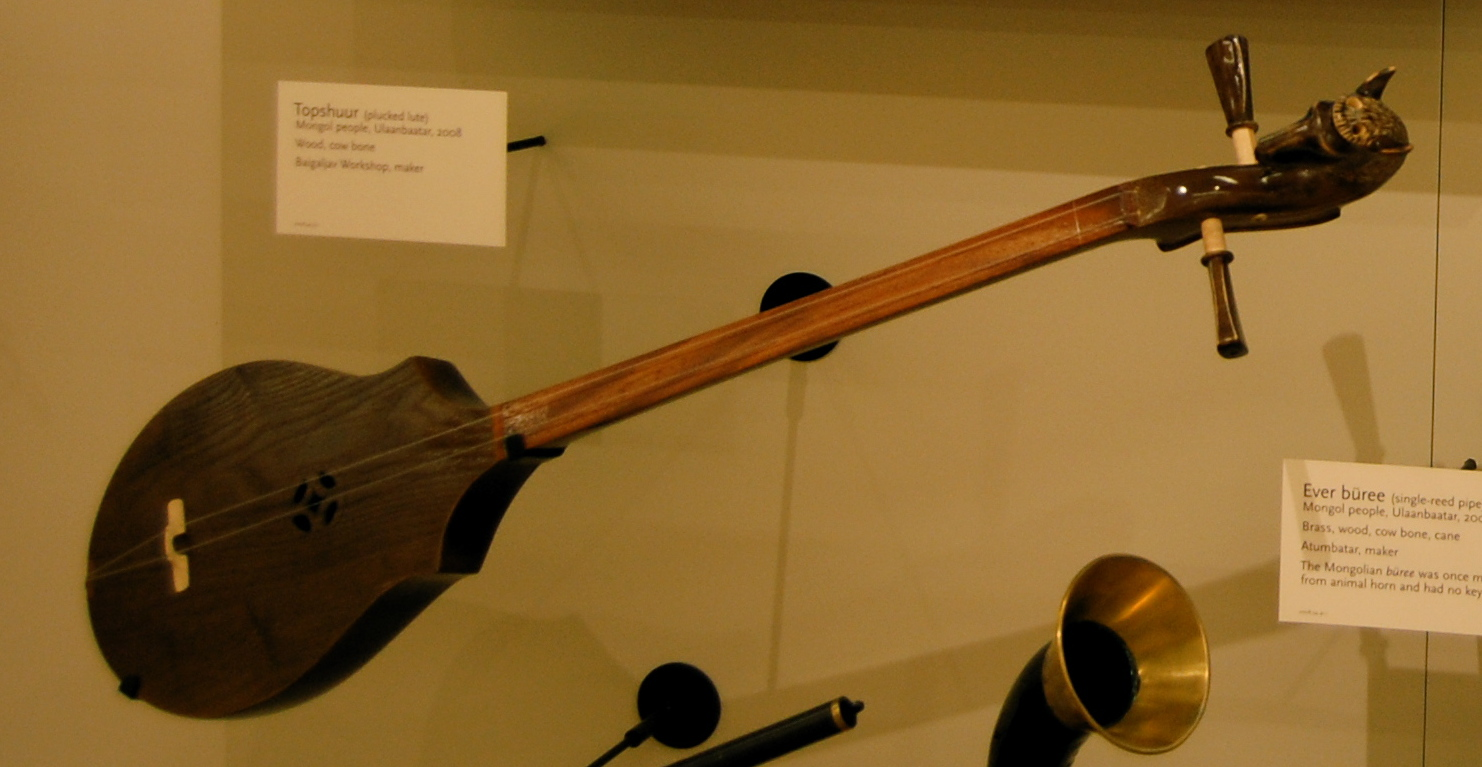
- Mongolian Tovshuur

String instrument
- Other names: Tovshuur, Topshuur, Topshur, Toshpulúr, Tavshur
- Classification: Plucked string instrument
- Hornbostel–Sachs classification: 321.321 (Necked bowl lutes)

Related instruments
- Komuz, Dombra, Doshpuluur, Balalaika, Sanxian

Musicians
- Temuulen Naranbaatar (The HU), Batzorig Vaanchig, Altai Kai

The tovshuur, also known as topshur or topshuur (Mongolian Cyrillic: товшуур; Mongolian: ᠲᠣᠪᠰᠢᠭᠤᠷ, romanized: tobshiğur; Mandarin Chinese: 托布秀尔 Tuō bù xiù ěr) is a two- or three-stringed lute played by the Western Mongolian (Oirats) tribes called the Altai Urianghais, the Altais, Tuvans, and Khalkha peoples. The topshur is closely tied to the folklore of Western Mongolian people and accompanied the performances of storytellers, singing, and dancing. According to descriptions given by Marco Polo, the Mongols also played the instruments before a battle.

== Construction and design ==
All tovshuur are homemade, and, because of this, the materials and shape of the tovshuur vary depending on the builder and the region. For example, depending on the tribe, the string might be made of horsehair or sheep intestine. The body of the tovshuur is bowl-shaped and usually covered in tight animal skin. The Kalmykian tovshuur's form is more similar to that of the Kazakh Dombra

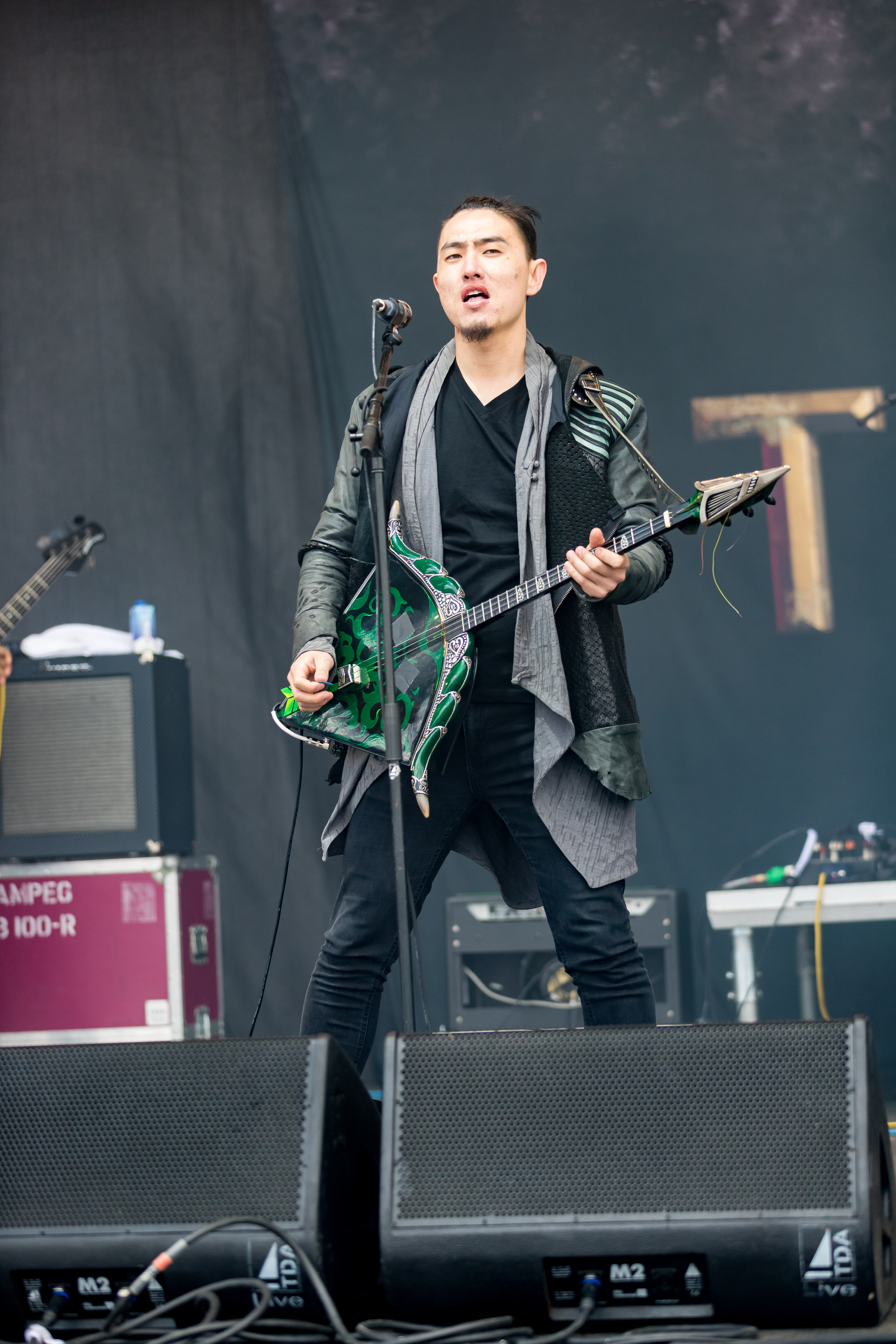
Temuulen "Temka" Naranbaatar of the Hu playing the tovshuur

== See also ==
- Tsuur
- Igil
- Doshpuluur
- Morin khuur
- Music of Tuva
- Music of Mongolia
- List of Mongolian musical instruments
