= Morin khuur =

Traditional Mongolian bowed string instrument

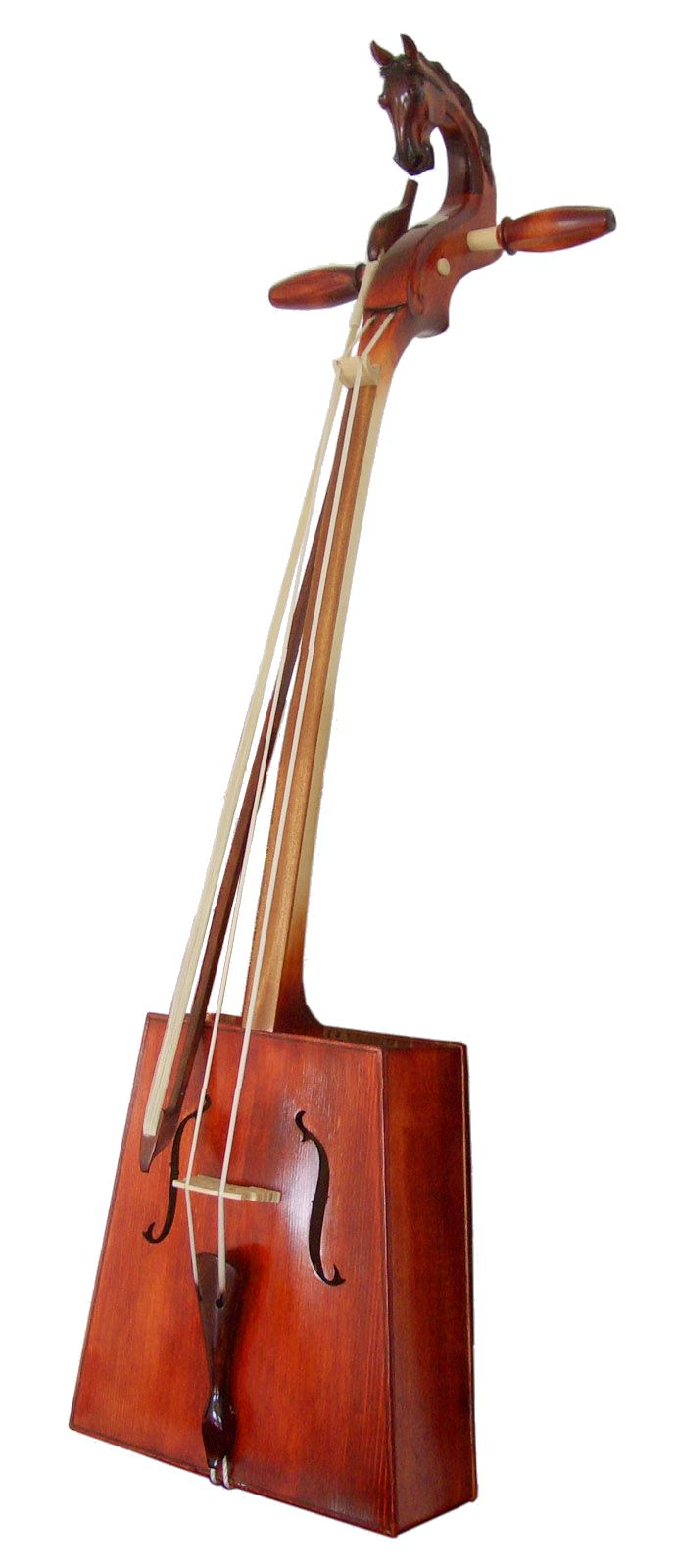

String instrument
- Other names: Шоор (Shoor), Икил (Ikil)
- Classification: Bowed string instrument
- Hornbostel–Sachs classification: 321.312 (Spike box lutes)

Related instruments
- Byzaanchy, Igil, Kobyz, Gusle

Sound sample
- "Buyant Altai Khairkhan" (Altai Khairkhan, 2000) The sound of a morin khuur

More articles or information
- Music of Mongolia

Traditional music of the Morin Khuur
- UNESCO Intangible Cultural Heritage
- Country: Mongolia
- Reference: 00068
- Region: Asia and the Pacific

Inscription history
- Inscription: 2008 (3rd session)
- List: Representative

The morin khuur (Mongolian: морин хуур,ᠮᠥᠷᠢᠨ
ᠬᠣᠭᠣᠷ, Mongolian pronunciation: [mɔ̙ɾɪ̆ɴ χʊ̙ːr̥]；Mandarin Chinese: 马头琴 Mǎ tóu qín), also known as the horsehead fiddle, is a traditional Mongolian bowed string instrument. It is one of the most important musical instruments of the Mongol people, and is considered a symbol of the nation of Mongolia. The morin khuur is one of the Masterpieces of the Oral and Intangible Heritage of Humanity identified by UNESCO.

== Name ==
In Mongolian, the instrument is usually called morin khuur [mɔrin xʊːr] or "horse fiddle".

The full Classical Mongolian name for the morin khuur is morin toloğay’ta quğur, (which in modern Khalkh cyrillic is Морин толгойтой хуур) meaning fiddle with a horse's head. Usually it is abbreviated as "Морин хуур", Latin transcription "Morin huur". In western Mongolia it is known as ikil (Mongolian: икил—not to be confused with the similar Tuvan igil)—while in eastern Mongolia it is known as shoor (Mongolian: Шоор).

== Construction ==
The instrument consists of a trapeziform wooden-framed sound box to which two strings are attached. It is held nearly upright with the sound box in the musician's lap or between the musician's legs. The strings are made from hairs from nylon or horses' tails, strung parallel, and run over a wooden bridge on the body up a long neck, past a second smaller bridge, to the two tuning pegs in the scroll, which is usually carved into the form of a horse's head.

The bow is loosely strung with horse hair coated with larch or cedar wood resin, and is held from underneath with the right hand. The underhand grip enables the hand to tighten the loose hair of the bow, allowing very fine control of the instrument's timbre.

Originally, the larger of the two strings (the "male" string) was made up of 130 hairs from a stallion's tail, while the "female" string has 105 hairs from a mare's tail, although modern strings are often made of nylon. Traditionally, the strings were tuned a fifth apart, though in modern music they are more often tuned a fourth apart, usually to B-flat and F. The strings are stopped either by pinching them in the joints of the index and middle fingers, or by pinching them between the nail of the little finger and the pad of the ring finger.

Traditionally, the frame is covered with camel, goat, or sheep skin, in which case a small opening would be left in the back. However, since the 1970s, new completely wooden sound box instruments have appeared, with carved f-holes similar to European string instruments.

A beginner-grade morin khuur typically features a pine top with birch or laminated back and sides. In contrast, player-grade morin khuur is crafted from higher quality tonewoods, such as spruce for the top and birch for the back and sides. Some instruments, particularly those intended for classical music, use maple for the back and sides to produce a brighter sound.

The modern standard height is 1.15 m (3 ft 9 in); the distance between the upper bridge and the lower bridge is about 60 cm (24 in), but the upper bridge especially can be adapted to match smaller player's fingers. The sound box usually has a depth of 8–9 cm (3.1–3.5 in); the width of the soundbox is about 20 cm (7.9 in) at the top and 25 cm (9.8 in) at the bottom. Good quality instruments can achieve a strength of 85 dBA, which allows it to be played (if desired) even in mezzoforte or crescendo. When horsehair is used, the luthiers prefer to use the hair of white stallions. In general the quality of a horse hair string depends several factors, including its preparation, the climate conditions and the nutrition of the animals, resulting in a wide range of quality.

Quality nylon strings (Khalkh Mongolian: сатуркан хялгас) last for up to 2 years, but only if prepared and placed properly on the instrument. Most beginners don't comb the strings, resulting in quick deterioration of sound quality. Good strings nearly sound like steel strings, and in spectrograms they show about 7-8 harmonics.

Morin khuur vary in form depending on region. Instruments from central Mongolia tend to have larger bodies and thus develop higher amplitude (i.e. they sound louder) than the smaller-bodied instruments of Inner Mongolia. In addition, the Inner Mongolian instruments have mostly mechanics for tightening the strings, where Mongolian luthiers mostly use traditional ebony or rosewood pegs in a slightly conic shape.

== Origin ==
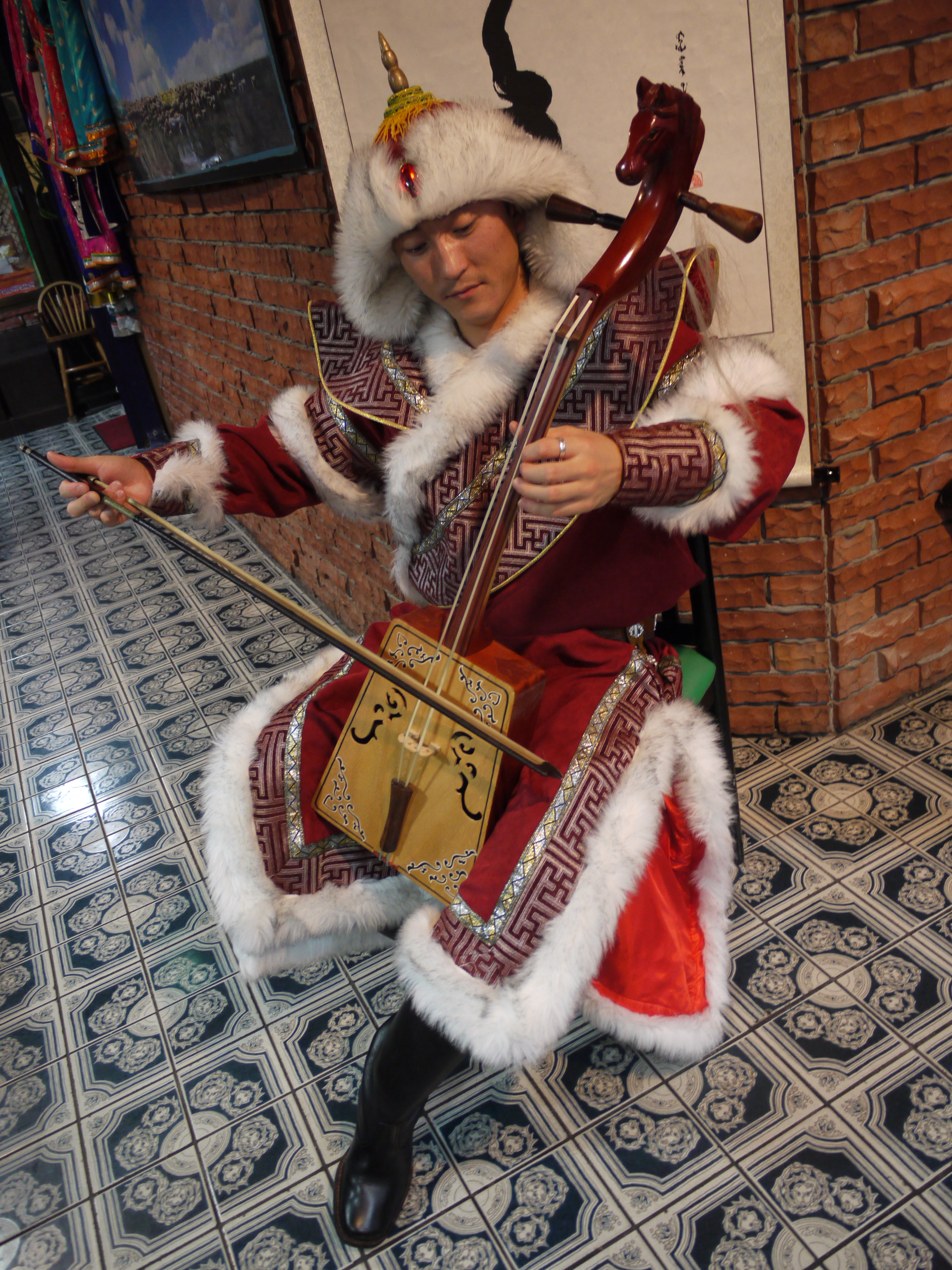
Morin khuur, Inner Mongolian style in China

One legend about the origin of the morin khuur is that a shepherd named Namjil the Cuckoo (or Khuhuu Namjil) received the gift of a flying horse; he would mount it at night and fly to meet his beloved. A jealous woman had the horse's wings cut off so that the horse fell from the air and died. The grieving shepherd made a horsehead fiddle from the now-wingless horse's skin and tail hair and used it to play poignant songs about his horse.

Another legend credits the invention of the morin khuur to a boy named Sükhe (or Suho). After a wicked lord slew the boy's prized white horse, the horse's spirit came to Sükhe in a dream and instructed him to make an instrument from the horse's body, so the two could still be together and neither would be lonely. So the first morin khuur was assembled, with horse bones as its neck, horsehair strings, horse skin covering its wooden soundbox, and its scroll carved into the shape of a horse head.

The fact that most of the eastern Turkic neighbors of the Mongols possess similar horse hair instruments (such as the Tuvan igil, the Kazakh kobyz, or the Kyrgyz Kyl kyyak), though not western Turkic, is a testament to the shared musical heritage across the various Khanates that mutually ruled these people.

The gusle/lahuta from Southeastern Europe (Serbia, Croatia & Albania) is a very similar instrument, and may have been brought along trade routes that both Mongolia and the Balkans shared. Often these instruments are depicted with a goat head instead of a horse in Europe.

== Playing technique ==
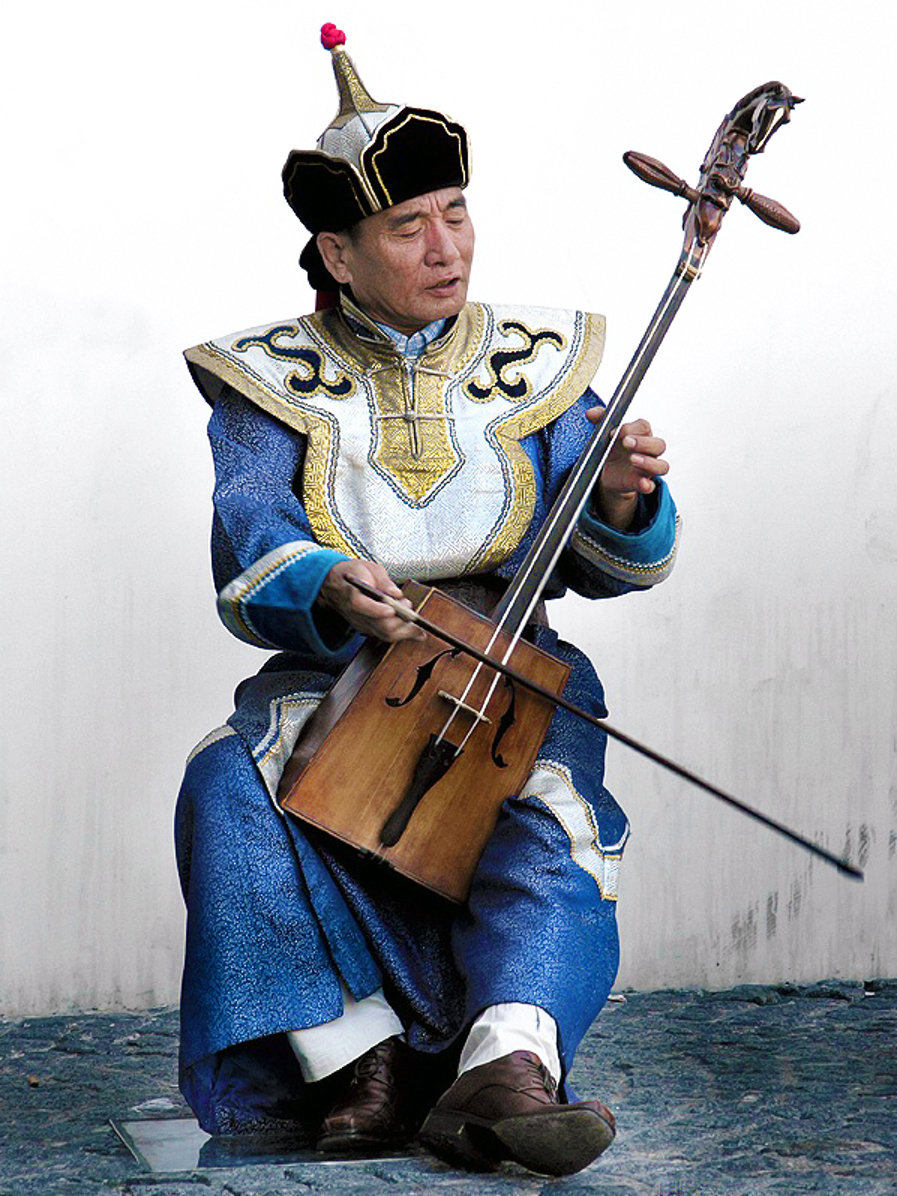
Sambuugiin Pürevjav of Altai Khairkhan performing in Paris (2005).

The modern style Morin Khuur is played with nearly natural finger positions. That means, the distance between two fingers usually make the distance of a half tone on the lower section of the instrument. On the tune F / B♭ the index finger hits on the low (F) string the G, the middle finger hits the G♯, the ring finger hits the A, the little finger the B flat. Identical positions are on the high strings - C, C♯, D, D♯. The little finger tips the B strings under the F string, while all other fingers touch the strings from the top.

Melodies are usually played from F to F' on the F string, then the player switches to the B♭ string and continues with G, A, B♭. There are 3 hand positions on the F string, and 2 positions on the B♭ strings a musician must memorize. The idea is that without moving the string hand too much the sound quality improves. The 2nd hand position on the B string is used to play C, D, E♭, then moves a little bit for hitting the F' with the little finger, then without moving the G position can be reached with the 1st finger.

It is also possible to touch the B♭ string with the thumb to get a C, and use the ring finger under the F string to achieve the D♯.

On the F strings only the first harmonic is used, so the scale ranges from F to F'. On the B♭ strings several harmonics are available: B♭', F", B", also often players accompanying the F' on the F string with an F" overtone at the F' position on the B♭ string.

Some parts of the bowing technique is unique - the little and the ring finger of the right hand usually touch the bow hair, which is used for setting accents. The other two fingers maintain a slight pressure on the strings. A common technique with other string instruments is the "Kist". When the bow direction changes, the right hand moves a little bit in advance to the opposite direction to avoid scratchy sounds and for achieving a better voice. When pushing the bow the hand closes a little bit in direction of a fist, when pulling it the hand opens - nearly to a right angle between the arm and the fingers.

The instrument can be used for playing western style classical music, or Mongolian style pieces. The primary education is to learn the scales, to train the ear for achieving the "muscle memory", the ability to automatically adapt the finger position when a note wasn't hit properly. The main goal is to achieve a "clear" sound, that means no change in volume or frequency is desired. That depends on three main facts:

- finger force used for touching the strings
- pressure of the bow
- constant sound after bow direction changes

As variation are usually used the "accent" and the "vibrato". Other techniques like the "Col legno", the "Pizzicato" or the "Martellato" are generally not used on the Morin Huur.

Because of its standard tune to Bb and F mostly western music is transposed for being played in one of the four most common scales: F major, F minor, B♭ Major, E♭ major. When used as a solo instrument the Morin Huur is often tuned a half tone higher or lower.

Nearly all of the Mongolian style pieces are in F minor, and often the instrument is tuned 1-2 notes lower for coming closer to the tunes used in the deep past. The instruments in the pre-socialist era of Mongolia were usually covered with skin, which mostly doesn't allow the Bb and F tune - usually tuned 2-4 notes deeper.

On the contemporary Morin Khuur the deep string is placed at the right side and the high string is placed at the left side, seen from the front of the instrument. The Igil has the opposite placement of strings, so a player has to adapt in order to play pieces made for the other one. For contemporary teaching the modern style is in use.

== Education ==
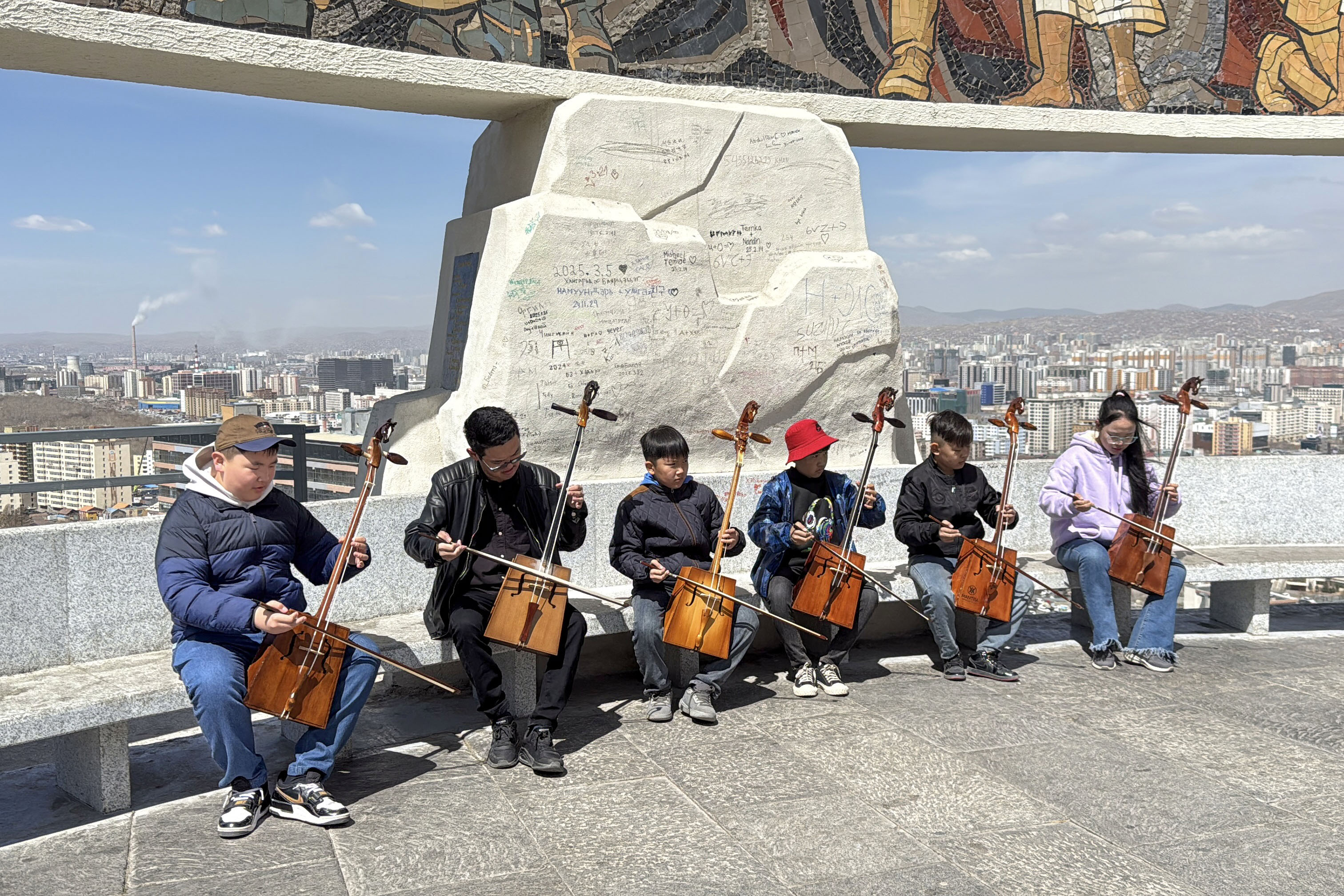
Students playing the morin khuur at the Zaisan Memorial, Ulaanbaatar.

In Mongolia, the morin khuur can be learned at three schools:

- The SUIS (соёлын урлагын их сургууль), Engl. "University of Arts and Culture". Here, students enter in adult age for obtaining a bachelor's degree after 2 years and a master's degree after 5 years of musical education. After the master's degree, the students are considered to be professional musicians, and can play at one of the state ensembles or later become a teacher at the SUIS.
- Mongolian State Conservatory (Монгол Улсын Консерватори). Accepting students who are not older than 10 years old for the morin khuur class at the conservatory and since September 2017, the conservatory has been offering a Bachelor of Music and a Master of Music in Morin Khuur Performance degree.
- The culture school of the SUIS (СУИСы, соёлын сургууль). Here several qualification courses are available. Graduates from this school mostly become teachers or enter the SUIS.

Also many amateur players acquired reasonable skills by taking lessons from private teachers, or being taught by their parents or other relatives.

== Cultural influence ==
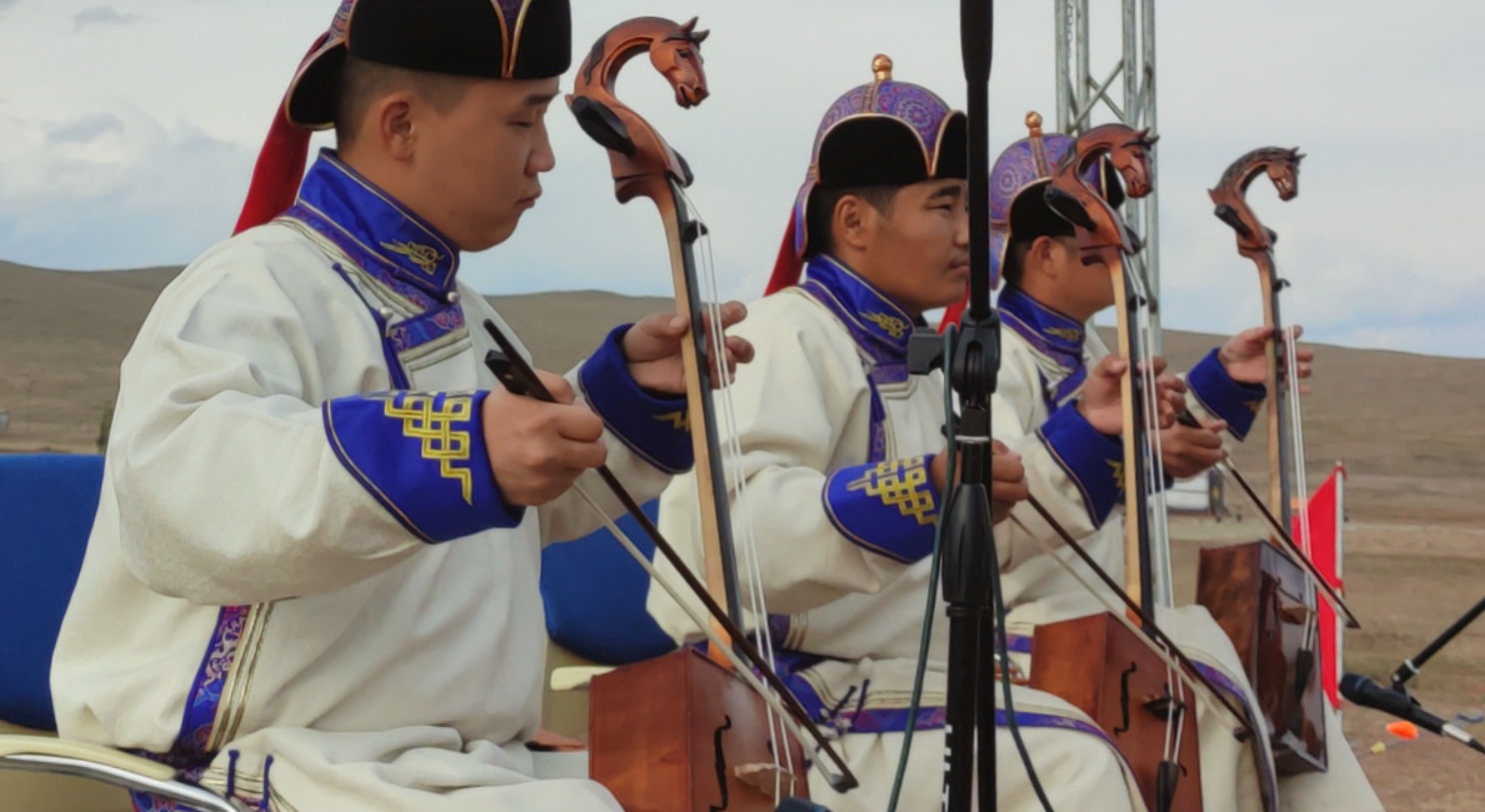
Mongolian musicians play the morin khur

The morin khuur is the national instrument in Mongolia. Many festivals are held for celebrating the importance of this instrument on the Mongolian culture, like the biannual "International Morin Huur Festival and Competition", which is organized by the "World Morinhuur Association". First held in 2008, second in 2010 - with 8 participating countries (Mongolia, Korea, China, Russia, USA, Germany, France, Japan) - and planned for May 2012. Here, many amateurs come and play freestyle pieces, but also a professional contest is held and an instrument making competition.

During June, the "Roaring Hooves" festival is held. This is a small closed festival for professional skilled players. Recordings are often shown in TV reports later.

On the national festival "Naadam" praise songs are played for the most magnificent horse and for the highest ranked wrestler and archer. The songs are called "Magtaal" and accompanied by a unique style of praise and playing.

Many Mongolians have the instrument in their home because it is a symbol for peace and happiness.

During the winter time and also at the beginning of the spring time, a morin khuur player is called in for the "жавар үргээх", the "ceremony for scaring away the frost". In general, many traditional pieces are played, divided in the different styles: "уртын дуу", "urtiin duu" (long song), "магтаал", "magtaal" (praise songs) and "татлага", "tatlaga" (solo pieces, mostly imitating horses or camels).

The fourth style, the "биелгее" is rarely played in these ceremonies, but in western Mongolia it is common for accompanying "tatlaga dancing" in 3 times - like a waltz, but with dance movements imitating daily tasks of a nomad's family.

A number of folk metal and folk rock bands from Mongolia and the Chinese autonomous region of Inner Mongolia have combined heavy metal and rock music with traditional Mongolian lyrical themes and instruments, including the morin khuur; some of these bands include Altan Urag, Nine Treasures, Tengger Cavalry, Hanggai, the Hu, and Uuhai.

== Animal psychological healing use by Gobi Desert farmers ==
In the Mongolian Gobi herder's daily life, the Morin Khuur has another important use. When a mother camel gives birth to a calf, sometimes she rejects her calf due to various natural stress situations. Mongolian camel herders use Morin Khuur-based melodies alongside special low-harmonic types of songs called "Khoosloh" to heal the mother camel's stress and encourage her to re-adopt her calf. While re-adoption in animal husbandry practice is widely used in various nomadic civilizations worldwide, uniquely for Mongolian Gobi herders, only this instrument is used with camels. If a mother camel dies after giving birth to a calf, the herder would use this Khoosloh technique alongside Morin Khuur melodies to encourage another mother camel who has her own calf to adopt the new one. The practice is well documented in the documentary called Ingen Egshig directed by Badraa J. in 1986 and was also remade in 2003 by director Byambasuren Davaa with a different title of The Story of the Weeping Camel which was nominated in 2005 Academy Award for Best Documentary.

== See also ==
- Batzorig Vaanchig
- Kobyz
- Music of Mongolia
- List of Mongolian musical instruments
- Topshur

== Bibliography ==
- Marsh, Peter K. (2004). Horse-Head Fiddle and the Cosmopolitan Reimagination of Mongolia. ISBN 0-415-97156-X.
- Santaro, Mikhail (1999). Морин Хуур - Хялгасны эзэрхийгч, available in cyrillic (ISBN 99929-5-015-3) and classical Mongolian script (ISBN 7-80506-802-X)
- Luvsannorov, Erdenechimeg (2003) Морин Хуурын арга билгийн арванхоёр эгшиглэн, ISBN 99929-56-87-9
- Pegg, Carole (2003) Mongolian Music, Dance, and Oral Narrative: Recovering Performance Traditions (with audio CD) ISBN 978-0-295-98112-3
