= List of Asian folk music traditions =

This is a list of Asian folk music traditions, with styles, dances, instruments and other related topics. The term folk music can not be easily defined in a precise manner; it definitions depending on the author, and on audience and context within a work. Similarly, the term traditions in this context does not connote any strictly defined criteria. Music scholars, journalists, audiences, record industry individuals, politicians, nationalists and demagogues may often have occasion to address which fields of folk music are distinct traditions based along racial, geographic, linguistic, religious, tribal or ethnic lines, and all such peoples will likely use different criteria to decide what constitutes a "folk music tradition". This list uses the same general categories used by mainstream, primarily English-language, scholarly sources, as determined by relevant statements of fact and the internal structure of works.

These traditions may coincide entirely, partially or not at all with geographic, political, linguistic or cultural boundaries. Very few, if any, music scholars would claim that there are any folk music traditions that can be considered specific to a distinct group of people and with characteristics undiluted by contact with the music of other peoples; thus, the folk music traditions described herein overlap in varying degrees with each other.

== East Asia ==
Country	Elements	Dance	Instrumentation	Other topics
Ainu	rekuhkara - upopo - yukar	bear ceremony	Ainu fiddle - mukkuri - pararayki - tonkori	
China	Chinese opera - chuigushou - Guandong - jiangnan sizhu - nanguan		banhu - bawu - dizi - erhu - gaohu - gong - guan - guqin - guzheng - huqin - konghou - mangtong - pipa - ruan - sheng - suona - xiao - xindi - xun - yangqin - zhonghu - zhongruan	shijing - yuefu
Japan			biwa - koto - shakuhachi - shamisen - taiko	
Korea	chongak - jeongak - nongak - pansori - pungmul - salpuri - sanjo - sinawi -		ajaeng - buk - daegeum - danso - gayageum - geomungo - haegeum - janggu - piri - taepyeongso	
Ryukyuan/ Okinawan	koten - min'yō - uzagaku - warabe uta - yunta	eisā - kachāshī	fue - hyōshigi - kūchō - kutu - pāranku - sanba - sanshin	
Mongolian	bogino-duu - duulah - epic song - ger - häälah - holboo - aman huur - magtel - türleg - urtyn duu - throat-singing: isgeree - karkhiraa - khöömii	biyelgee - tsam - yokhor	dörvon chihtei huur - flute - khuuchir - igil - ikil - khel khuur - limbe - morin khuur - pyzanchy - shanz - tsuur - toshpulur - yatga	üliger - Ge-sar
Tibetan	hua'er - lhamo - lu	cham dance - sword dance	dramnyen - dung chen - gyümang - lingbu - piwang - rag-dung - rgya-gling	Ge-sar - Gelgpa
Yunnan	baisha xiyue - dongjing -	lezuo	bawu - hulusi - hulusheng - lusheng - mabu - tuhu	

== Southeast Asia ==
Country	Elements	Dance	Instrumentation	Other topics
Batak	gendan keteng-keteng - gendang lima sedalanen - gondang		bonang - garantung - gendang - gordang - hasapi - hesek - kendbang - keteng-keteng - kulcapi - mangkuk - ogung - taganing - trompong - sulim - sarune	
Burmese	byaw - mahagita - hsaing waing		hne - migyaung - palwe - pattala - pat waing - saung gauk	nat pwe
Dayak			gong	
Filipino	kulintang - agung - rondalla - kundiman - gangsa - laji - gabbang tahta - luguh - lelling - kalangan - saunay	singkil - pangalay bumayah - tinikling - janggay - asik - itik-itik - binasuan sublian - maglalatik banog salisid kadal tahaw - kadal blelah - karatong pagapir - kapa malong malong	kulintang - agung - dabakan - kutiyapi - sarunai - suling - kubing - gangsa - guitar - biyula - gabbang - kubing - hegelung - violin - cello - octavina - rondalla - kendang - gambus	
Hmong	gaeng		lusheng	
Indonesian	ketuk tilu - kroncong - langgam jawa	ronggeng - tapanuli ogong	agung - angklung - bedug - bonang - cak - calung - cekuntrung - cuk - cello - celumpung - gangsa - genggong - gong - guitar - kacapi - karinding - kecer - kecrek - kempul - kemanak - kendang - kepyak - ketuk - kongahyan - kulintang - mirwas - moko - qanbūs - rebab - rebana - reyong - ronggeng - saluang - sasando - slentho - suling - talempong - ugal - violin	komedi stambul - pelog
Karen			flute - gong - xylophone - zither	
Khmer	jariang - cho-kantrum - ruem-trosh - ayai - kam nap - pleing kar	ramvong	ching - krab - pinpeat - tro	
Lao	lam luang - lam phi fa - lam pun - lam tan san - lam tan yao - lam toei - mor khaen - mor lam - mor lam dio - mor lam mu - mor lam pee fah - sarup - soeng - tet lae - wai khru	lamvong	ching - khaen - khui - phin - ranat - so	
Lun Bawang / Orang Ulu	bamboo band		keluré - sapé	
Malaysian	asi - ronggeng - Dikir barat	accordion - joget - zapin	violin - gambus - Gendang - kompang - rebana - Seruling - Serunai - Biola - Rebab - Beduk - Gedombak - Geduk - Gendang Jawa - Maruas - Jidur - Nahara - Angklung - Bonang - cak lempong - Canang - Pipa - YangQin - Sheng - erhu - Sitar - tampura - venna - dholo	
Thai	bong lang - lam tad - likay - nang taloon - pii klong - pleng choi	fon - ramwong	angklung - grajabpi - jakhe - khaen - khim - khlui - krap - phin - pi - piphat - pong lang - ranat - sueng - wot	Ngan Wat
Vietnamese	ca tru - hat - hat chau van - hat cheo - hat noi - hat tuong - hò - gui thu - nhac dan toc cai bien - nhac tai tu - quan ho - Water puppetry	fan dance - múa nón (hat dance) - múa bài bông (lotus dance) - lantern dance - flag dance - platter dance - candle dance - incense dance	đàn bầu - đàn đáy - đàn nguyệt - đàn tranh - đàn hồ - đàn nhị - đàn tam - đàn tứ - đàn gáo - đàn tỳ bà - đàn sến - đàn tam thập lục - kèn - sáo - tiêu - phách - sênh tiền - trống cơm - trống cái - trống đế - tơ rưng	

== South Asia ==
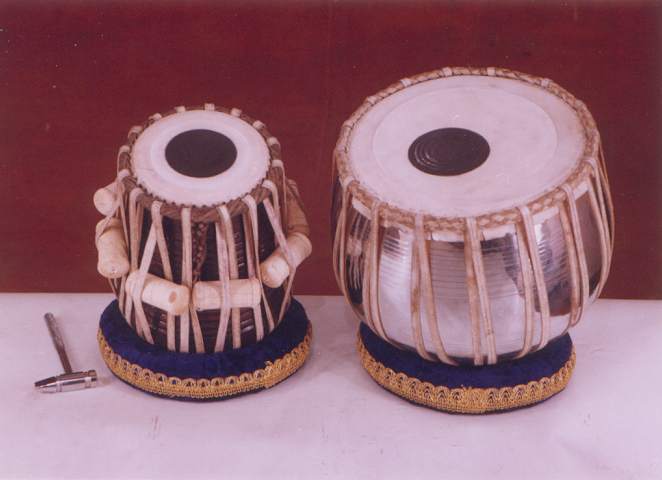
The tabla, an Indian drum

Country	Elements	Dance	Instrumentation	Other topics
Afghani / Pashto	badala - charbeta - klasik - loba - mursia - neemakai - rowzeh - rubayi - shaan - tappas	attan - khattak - zahir mashohil	dayra - dilruba - dohol - dombura - dutar - ghichak - harmonium - rubab - sitar - sorna - tabla - tambur - zerbaghali	
Baluchi		Do-Chapi - lewa	chang - dohol - ney - saz - sorud - surna - suroz - tanburag - tanbur - tar	
Baul			dotara (lute) - ektara - khamak (pitched drum) - napur (ankle rattle)	
Garo			horsehair fiddle - trumpet	
Gujarati	dandiya			
Kashmiri			sarangi	
Kerala	chenda melam - keli - Kuzhal Pattu - paandi melam - tayambaka		chenda (barrel drum) - kombu) - kuzhal - maddalam (barrel drum)	
Manipuri			Dhon Dholok Cholom - Pung Cholak - Rasa Lila - Sita Harana	
Maria		bison-horn dance - wedding dance	drum - flute	
Mru			plung	
Nepalese	panchai baja		arbajo - barrel drum - jaw harp - kettle drum - maadal - sarangi - shawm	gaine - damai
Newari	caca - Dapha - Gunla Bajan - jogi - malasri -	Lakhey - Pulukishi - Jyapu Pyaakhan	barrel drum - Dhime - flute - nava dapha - naykhin - shawm - Bhusyaa	bisket jatra
Punjabi	bhangra - dafjan - giddha	bhangra	dhol	
Rajasthani			bhapang - kamayacha - khatal - harmonium - jantar - murali - pungi - ravanhatha - sarangi - satara - surnai	Bhopa - Jogi - Langa - Manganiyar - Sapera
Santal	sohrae		dhodro banam - phet banam - tamak' - tiriwaw - tumdak'	sohrae
Sri Lankan	cantiga - kavi - kaffirinha - kolam - nadagam - nurti - sokari - virindu	bayila - Uda Rata Natum - Pahatha Rata Natum - Sabaragamuwa - Leekeli	geta beraya - hakgediya - horanawa - raban - ravanahatha - thalampata - udákkiya	
Tamil Nadu / Ancient Tamil music	urumee melam - Nayandi melam - gaana	Dappan kuthu - Kummi - Kolattam -Kavadi attam- Poikkal Kudirai (dummy horse dance) - Mayil Attam (peacock dance) - Puli Attam (tiger dance)	Urumee - Thavil - Tharrai Thappatai drum - tambourine - Nadaswaram - pullanguzhal (Carnatic flute) - Yaazh	
Uttar Pradesh	kajaris	charkula		

== Central and North Asia ==
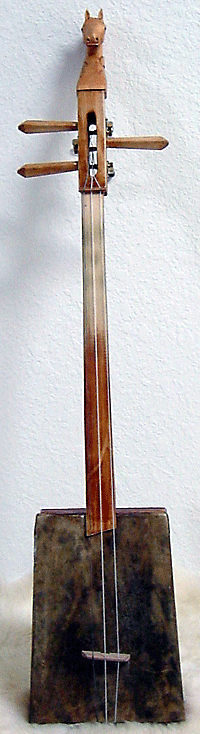
A doshpuluur, a traditional Tuvan instrument

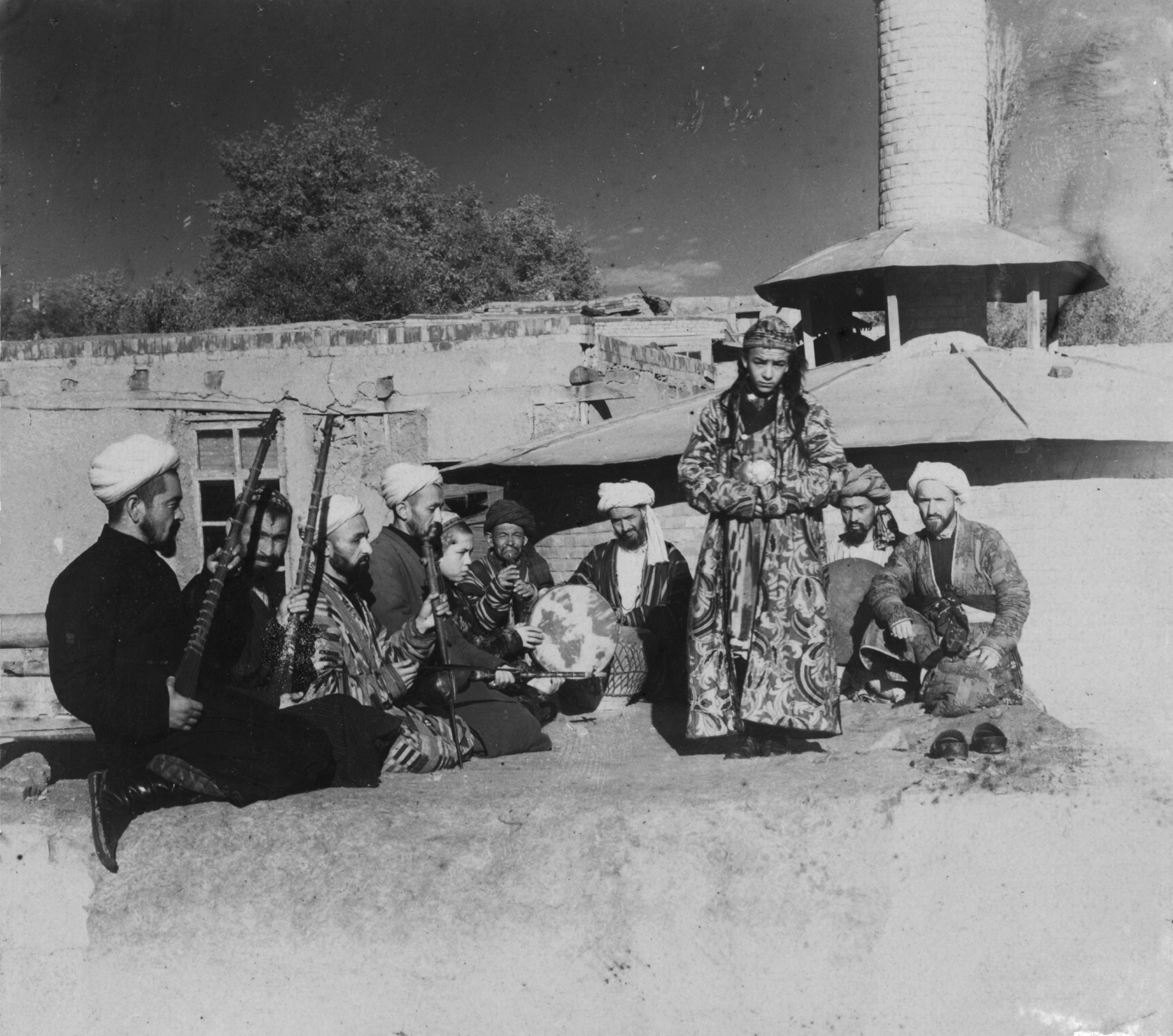
Traditional Uzbek music and dance

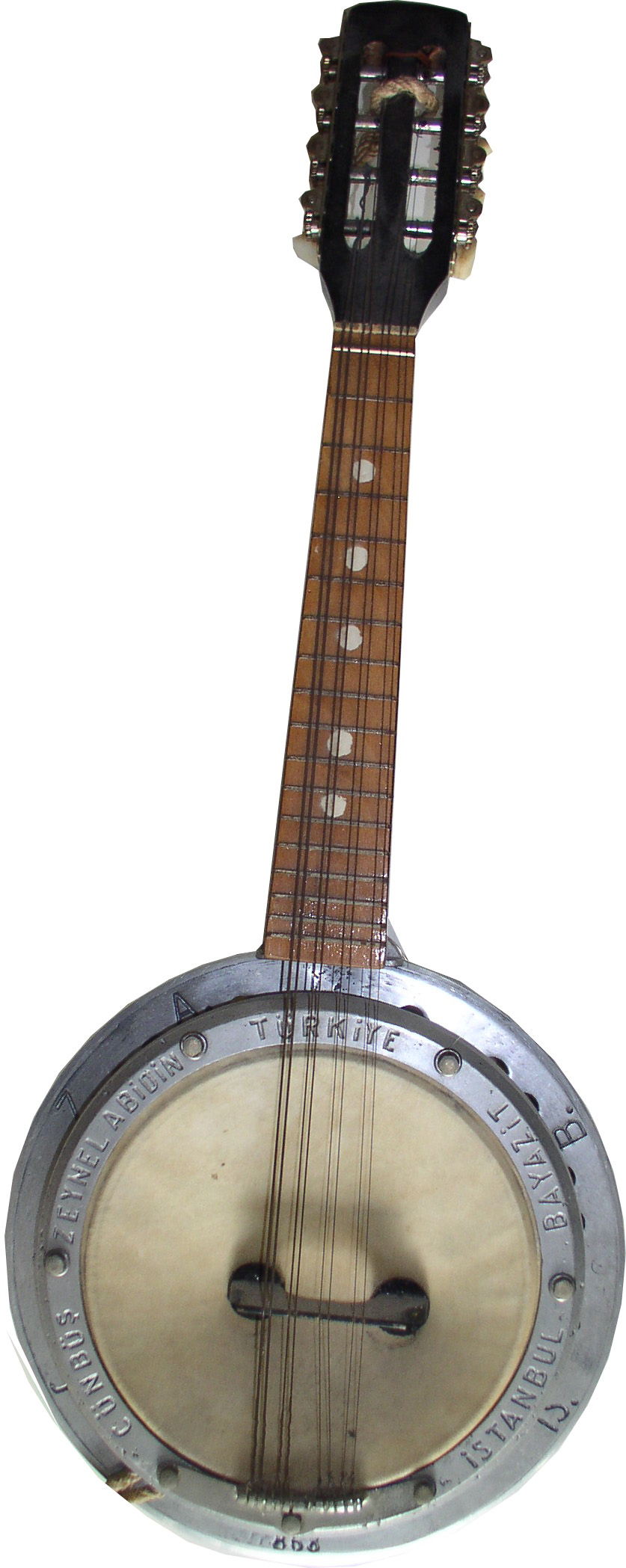
A Turkish mandolin-banjo

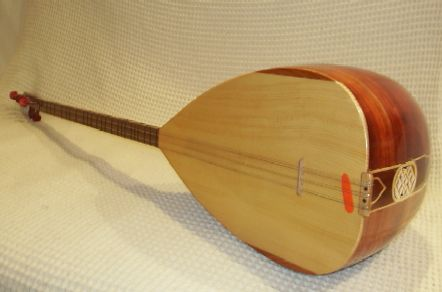
A Turkish baglama

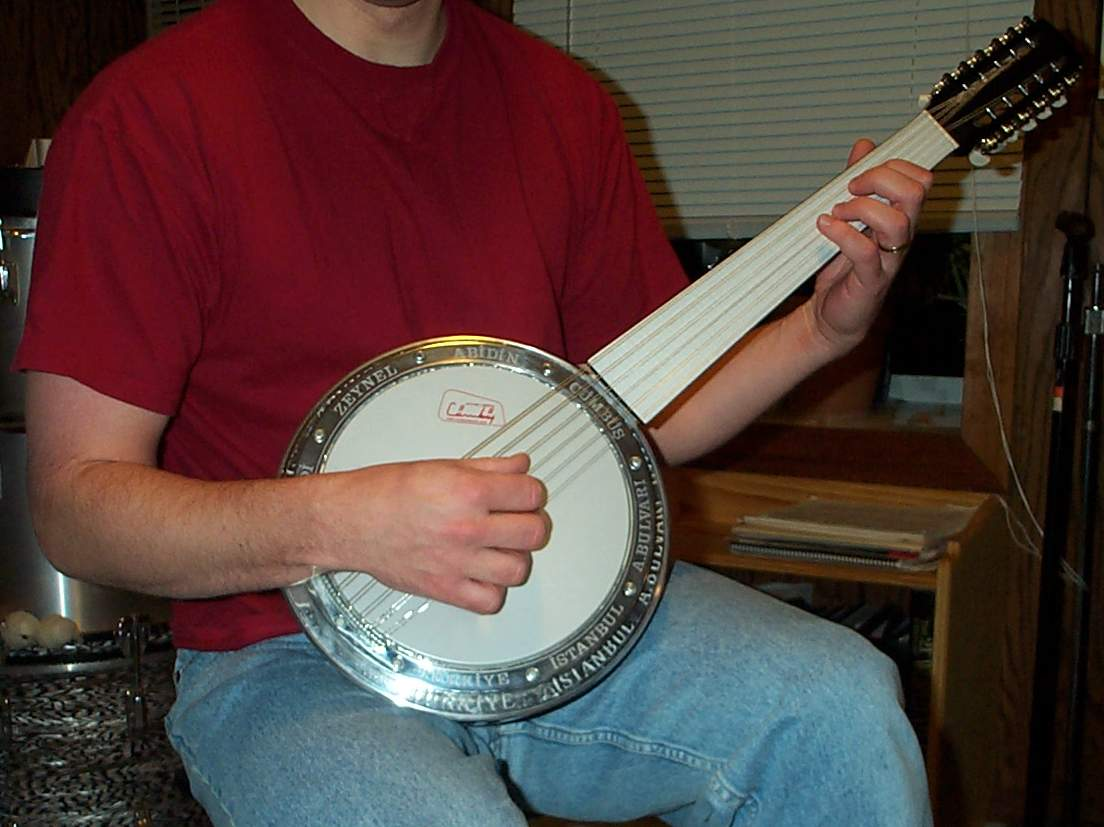
A Turkish cümbüş

Country	Elements	Dance	Instrumentation	Other topics
Armenian	ashoug	kochare - shalakho	dhol - duduk - k’anon - kemancha - sring - shvi - tar - zurna	
Azeri	ashiq - mugam		balaban - daf - gopuz - kemanche - tanbur - tar - tulum-zurna	
Kazakh	akyn - kui		dombra - kobyz - rubab - sybyzgy - tanbur - temir komuz	
Kyrgyz	kui - manaschi		chopo choor - komuz - kyl kyyak - tanbur - temir komuz	Manas
Tajik	falak - shashmaqam		dutar - gidjak - setar - tanbur	
Turkish	bozlak - koşma - türkü - uzun hava	çiftetelli – halay – horon – karsilama – köçek oyunu – semah – sword dance – zeybek kasap havası - hora -	Çığırtma - davul - darbuka - kabak kemane - kaval - kemençe - mey - ney - kanun - saz - sipsi - tar - tulum - zurna	dastan - Dede Korkut - Huseni - ashik – chengi – köçekce
Turkmen	bakshy - mukamlar		dili tuiduk - dutar - gargy-tuiduk - tanbur - tuiduk	
Tuvan	throat singing: bangnadyr - borbannadir - khoomei - khorekteer - sygyt - kargyraa		byzaanchy - chanzy - doshpuluur - igil - khomus - shoor - topshur	
Uighur	on ikki muqam - sanam		dap - dotar - kanun - ney - satar - surnei - tambur	
Uzbek	shashmaqam		chang - doira - dombra - dutar - karnay - gidjak - nay - rubab - sato - surnay - tanbur - ud	
Yakut	olonkho		khomus	
