= Agung (disambiguation) =

Agung can refer to:

- Agung or agong, a set of gongs used in Philippine music
- Agung Laksono, 15th Coordinating Minister for People's Welfare of Indonesia
- Mount Agung, a volcano in Bali
- Sultan Agung of Mataram, 17th century sultan in Central Java

== See also ==
- Yang di-Pertuan Agong, the paramount monarch of Malaysia
  - Raja Permaisuri Agong, consort to the paramount monarch of Malaysia
