= Đàn tứ =

Vietnamese stringed instrument

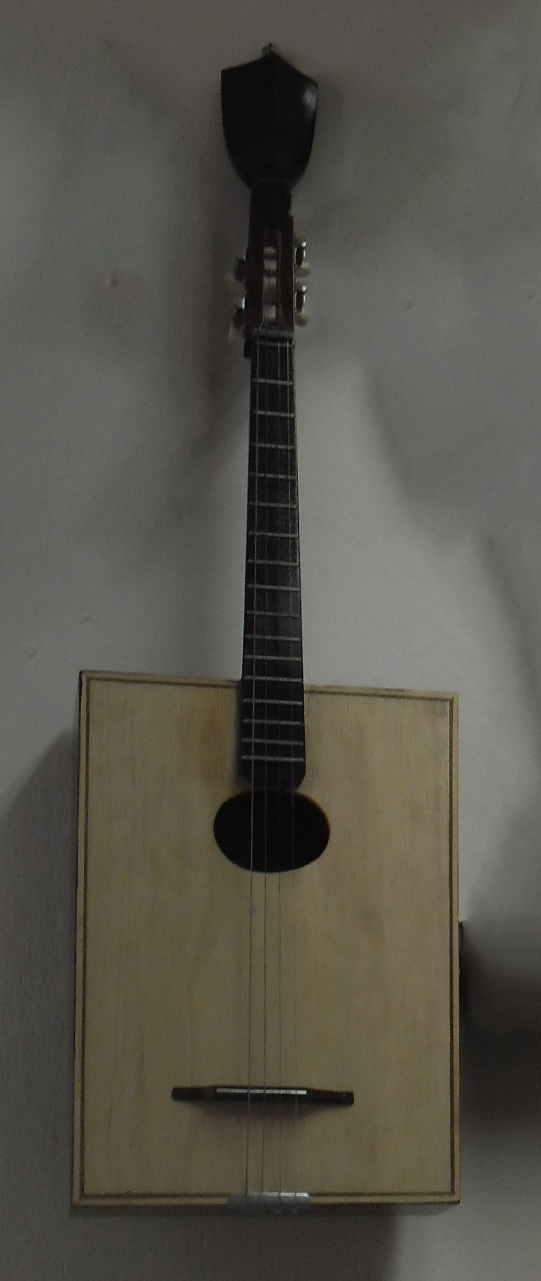
- Modernized đàn tứ with rectangular body and longer neck
- Other names: Đàn đoản

Related instruments
- Yueqin

The đàn tứ (chữ Hán: 彈四) (tứ meaning "four" in Sino-Vietnamese, referring to the instrument's number of strings), also called đàn đoản (đoản meaning "short," referring to the instrument's neck) or đàn tứ tròn (tròn meaning "round"), is a traditional Vietnamese stringed musical instrument, this is short-necked, round-bodied lute derived from the Chinese yueqin, with four strings in double courses. It is little used today.

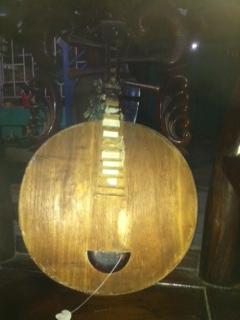
Antique đàn tứ with round body and shorter neck

A different instrument with the same name, which is similar to the Chinese zhongruan but with a rectangular or slightly trapezoidal soundbox, is used in Vietnam's tradition of nhạc dân tộc cải biên. In around the 1960s, musicians in Vietnam's conservatories improved the đàn tứ's ability to play Western-style music by creating a rectangular body with longer strings and fretting designed for the Western diatonic scale, which is also called đàn tứ thùng (thùng meaning "box") to distinguish it from the traditional đàn tứ tròn (đàn đoản). This newer instrument has become much more popular than the traditional version.

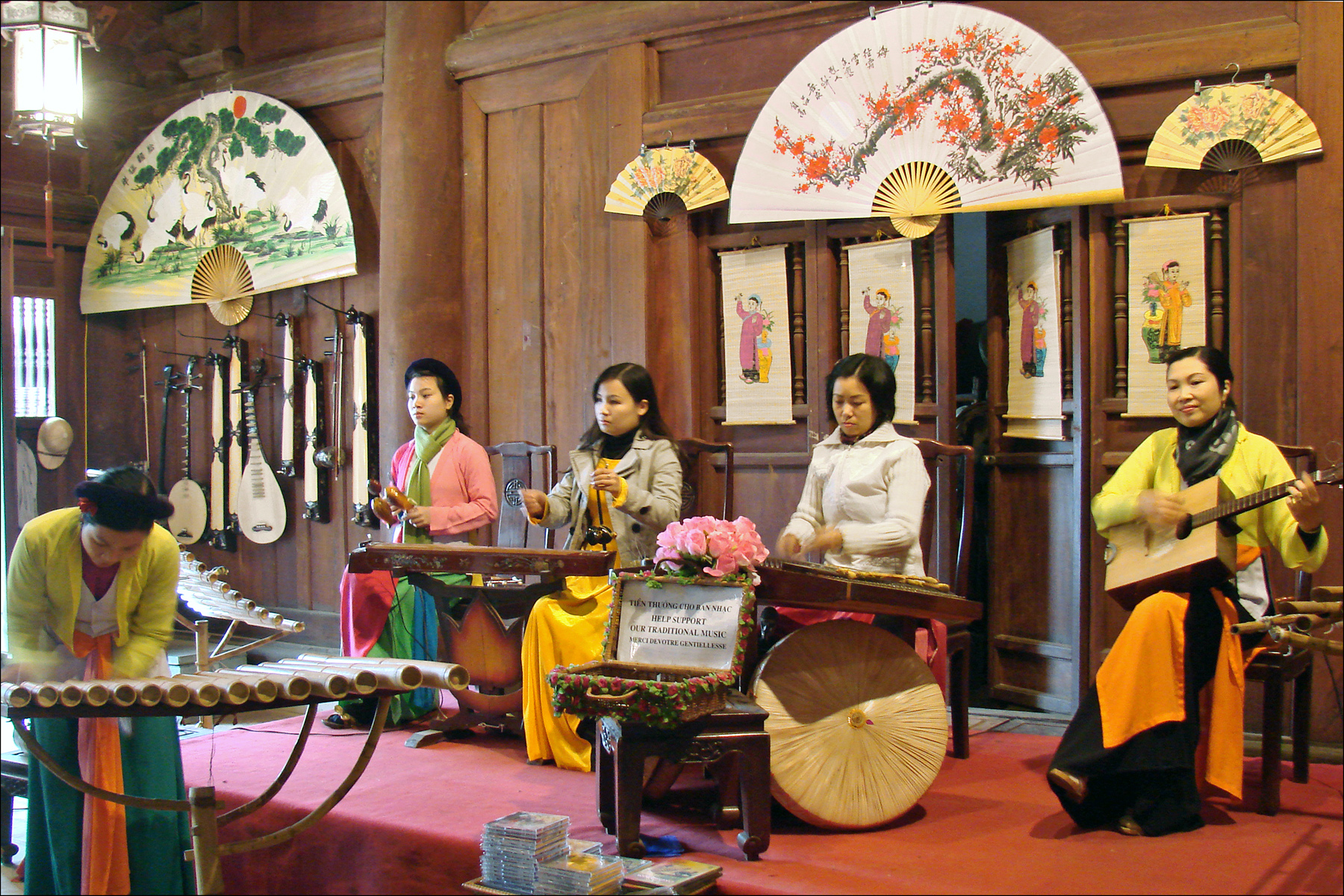
The woman on the far right is playing a modern đàn tứ
