= Tumdak' =

Type of drum

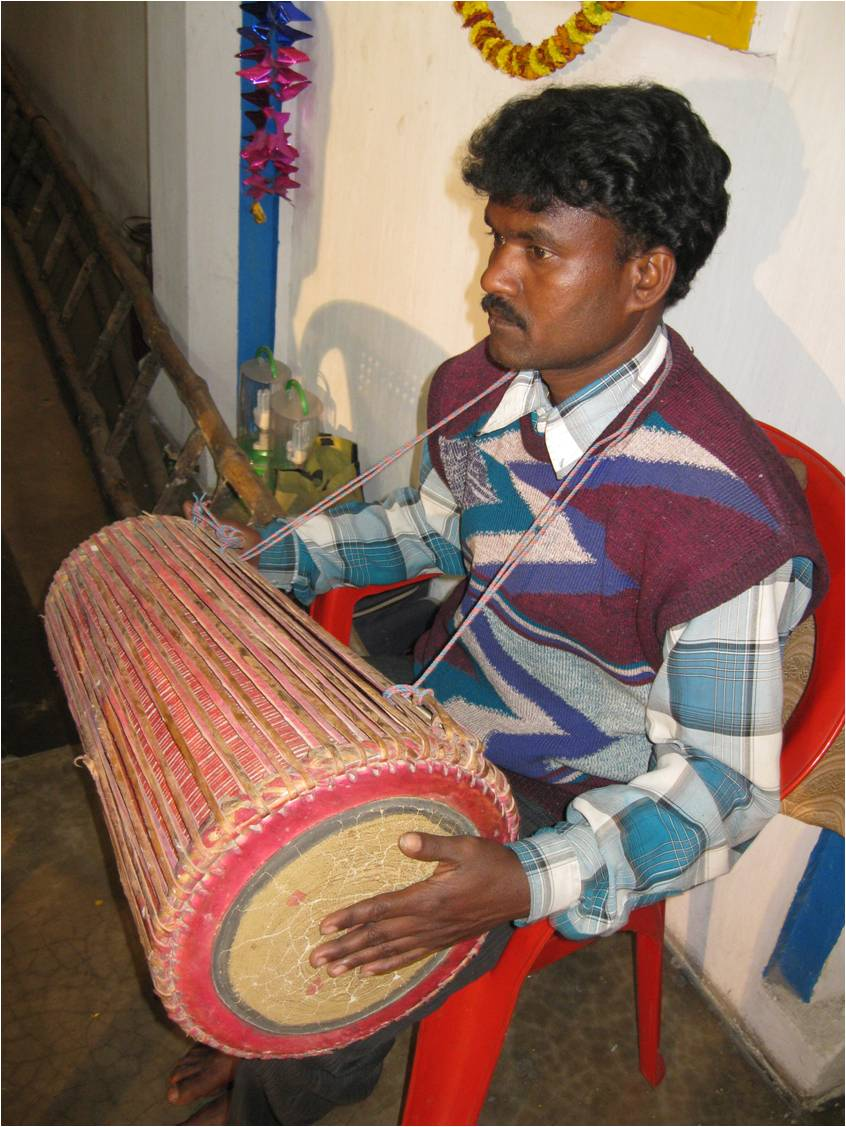
A Santal drummer playing a tumdak'

The tumdak (sometimes called the tumdah) is a hand-struck, double-headed membranophone used among the Santal people, who are generally located in Eastern India and Bangladesh. The Santal typically use the tumdak in combination with the tamak for religious ceremonies and festivals. Both drums are almost universally played by men rather than women. The body of the drum is cylindrical and made from clay. The two heads of the drum are usually cowhide, the right one being slightly smaller than the left. Like many similar Indian drums, each head has a round patch of tuning paste in the center which enhances the sound. When played for dancing, the tumdak player suspends the drum around his neck with a cord or leather strap. The tumdak falls within the larger category of double-headed, hand-struck Indian drums, which have various names: dholak, nal, mridangam. The player strikes the tumdak with full hand and fingers as required by the musical pattern. The rhythm of the tamak and tumdak set the basic metric/rhythmic pattern for Santal dances and are essential for traditional Santal music.

== See also ==
- Santal
- Santal music
- Music of India
