= Kemanak =

Indonesian musical instrument used in Gamelan

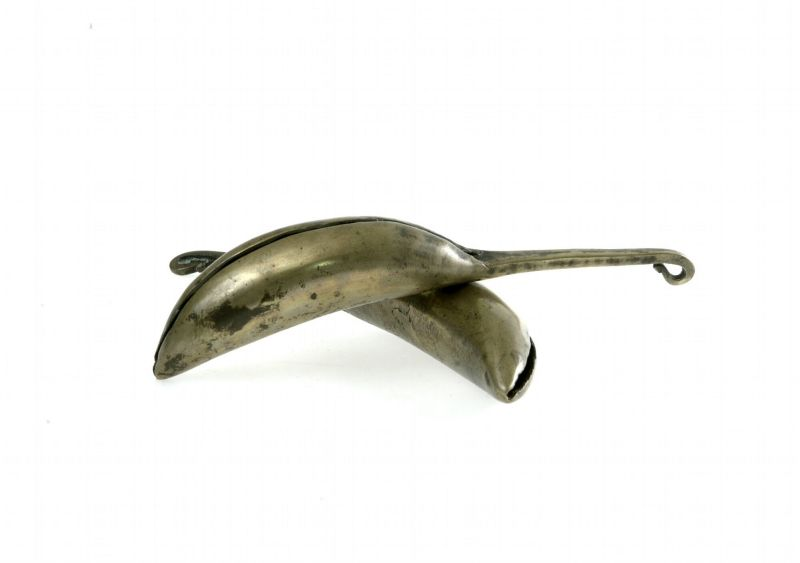

Kemanak (Javanese: ꦏꦼꦩꦤꦏ꧀, romanized: Kemanak) is a banana-shaped idiophone made of bronze, used in Javanese gamelan music. It is actually a metal slit drum. It is struck with a padded stick and then allowed to resonate. It has a specific pitch, which can be varied by covering the slit, but it is not matched to the other instruments of the gamelan. Kemanak are usually played in pairs, although they can be played in sets of four as well. They are used to accompany the bedhaya and serimpi, female court dances.

Kemanak is also the name of a style of gendhing which includes, in addition to kemanak, only colotomic instruments, a kendang, and a sindhen.

In the region of Cirebon on the Northwest Coast of Java, Kemanak are played in pairs by striking one against the other in a repetitive fashion. Unlike in Central Java, Kemanak in Cirebon are not reserved for specific performance idioms and are considered indispensable in the standard Gamelan repertoire.
