= Tulum-zurna =

Traditional musical instrument

The tulum-zurna (Turkish: wineskin zurna [oboe]) is a Turkish and Azerbaijani bagpipe. The instrument is found on the eastern Black Sea coast of Turkey, particularly around Artvin.

== See also ==
- Tulum, the common form of Turkish bagpipe
