= Gordang sambilan =

Indonesian traditional drum musical instruments

Gordang Sambilan
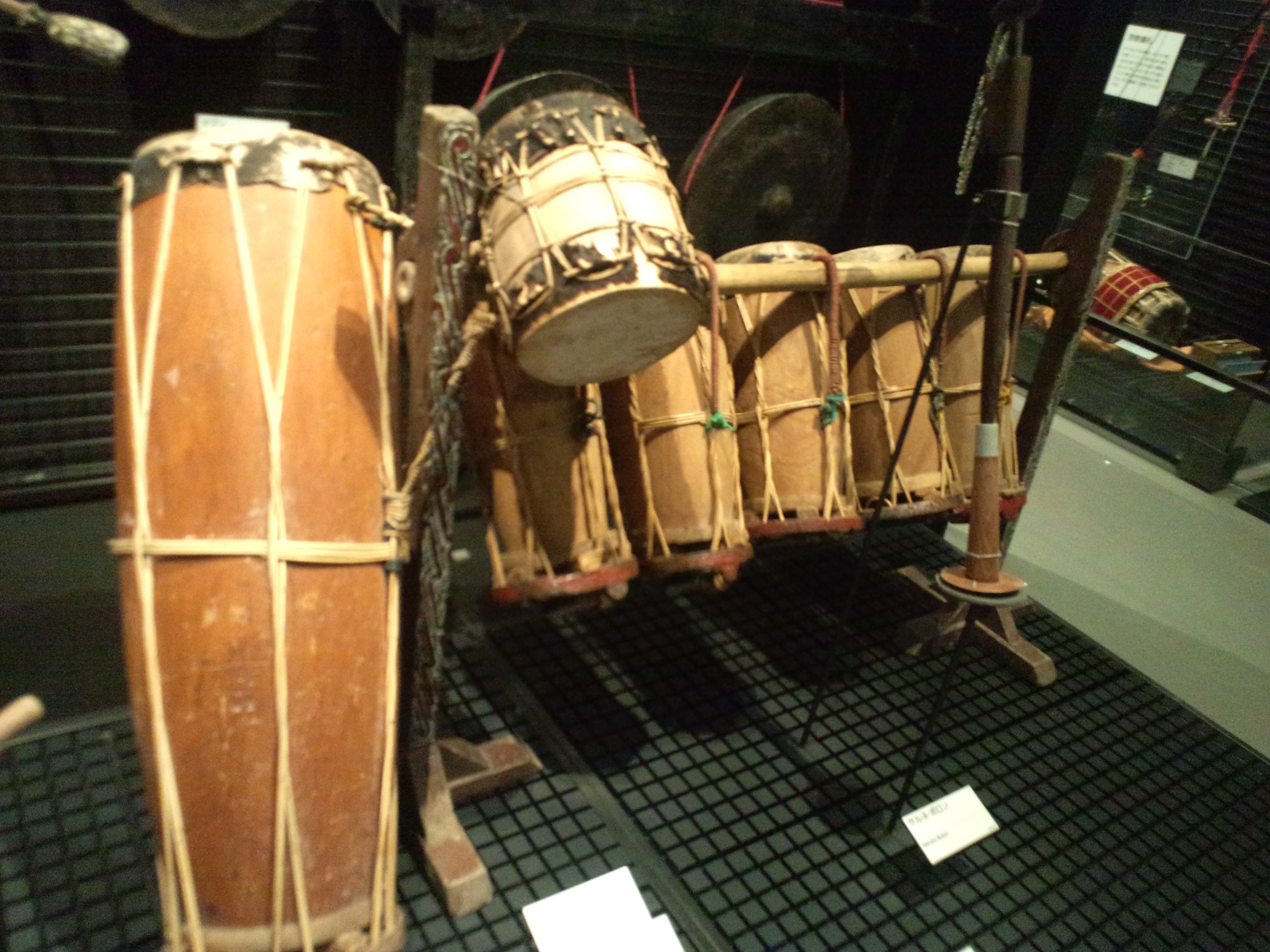
- Classification: Membranophone
- Inventor(s): Mandailing
- Developed: Indonesia

Gordang sambilan is a kendang (Indonesian version of drum) musical instrument originating from North Sumatra, Indonesia. Gordang sambilan consists of nine relatively large and long drums (drum chime) made of ingul wood and played by four people. The size and length of the nine drums are stratified, starting from the largest to the smallest.

For Mandailing people, especially in the past, gordang sambilan was a very important sacred traditional music. Gordang sambilan is seen as sacred because it is believed to have supernatural powers to summon ancestral spirits to provide help through a medium or shaman called Sibaso.

== Instrument ==
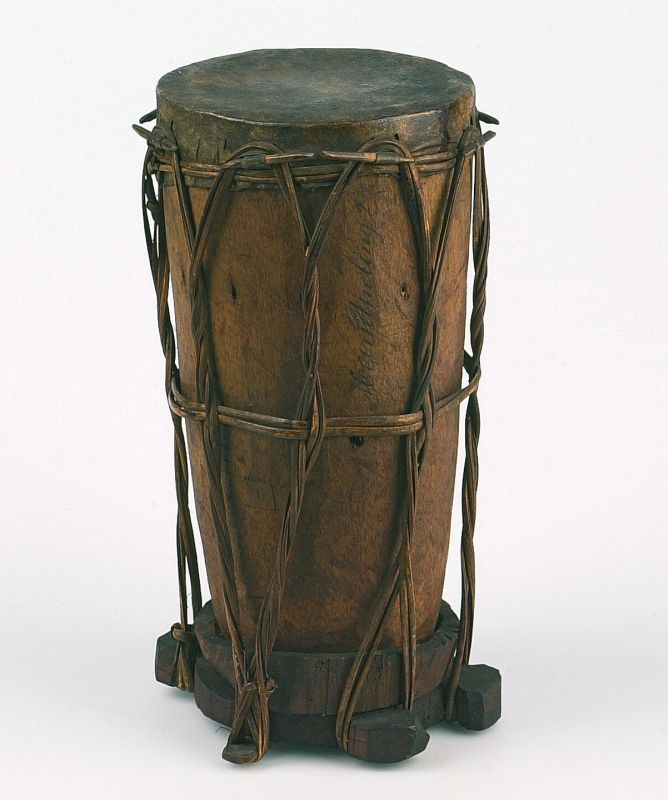
One of Gordang Sambilan Instruments, Tropenmuseum Collection, Before 1865

Gordang Sambilan consists of nine drums that are relatively large and long. The nine drums have successive sizes from the largest to the smallest size. The Gordang Sambilan resonator tube is made of perforated wood and one end of the hole (the head) is covered with a membrane made of cowhide which is stretched with rattan as a fastener. As a beating tool, Gordang Sambilan is used from wood which is somewhat blunt. In Gordang Sambilan, each drum ensemble has its own name.

Gordang Sambilan is equipped with two large ogung (gong). The largest gong is ogung boru boru (female gong) and the smaller one is called ogung jantan (male gong), while one smaller gong is called doal and three smaller gongs are named salempong or mong-mongan. Other equipment in Gordang Sambilan is a wind instrument made of bamboo called a sarune or saleot and a pair of small cymbals called a tali sasayat. The terms used by the people of Gunung Tua – Muarasoro, the names of the drums in order from the smallest to the largest are as follows: eneng-eneng, dang-kudang, paniga and jangat. Gordang sambilan is equipped with two ogung, one prayer, and three salempong or mongmongan.

== Performance ==
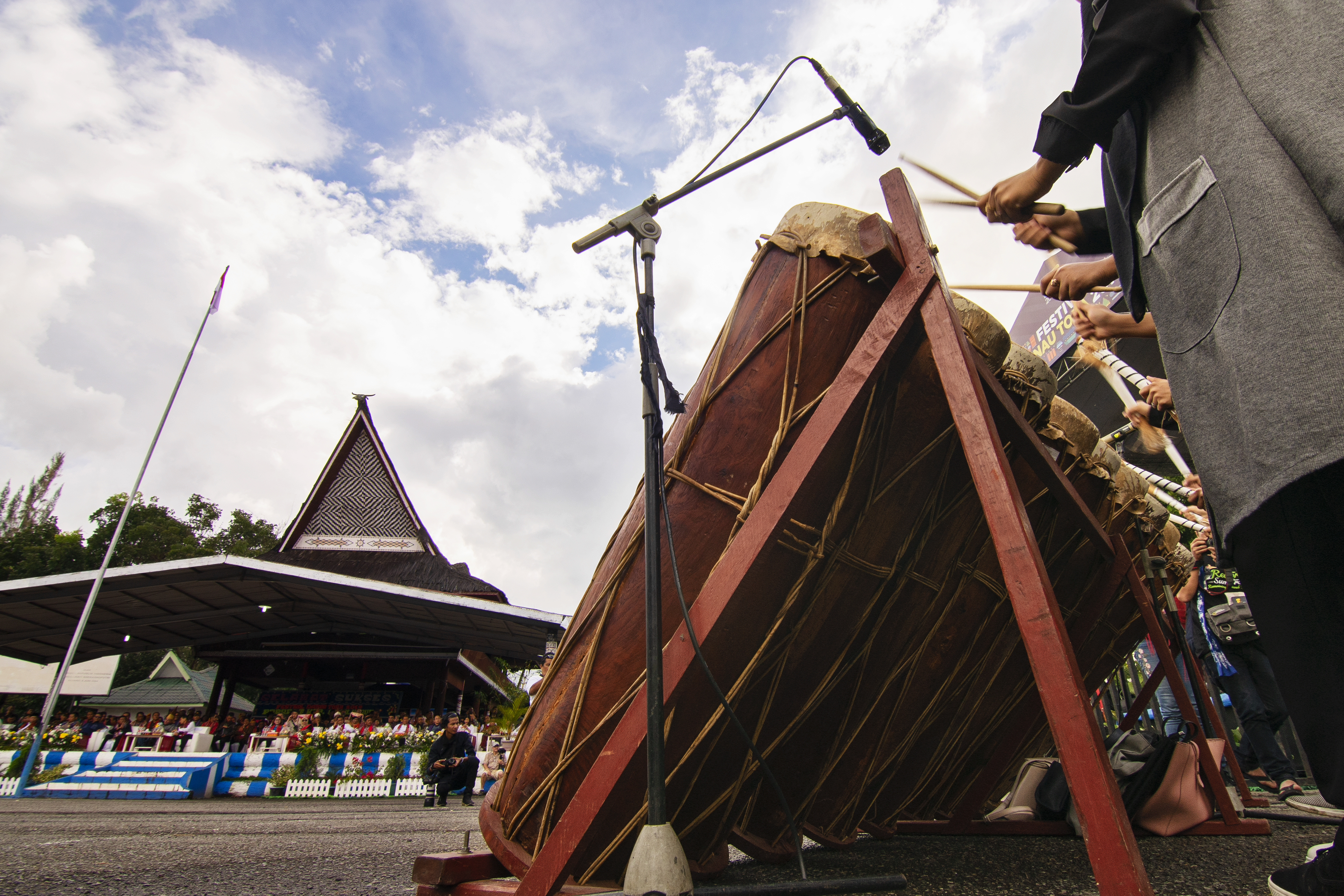
Gordang sambilan performance in North Sumatra

Gordang sambilan is used for ceremonies to summon ancestral spirits if help is needed. The ceremony is called paturuan Sibaso (summoning the spirit to possess / possess Sibaso medium). The goal is to ask for help from ancestral spirits, to overcome difficulties that are currently befalling the community, such as infectious diseases. Gordang sambilan is also used for ceremonies asking for rain or to stop the rain that has fallen for too long and causes damage, meaning that agricultural activities and community life can be restored. Apart from that, it is also used for a wedding ceremony called Orja Godang Markaroan Boru and for a funeral ceremony called Orja Mambulungi.

Today, the gordang sambilan is still used by the Mandailing people as a sacred traditional musical instrument.

== See also ==
- Kendang
- Gendang beleq
- Music of Indonesia
