= Sarab-e Bayanchqolu =

Sarab-e Bayanchqolu سراب باينچقلو
- Village
- Location within Iran
- Coordinates: 35°32′19″N 47°14′03″E
- Country: Iran
- Province: Kurdistan
- County: Sanandaj
- Bakhsh: Central
- Rural District: Hoseynabad-e Jonubi

Population (2006)
  - Total: 142
- Time zone: UTC+3:30 (IRST)
  - Summer (DST): UTC+4:30 (IRDT)

Sarab-e Bayanchqolu (Persian: سراب باينچقلو, also Romanized as Sarāb-e Bāyenchoqlū and Sarāb-e Bāyenchqolū; also known as Sarāb-e Bāyenjeqlū and Sārūp) is a village in Hoseynabad-e Jonubi Rural District, in the Central District of Sanandaj County, Kurdistan Province, Iran. At the 2006 census, its population was 142, in 34 families. The village is populated by Kurds.
