= Holboo =

Holboo (Mongolian: ᠬᠣᠯᠪᠤᠭ᠌᠎ᠠ᠋, холбоо, literally: "connection", Chinese: 好来宝, pinyin: hǎoláibǎo or Chinese: 好力宝, pinyin: hǎolìbǎo) is a Mongolian vocal art form that originated around the 12th century A.D. At first, it spread to the Horqin and Harqin areas, and then extended to other Mongolian settlements in Inner Mongolia Autonomous Region and its surrounding provinces. The singing forms of Holboo include singing, duet singing, duet singing and multi-person chorus. Holboo is sung in an impromptu manner, and the lyrics are similar to folk songs. On June 7, 2008, Holboo was listed in the second batch of the List of national intangible cultural heritage of China.
