= Pararayki =

The pararayki is a long-necked lute played by the Ainu people of the Kuril Islands. It generally has three strings, and is based upon the Russian balalaika.

== See also ==
- Ainu music
