= Magtel =

- Type: Private
- Industry: Telecommunications, energy, engineering, infrastructure, rail transport
- Founded: 1990 in Posadas, Spain
- Founders: López Magdaleno brothers
- Headquarters: Córdoba, Spain
- Area served: Spain
- Revenue: €140 million (2024)
- Number of employees: 800+ (2024)
- Website: www.magtel.es

Magtel is a Spanish technology and engineering company founded in 1990 in Posadas, in the province of Córdoba, by the López Magdaleno brothers. The company operates in telecommunications, renewable energy, engineering, civil infrastructure, railways, mining and defense, covering projects from design and construction through operation and maintenance. In 2024 it reported revenue of €140 million and employed more than 800 people directly.

== History ==
Magtel started out as a telecommunications contractor, building fiber-optic and other networks for public and private operators. Their telecom division then became a major supplier to the Spanish rail sector. From the 2000s it diversified into renewable energy, developing photovoltaic and solar thermal plants.

In 2012, the company's charitable arm, Fundación Magtel, was established. It runs social inclusion and employment training programs.

In 2015, Magtel was among the parties investigated over the public tender for the Aznalcóllar mine. In 2025, the Provincial Court of Seville acquitted all 16 defendants.

In 2018, Magtel entered mining by acquiring Nueva Tharsis, which holds historic deposits in the Iberian Pyrite Belt in Huelva. Through its subsidiary Eco Rail, it is part of a consortium with Marcotran and CMA CGM developing a rail freight motorway between the Port of Algeciras and Zaragoza, and it has formed a rail operator to compete in Spain's liberalized high-speed passenger market.

In 2023 a solar installation for Renfe became the first to feed power directly into a Spanish AVE high-speed line. As of 2023, they were also developing more than 4,000 MW of pumped-storage hydroelectricity projects across Spain, including one at the former mine lake of As Pontes in Galicia.

The company has also expanded into the defense sector.
