= Santal music =

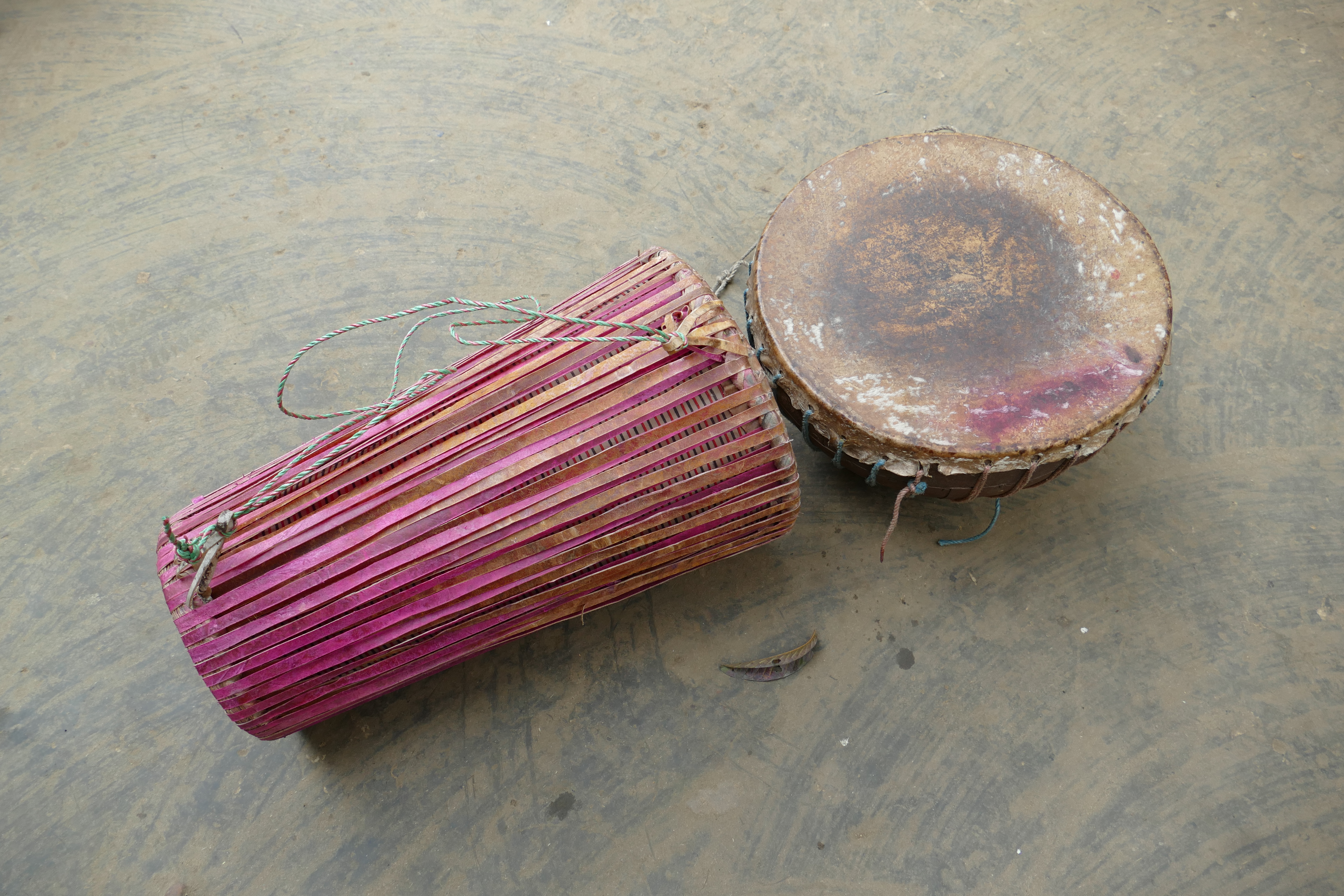
Tamak (r.) and Tumdak (l.) - typical drums of the Santhal people, photographed in a village in Dinajpur district, Bangladesh.

The Santal people love music and dance. Like other ethnic groups of the Indian subcontinent, their culture has been influenced by mainstream Indian culture and by Western culture, but traditional music and dance still remain. Santal music differs from Hindustani classical music in significant ways. Onkar Prasad has done the most recent work on the music of the Santal but others preceded his work, notably W. G. Archer who collected and analyzed hundreds of Santal songs in the mid-twentieth century. The Santal traditionally accompany many of their dances with two drums: the Tamak' and the Tumdak'. The flute was considered the most important Santal traditional instrument and still evokes feelings of nostalgia for many Santal.

== Instruments ==
Musical instruments used by the Santhal tribes are Sarpa, Buan flute, Sarenga, Banam. Tumdak, Tamak and lerda are percussion instruments. Mostly instruments are played by men except for the sarpa and the cymbals (jhal). However females do sing in a group.

Traditionally the Santal used a variety of musical instruments, but the following are now the most prominent ones in use.

Membranophones

The Santal have two primary membranophones: the Tamak' and the Tumdak'. These instruments are critical for most traditional Santal music because they provide the metric foundation for the music. The Tumdak' is a hand-struck two-headed drum. The body of the drums made from clay. Like most similar Indian drums, the left head is larger than the right. Leather straps zigzag from head to head to connect and keep them tight. The drum is usually suspended around the drummers neck by a leather strap. The Tamak' is a single-headed kettle drum. It is struck by the player with two sticks. The size of the head is usually 14-16 inches in diameter. The Tamak' is thought to have special spiritual meaning and power.

Idiophones

Idiophones include the ankle bells of dancers are called Junko and like other such Indian instruments they sound as the dancers dance. The Santal frequently use a small pair of cymbals with their music as well. Metal rattles of various sorts are also found in many Santal musical contexts.

Aerophones

Aerophones are well represented. The flute or Tiriwaw held a special place of importance. The Tirio is made from bamboo and has seven holes. The Santal flute, like the widespread Bansuri, has open holes which permit the player to bend the pitch. The Santal flute is associated with love. Many Santal musicians also play the Harmonium. Introduced by the British, the harmonium is a small pump organ with a three-octave keyboard and hand bellows at the back. Although it was originally introduced by outsiders, Indian musicians have adapted it to Indian musical styles and it is now as ubiquitous in India as the guitar is in the West.

Chordophones The Dhodro banam is a one-stringed bowed lute. The Dhodro banam often has anthropomorphic carved heads. The Phet banam is also a bowed lute but has three or four strings. Both are similar to the more widely known Indian Sarangi. Christian Santal musicians sometimes use a unique instrument called the kabkubi. This one-stringed plucked chordophone was developed by Christian Santal as a substitute for the Tamak'. Because the Tamak' had such strong associations with traditional religious ceremonies and was thought to invoke the presences of certain spirits, early missionaries and Christian converts began to use the kabkubi in its place.

== Tunes ==
Traditional Santal tunes can still be heard in many Santal villages, especially during Santal festivals. Most songs and tunes have direct associations with particular festivals. Tunes used for the Sohrae harvest festival, for example, are referred to by that name. Moreover, most tunes are related to the festival dances they accompany. As a consequence, the meters and rhythms of the tunes reflect those particular festival dances. Santal melodies usually stay within an octave and often utilize scales of five or six pitches. The cadence of many Santal tunes include a unique version of hemiola—a metric feature in which divisions of 2 and 3 are placed in contrast to each other.

== Bibliography ==
- Archer, W. G. The Hill of Flutes: Life, Love, and Poetry in Tribal India: A Portrait of the Santals. Pittsburgh: University of Pittsburgh Press, 1974.
- Bodding, P. O. Santal Folk Tales. Cambridge, Mass.: H. Aschehough; Harvard University Press, 1925.
- ———. Santal Riddles and Witchcraft among the Santals. Oslo: A. W. Brøggers, 1940.
- Bompas, Cecil Henry, and P. O. Bodding. Folklore of the Santal Parganas. London: D. Nutt, 1909.
- Culshaw, W. J. Tribal Heritage; a Study of the Santals. London: Lutterworth Press, 1949.
- Prasad, Onkar. Santal Music: A Study in Pattern and Process of Cultural Persistence, Tribal Studies of India Series; T 115. New Delhi: Inter-India Publications, 1985.
- Roy Chaudhury, Indu. Folk Tales of the Santals. 1st ed. Folk Tales of India Series, 13. New Delhi: Sterling Publishers, 1973.

== See also ==
- Santal
