= Cekuntrung =

Indonesian musical instrument

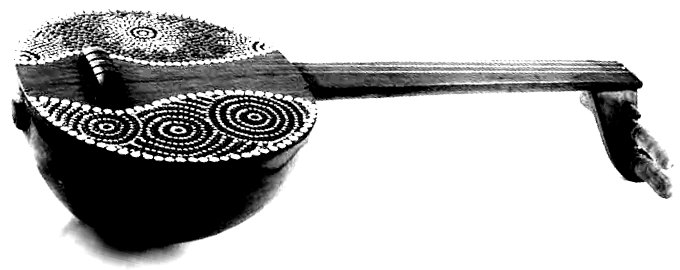
- A Cekuntrung from private collection.

String instrument
- Classification: String instrument
- Hornbostel–Sachs classification: (Composite chordophone)
- Developed: Indonesia

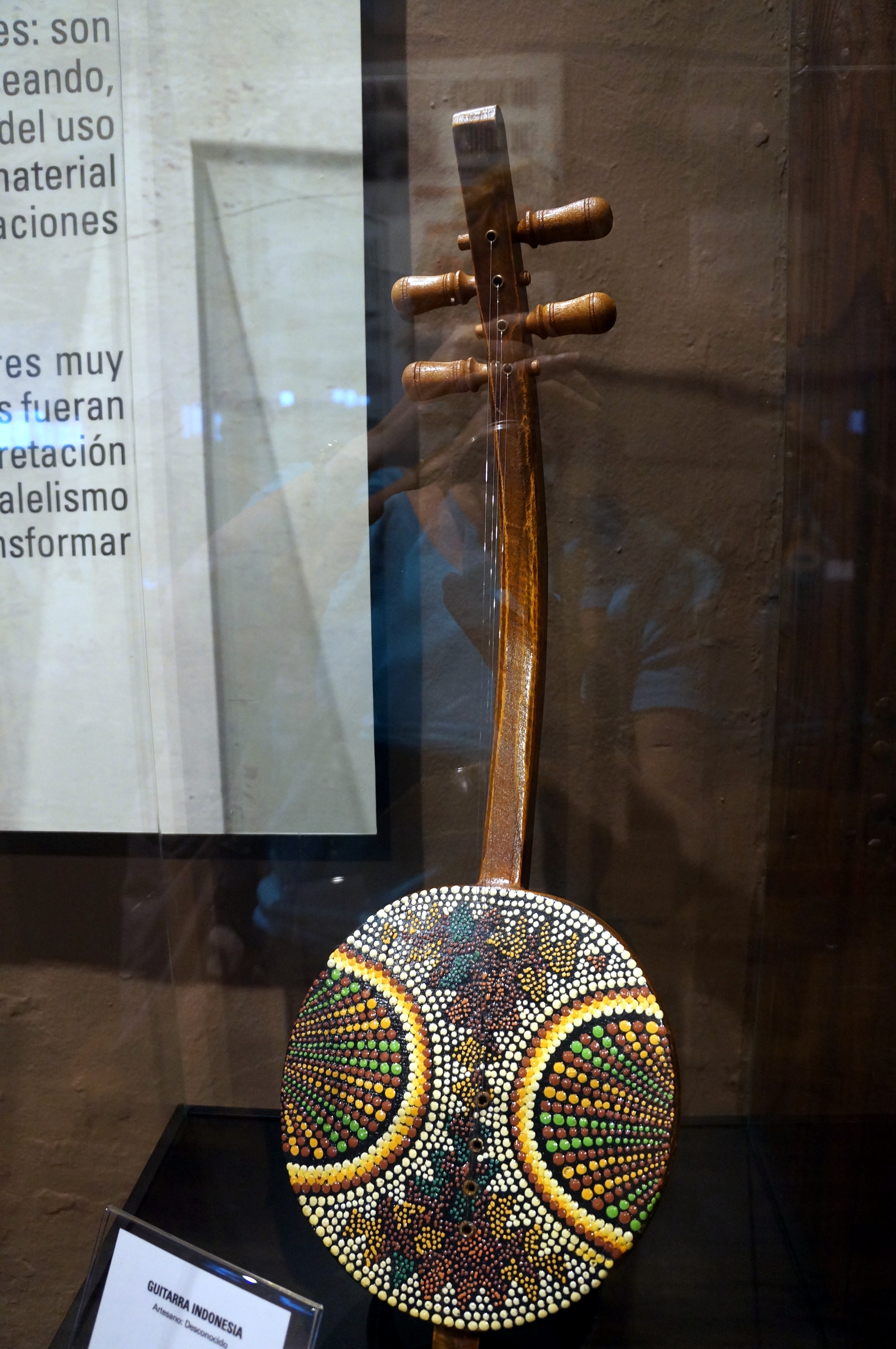
Indonesian Cekuntrung at the Casa Museo Del Timple, Lanzarote, Spain.

The cekuntrung is a stringed musical instrument from Indonesia.

It has 4 or 2 strings in single courses. The strings are often made of metal, but sometimes of nylon or fishing line. It can be in the form of a lute/oud or a harp.
