= Agung =

Indonesian-Philippine traditional musical instrument

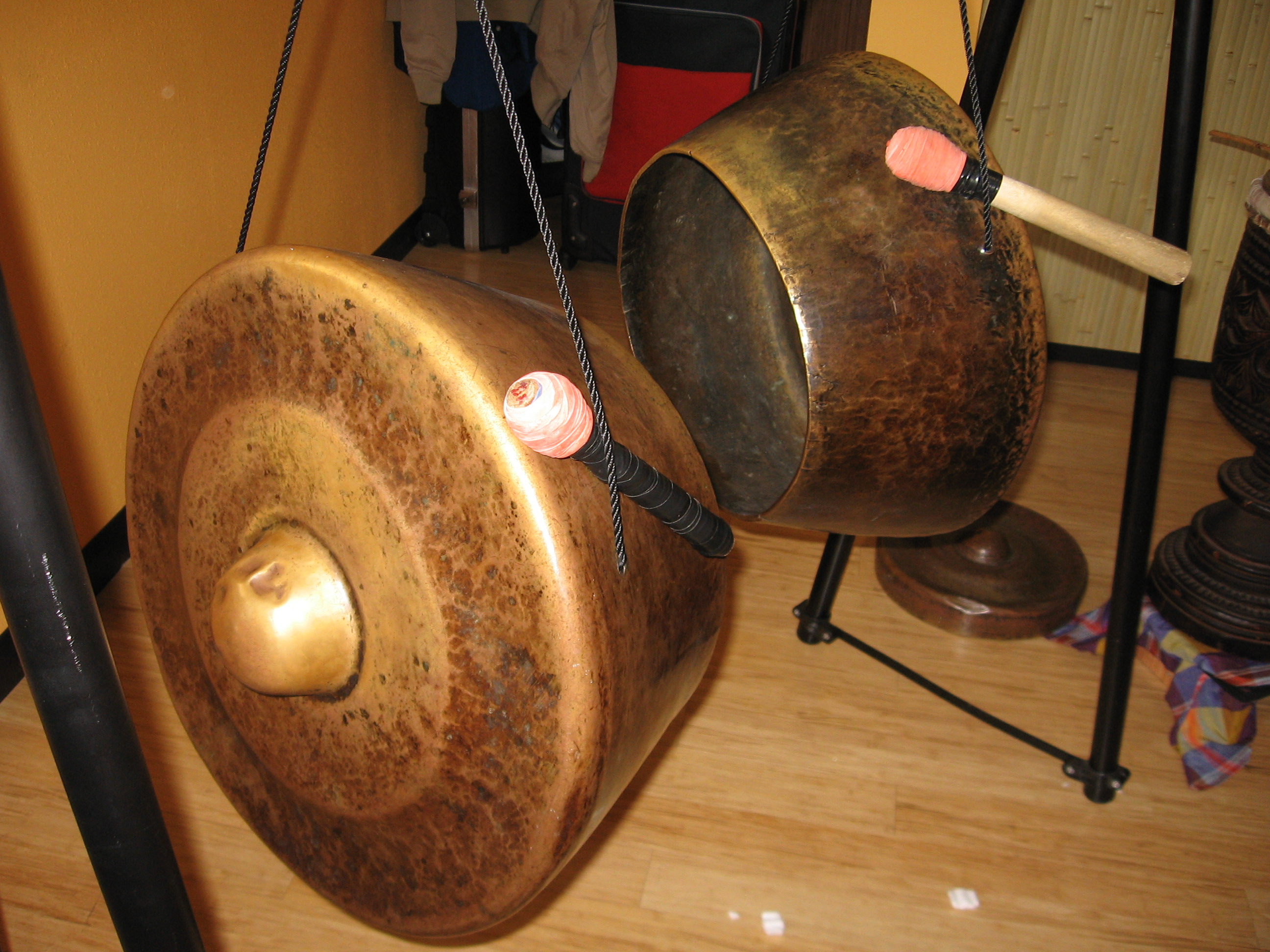

Percussion instrument
- Classification: Idiophone
- Hornbostel–Sachs classification: 111.241.2 (Sets of gongs)
- Developed: Indonesia

The agung, also transliterated as agong, is a set of two wide-rimmed, vertically suspended gongs used by the Maguindanao, Maranao, Sama-Bajau and Tausug people of the Philippines as a supportive instrument in kulintang ensembles. The agung is also ubiquitous among other groups found in Palawan, Panay, Mindoro, Mindanao, Sabah, Sulawesi, Sarawak and Kalimantan as an integral part of the agung orchestra.

== Description ==
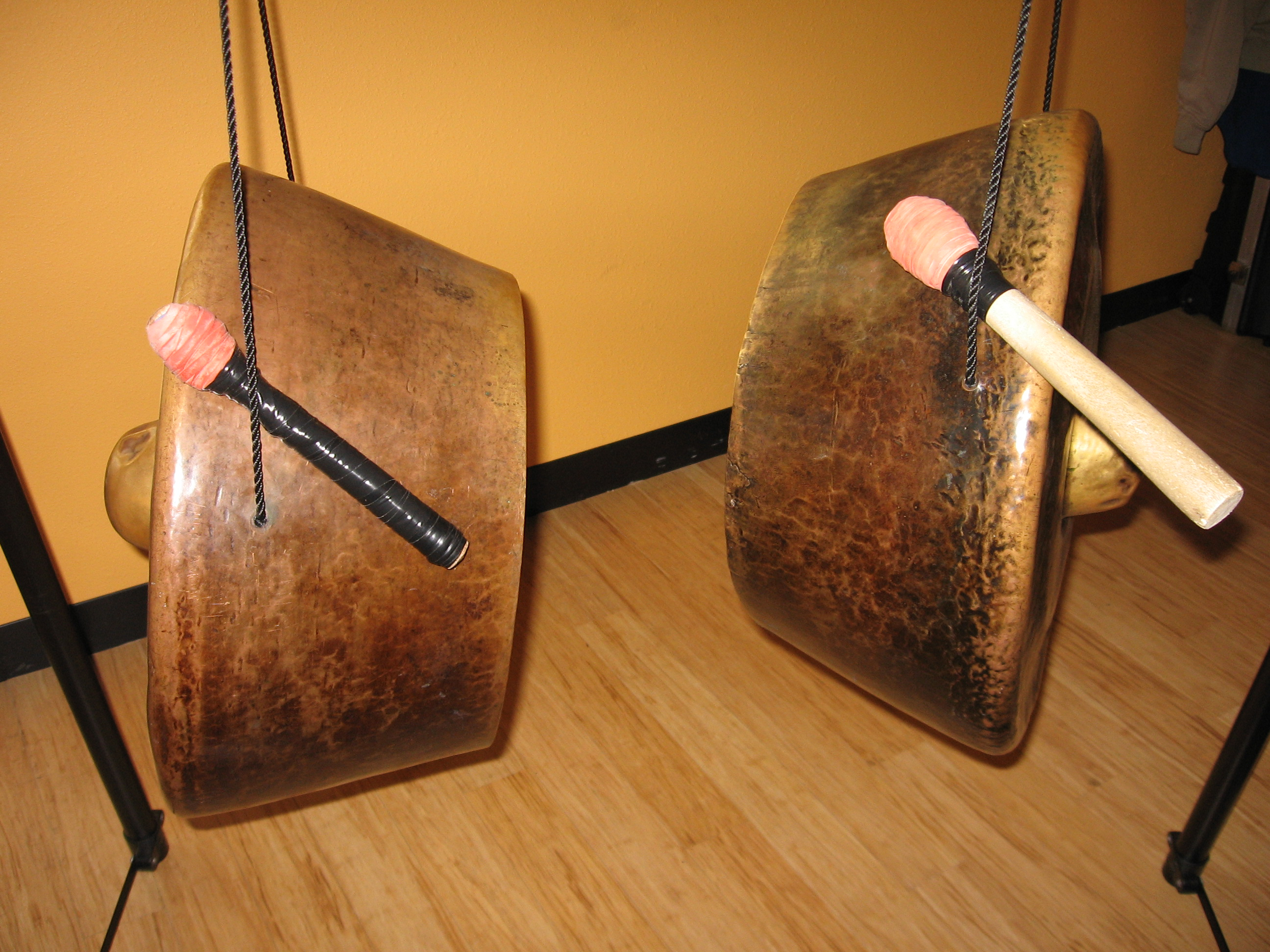
The agung. The left gong is the pangandungan, used for basic beats. The right gong is the panentekan, which complements the pangandungan.

The agung is a large, heavy, wide-rimmed gong shaped like a kettle gong. of the agung produces a bass sound in the kulintang orchestra and weighs between 13 and 16 pounds, but it is possible to find agungs weigh as low as 5 pounds or as high as 20 or 30 pounds each, depending on the metal (bronze, brass or iron) used to produce them.

Though their diameters are smaller than the gandingan's, at roughly 22 inches (560 mm) to 24 inches (610 mm) in length, they have a much deeper turned-in takilidan (rim) than the latter, with a width of 12 to 13 inches (330 mm) including the knob.

They are hung vertically above the floor at or a bit below the waist line, suspended by ropes fastened to structures like strong tree limb, beam of a house, ceiling, or gong stand.

The larger, lower pitched gong of the two is called the pangandungan by the Maguindanao and the p'nanggisa-an by the Maranao. Played on the musician's right, it provides the main part, which it predominantly played on the accents of the rhythmic structure.

The smaller, higher pitched gong, the thicker of the two, is called the panentekan by the Maguindanao and the p'malsan or pumalsan by the Maranao. Found on the player's left, it is mainly played on the weaker double and triple beats of the rhythmic structure, in counterpoint to the pangandungan's part.

== Origins ==
Scholars seem to agree that the origins of the agung are in Indonesia, noting that the word agung/agong is derived from the Malay agong and Indonesian/Javanese ageng.

Further evidence of this comes from a British explorer, Thomas Forrest, who in the 1770s wrote Filipinos were "fond of musical gongs which came from Cheribon on Java and have round knobs on them".

== Technique ==
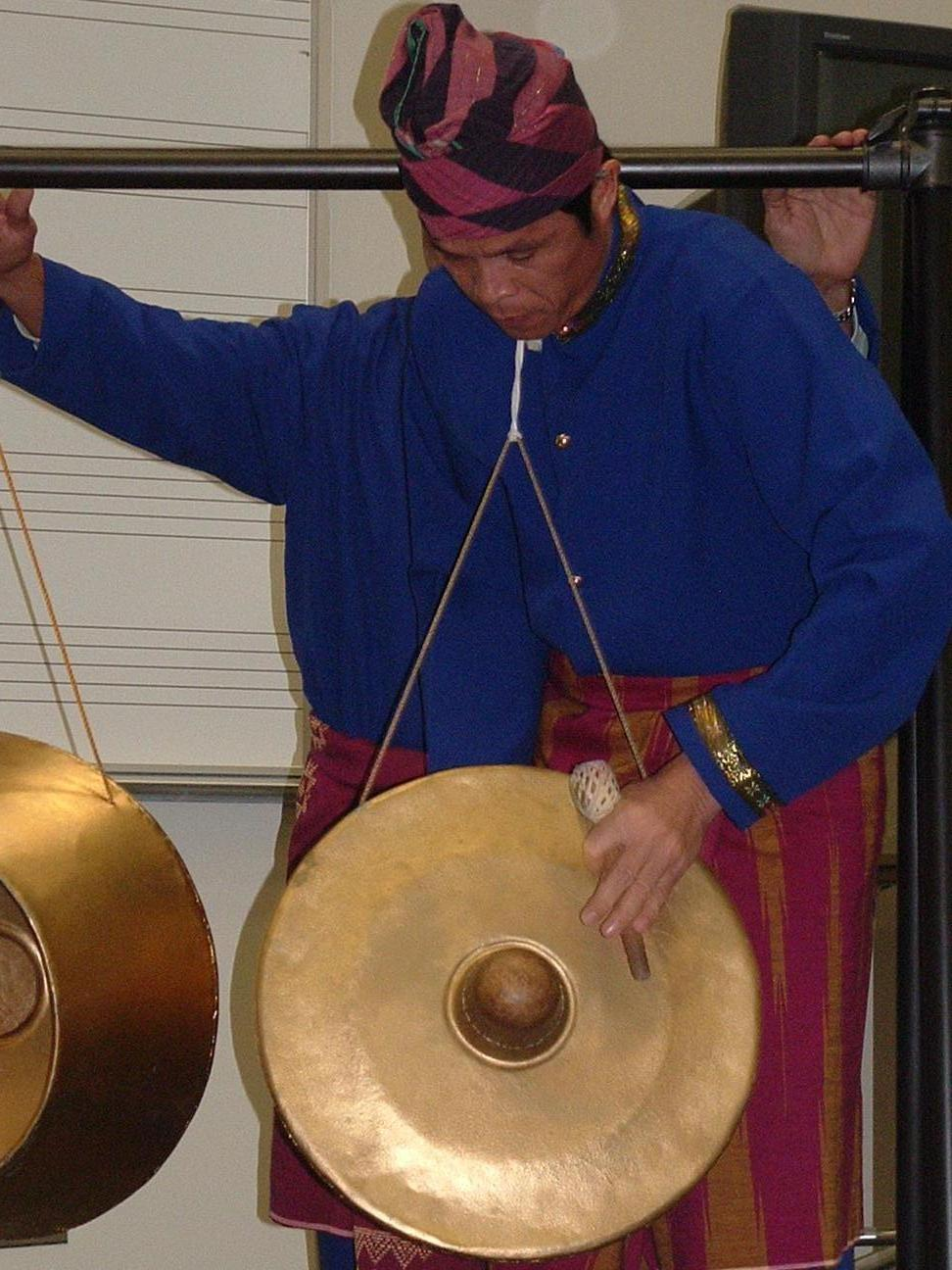
An agung player demonstrating the new technique of katinengka with his beater.

The agung is usually performed while standing beside the instrument, holding the upper edge of its flange between the thumb and other fingers with the left hand while striking the knob with the right hand. The mallets, called balu, are made from short sticks about half a foot in length and padded with soft but tough material such as rubber at one end. Using these balus, players handle the agung similar to the way a brass tom-tom is played.

A series of solid, fast decaying sounds are produced using dampening techniques. The desired effect is produced after striking the knob, by leaving one's hand or knee or the mallets themselves on it. When one player is using two gongs, the assistant holding the lower-pitched gong positions it at an angle and dampens its surface using their hands.

Recently, new ways of handling the agung have emerged, including grasping a portion of the boss rather than the flange to dampen or using regular strokes upon the busel while striking the surrounding gong surface with the opposite, wooden end of the beater. The latter technique, called katinengka, is used by downriver musicians to produce metallic sounds during kulintang performances.

Different combinations of players, gongs and mallets can be used for playing the agung: two players with each assigned their own gong or just one. When playing alone, the agung player could either play both gongs with the player holding the higher-pitched gongs face-to-face, with the lower one held at an angle by an assistant for stability, or just one gong. The latter style, common among downriver Maguindanaos in Simuay, who consider this style an old one, uses only the higher-pitch gong for it, unlike the lower-pitched gong, is considered the lead gong, therefore having primary importance. An example of this is when single gong agungs are used during a tagunggo piece.

The number of mallets used by the player could also vary as well. For most occasions, only one mallet is used but for other techniques, the player could use two mallets, one in each hand. An even more interesting technique uses only one balu but requires the player to play the agung in reverse order of pitches. Called patuy, this technique and the one with two mallets are normally reserved only for competition and exhibition instances.

== Uses ==
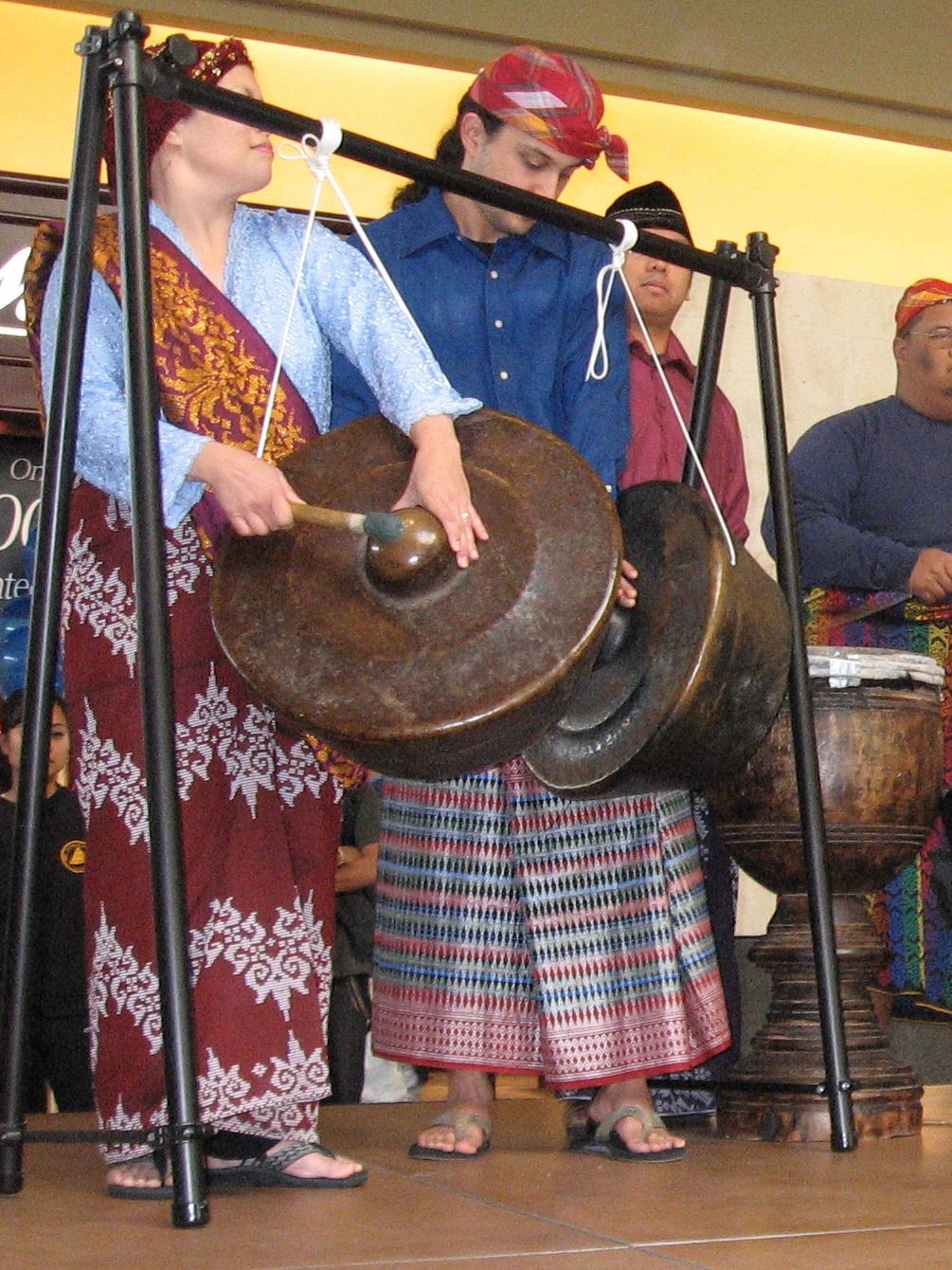
Playing the agung as part of the kulintang ensemble

=== Kulintang ensemble ===
The main use for the agung in Maguindanao and Maranao society is as a supportive/accompanying instrument of an orthodox kulintang ensemble. Using basic patterns and interlocking rhythms, a player would use the agung to complement the melody played by the kulintang. The patterns players use are normally considered freer than either the babendil or the dabakan; players could manipulate the patterns freely as long as they conform, reaffirm, reinforce and even generate the rhythmic mode of the piece. The length of the patterns themselves may vary depending on how they fit into the melodic improvisation. Rapid style is useful especially during exhibition of playing skills.

Among both the Maguindanao and the Maranao, the agung embodies all that is masculine and thus the agung is traditionally considered a masculine instrument. To be considered a good player, one must possess strength, stamina (playing extremely fast tempos with no mistakes) and endurance. Players must also exhibit improvisation skills for different patterns to be considered as having quality musicianship—lest the audience considers the patterns played repetitions and mundane.

Because of the highly skilled nature required for playing the agung, it is not uncommon to see agung players have friendly rivalries during a performance, using tricks in an attempt to throw others off-beat. For instance, if the p’nanggisa's elaborations are so elusive that the p’mals has a hard time ornamenting or if the reversed happens and the p’mals ornaments to the point the p’nanggisa's performance is engulfed, the player that cannot keep up is usually embarrassed, becoming the butt of jokes. Normally agung players switch off after each piece, but during instances like this where one player cannot handle the part being played, players either remain at their gongs or switch during the performance. It is also possible for agung players to switch places with the dabakan after two pieces. Even though the players compete, they still understand they are a single entity, closely accompanying the melody, employ different variations without destroying the music's basic patterns.

=== Interactions with the opposite sex ===
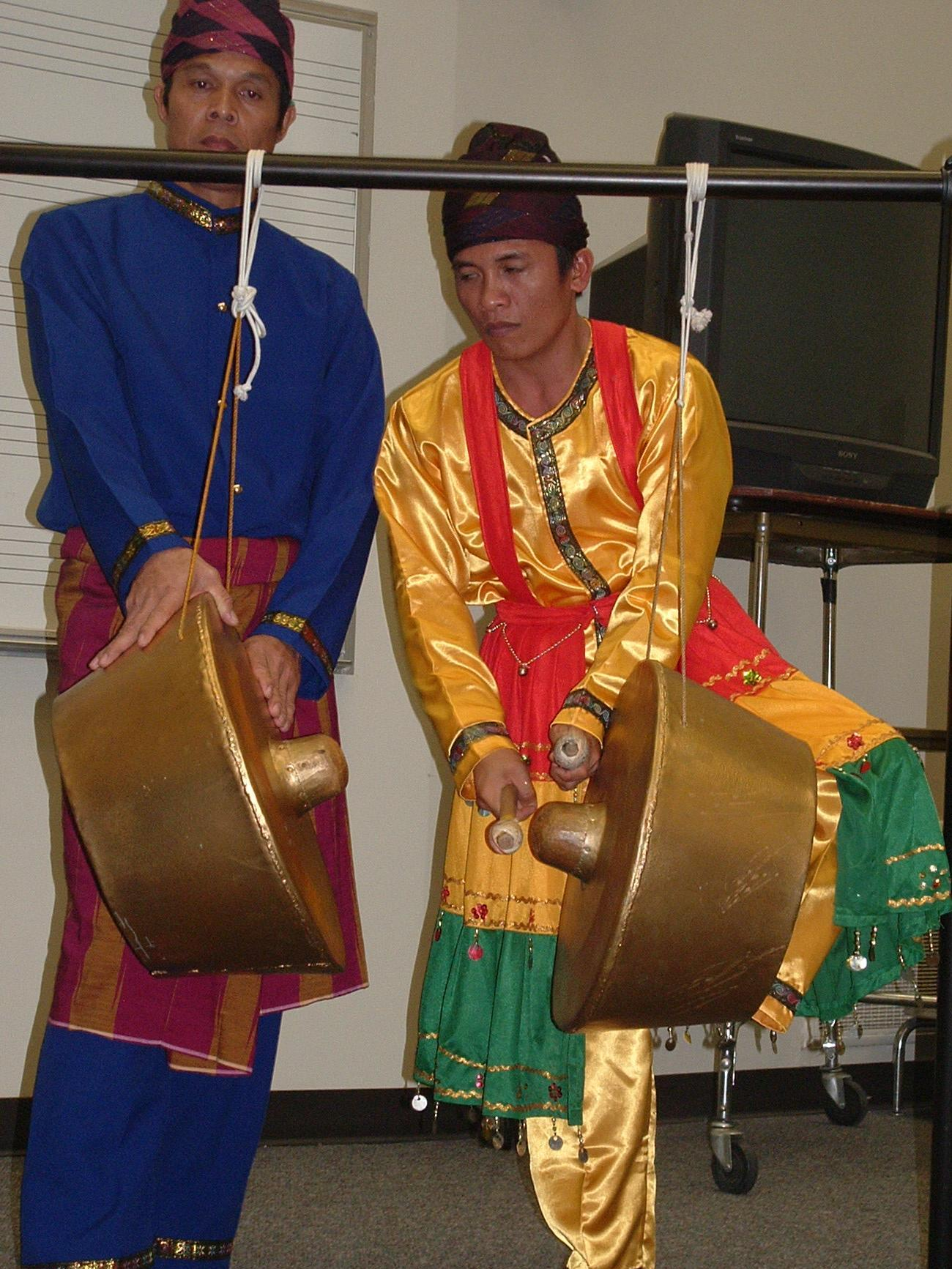
An agung played during a contest by a Magui Moro Master Artist using two balus.

There was also a secondary motive for men, especially young males, for learning the agung: the ability to interact with young, unmarried women. Both Maranao and Maguindanao cultures traditionally adhere to Islamic customs which prohibit dating or causal conversation between the opposite sexes (unless married to or related to by blood) and therefore performances such as kulintang music provided the opportunity for such a connection. Among the Maguindanao, the rhythmic modes of duyog and sinulog a kamamatuan allowed agung players to serenade the young, unmarried women on the kulintang. Tidto, the other rhythmic mode, could also be used but players rarely use this for serenading since the kulintang player is usually an older woman.

=== Contest ===
The latter mode actually is reserved specifically for solo agung contest. Unlike other Southern Filipino groups who participate in group contest, the Maguindanao are unique in that they also hold solo agung contest to find out who in the community is the best papagagung (expert agung player). Tidto is prefect for such contest since the agung is often the focus of attention, the focal point during the ensemble during this mode. Players normally perform two or more versions playing the three types of techniques discussed above.

=== Signaling and the supernatural ===
Other than its use in the kulintang ensemble, the agung also had other non-ensemble uses among the Maguindanao and Maranao. The agung has been used to warn others of impending danger, announcing the time of day and other important occasions. For instance, long ago the sultan would beat the agung repeatedly to announce the onset of a meeting or during the fasting month of Ramadhan, the agung would ring either at three in the morning to indicate the signal to eat (sawl) or at sunset, to mark the end for fasting that day. And supposedly due to the deep, loud sound the agung produces, people believed that it possessed supernatural powers. For instance, during an earthquake, the locals of Maguindanao would strike the agung in a fast, loud rhythm called baru-baru, believing its vibrations would either lessen or even halt the jolt of an earthquake.

== Similar agung instruments ==
=== Kulintang ensembles ===
In the Sulu Archipelago, the kulintang orchestra uses not two but three low-sounding agungs, which serve as accompaniment in Tausug, Samal and Yakan ensembles. For the Tausug and Samal, the largest of the agungs with a wide turned-in rim is called the tunggalan or tamak , which provides slow, regular beats, similar to the Maguindanaon pangandungan and Maranao p’nanggisa-an. The smaller pair of agungs, the duahan, syncopate with the tunggalan/tamak. These are further classified: the wider-rimmed duahan is called the pulakan and the narrower one is called the huhugan or buahan by the Tausug and bua by the Samal.

=== In agung ensembles ===
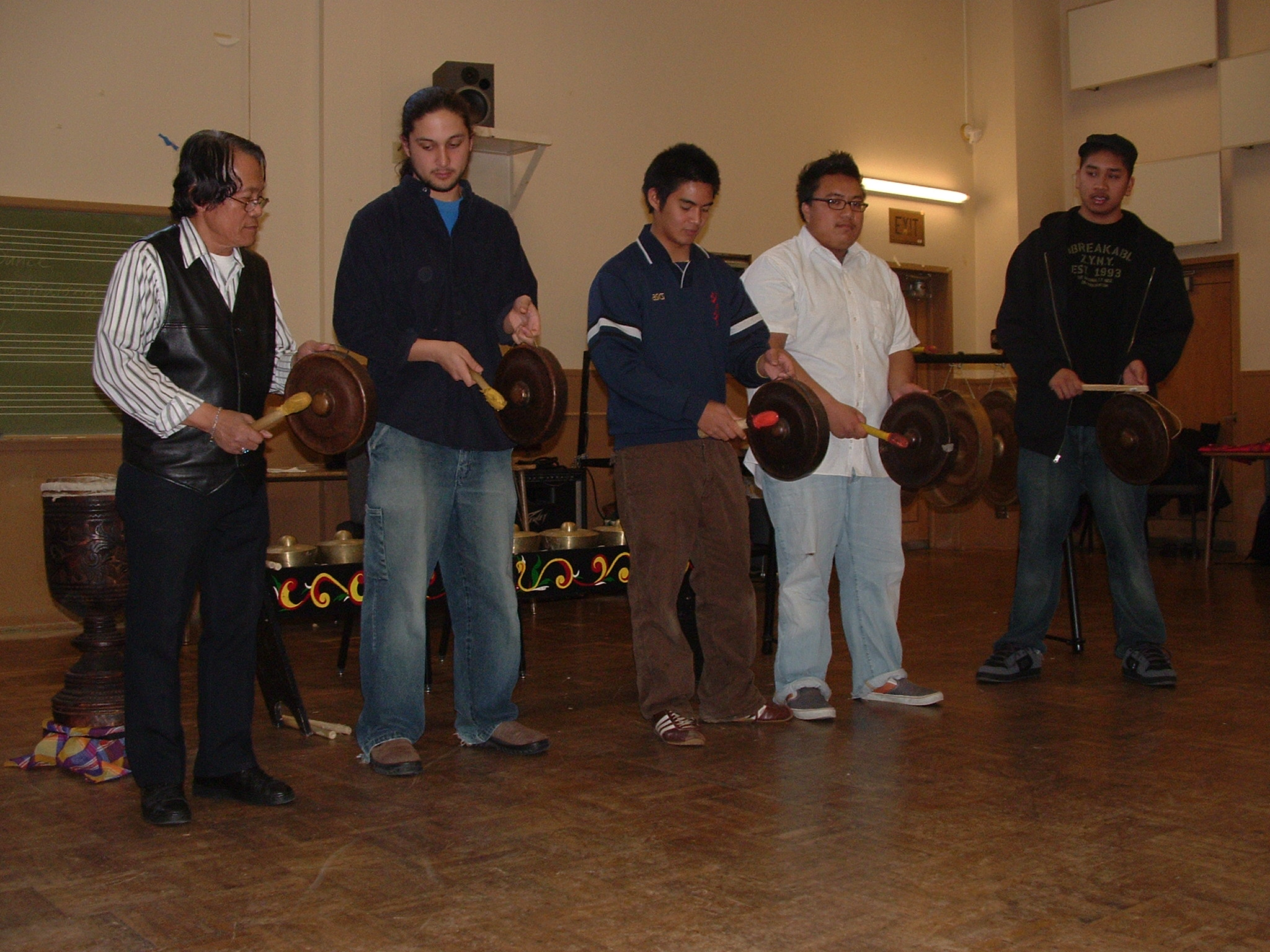
A Tiruray agung ensemble, called a karatung, demonstrated at San Francisco State University

Agungs also play a major role in agung orchestras—ensembles composed of large hanging, suspended or held, knobbed gongs which act as drones without any accompanying melodic instrument like a kulintang. Such orchestras are prevalent among Indigenous Philippine groups (Bagobo, Bilaan, Bukidon, Hanunoo, Magsaka, Manabo, Mangyan, Palawan, Subanun, Suludnon, T’boli, Tagakaolu, Tagbanwa and the Tiruray), regions in Kalimantan and Indonesia (Iban, Modang, Murut) and Sabah and Sarawak in Malaysia (Bidayuh, Dusun, Iban, Kadazan, Kajan, Kayan, and Murut), places where agung orchestras take precedence over kulintang-like orchestras. The composition and tuning of these orchestras vary widely from one group to another. For instance, the Hanunoo of Mindoro have a small agung ensemble consisting of only two light gongs played by two musicians on the floor in a simple duple rhythm while the Manobo have an ensemble (called an ahong) consisting of 10 small agungs hung vertically on a triangular frame. It includes three musicians: one standing up, playing the melody, and the rest sitting. The ahong is divided by purpose, with the higher-pitched gongs (kaantuhan) carrying the melody, three to four lower-pitched gongs (gandingan) playing melodic ostinato figures, and the lowest-pitched gong (bandil) setting the tempo.

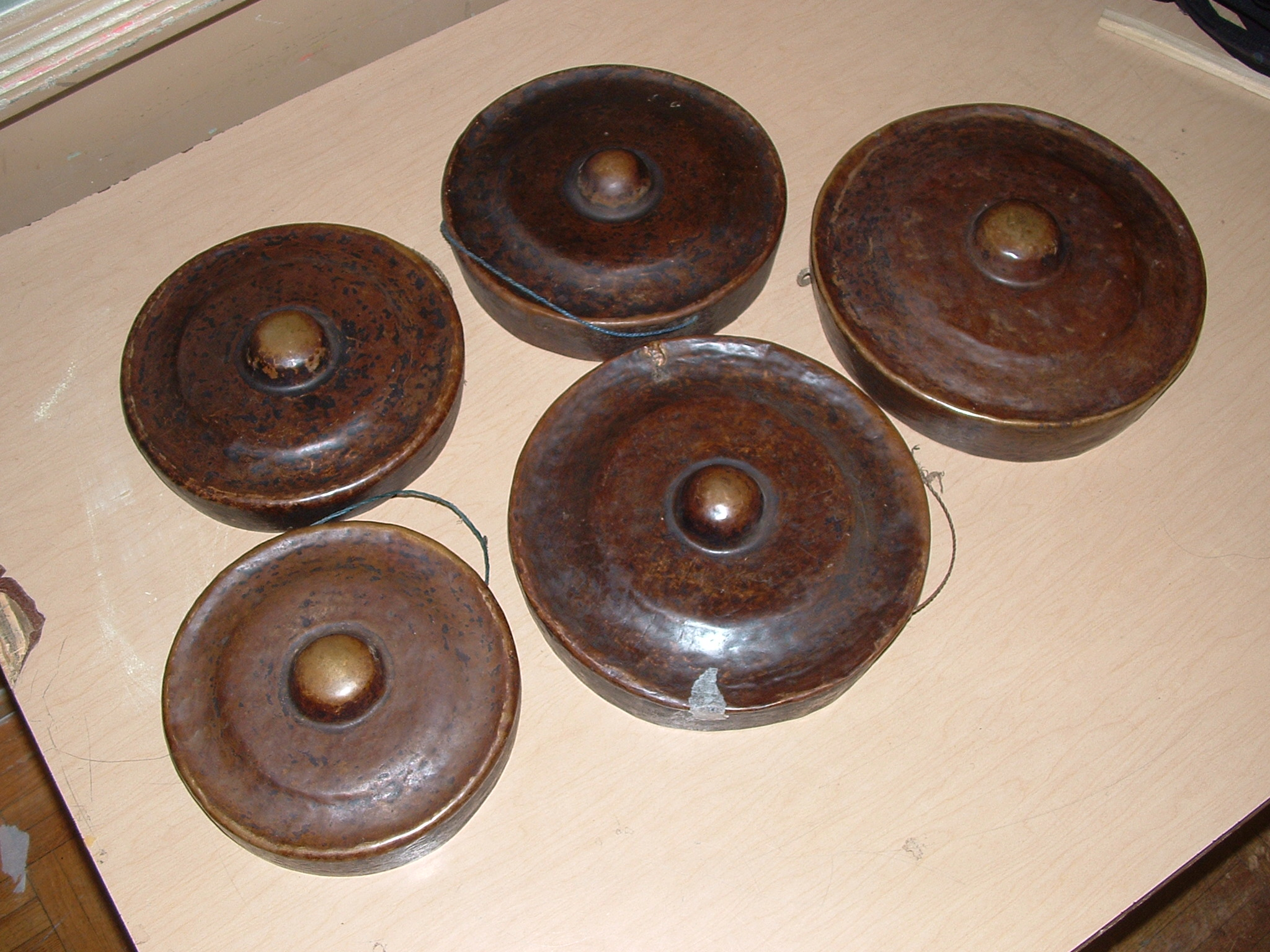
An antique bronze karatung set

The Tiruray call their agung ensemble a kelo-agung, kalatong, or karatung. It is made up of five shallow bossed gongs of graduating size, each played by one person. The smallest, the segaron, is used as the lead instrument, providing a steady beat. The Manobo sagabong ensemble follows a similar format, consisting of five small gongs, each held by one musician playing a unique pattern with rubber mallets, interlocking with other parts. The T’boli and Palawan have similar agung ensembles: the T’boli ensemble is composed of three to four agungs with two to three of them collectively called semagi which play variations, and the other agung, tang, providing a steady beat. The Palawan call their ensemble, composed of four gongs, a basal. It includes one to two large humped, low-sounding agungs and a pair of smaller humped, higher-pitched sanangs which produce metallic sounds. The Subanon also have an agung ensemble similar to the Tiruray karatung, called a gagung sua.

Both the Bagabo and the B’laan refer to their agung ensemble as a tagunggo, a set of eight metal gongs suspended on a harness, which is played by two, three, or more people. Seven of the smaller-sized gongs produce a running melody with the eighth, largest gong playing syncopation with the other gongs to produce a particular rhythm. The Manabo also have an agung ensemble similar to the tagunggo, called a tagungguan.

The Kadazan-Dusun, located on the western coast of Sabah, refer to their agung ensemble as a tawag or bandil, which consists of six to seven large gongs in shoreline groups and 7–8 large gongs for those in interior valleys. In southwestern Sarawak, Bidayuh agung ensembles consist of nine large gongs divided into four groups (taway, puum, bandil, and sanang), while among the Iban of Sawarak, Brunei, Kalimantan, agung ensembles are smaller in comparison. Such ensembles can either perform alone or with one or two drums, played with the hands or wooden sticks, as accompaniment. They play either homophonically or in an interlocking fashion with the gongs. These agung orchestras often perform at many types of social events, including agriculture rituals, weddings, victory celebrations, curing rites, rituals for the dead, entertainment for visitors, and other community rituals.
