= Nhạc dân tộc cải biên =

Nhạc dân tộc cải biên is a modern form of Vietnamese folk music which arose in the 1950s after the founding of the Hanoi Conservatory of Music in 1956. This development involved writing traditional music using Western musical notation, while Western elements of harmony and instrumentation were added.

== Etymology ==
In Vietnamese, nhạc means "music," dân tộc means "nationality," and cải biên means "renovated."
