= Tamak' =

Unpitched percussion instrument

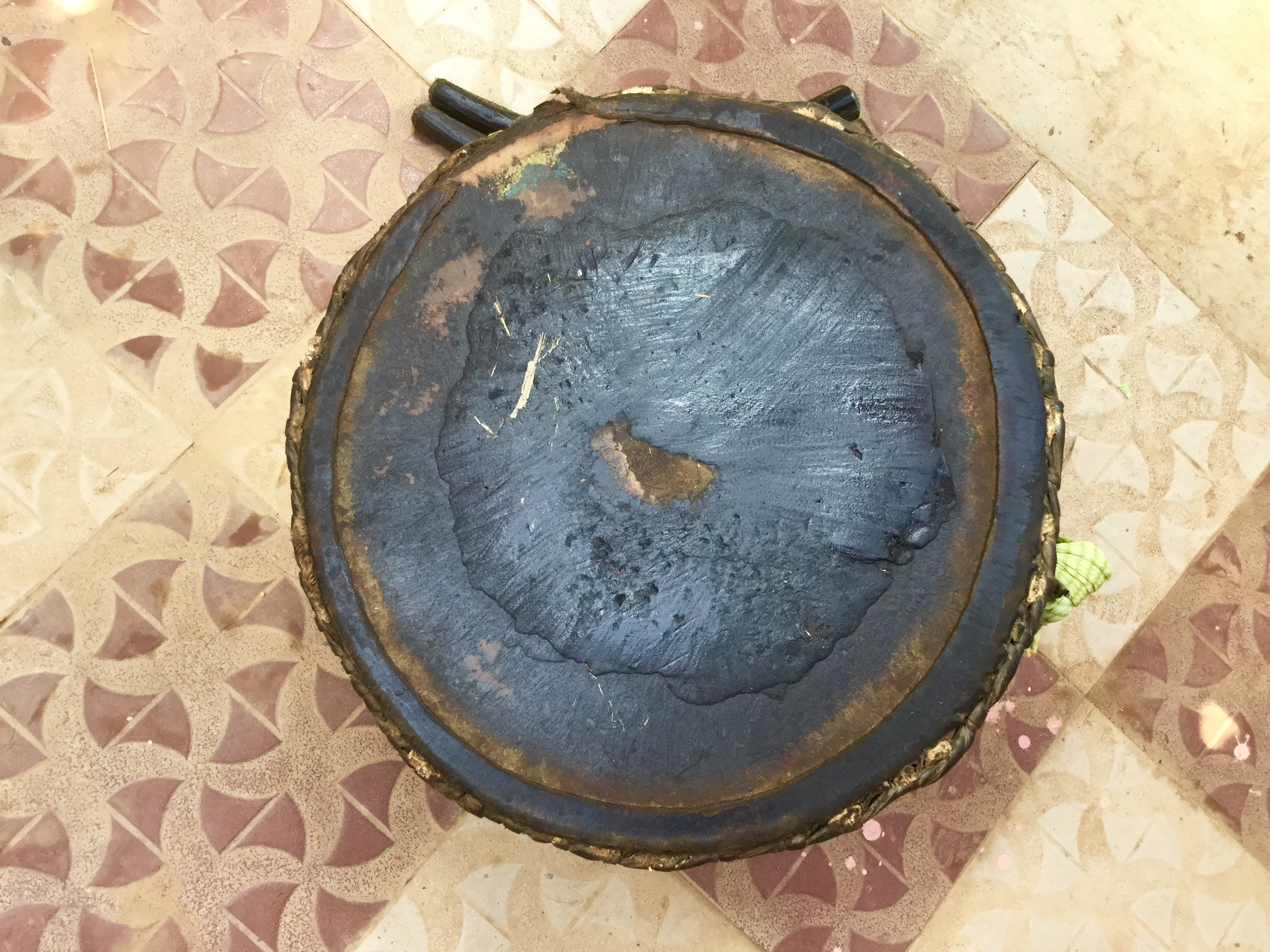
Traditional Instruments of Odisha - Tamak 02

Tamak

The tamak' is a stick-struck double-headed drum of the Santal people of the Indian subcontinent.

The body of the drum is made from metal and shaped like a large bowl. The head of the drum is usually cowhide and 14-18 inches in diameter. The player strikes the drum with a pair of drumsticks. The Santal believe that the tamak' has special religious powers and it is often used for religious ceremonies and Santal festivals. The rhythm of the tamak' often sets the basic metric/rhythmic pattern for Santal dances and is an essential instrument for traditional Santal music.

== See also ==
- Music of India
