= Shagur =

Wind instrument

Woodwind instrument
- Classification: Woodwind; Wind; Aerophone

Related instruments
- Ney; Duduk; Flute; Jedinka; Dilli Kaval; Shvi; Frula; Quray (flute); Kaval; Washint; Flute; Sybyzgy

Shagur is a wind instrument like an elongated flute like those of the Bashkirs and the Caucasians. The shagur is similar to the shoor and the khobyrakh but with holes on the side and made of wood. It's only about 30 to 40 cm long.
