= Music in the Altai Republic =

Music in a region of Russia

The Altai Republic is a region in Russia, composed primarily of ethnic Russians and Altaians. Prominent modern performers include Alexei G. Kalkin, who performs epics like Maadai Kara.

The Ministry of Culture of the Altai Republic operates several folklore organizations dedicated to preserving traditional culture, including music and dance, each dedicated to a particular region. These regions include Ust-Kansky District, Onguday, Kosh-Agach, Ust-Kok, Chemalsky, Shebalino, Gorno-Altaysk, Choysky District, Turachaksk, Ulagansky and Mayminsky Districts.

Traditional instruments from Altay include:

- Amirgi-Marok: a wind instrument used to coax deer
- Adishi-Marok: a wind instrument made of birch bark
- Ikili: a stringed instrument with a long neck and strings made from animal sinews and played with a bow
- Komus: a jaw harp made of wood traditionally, though now more frequently metal
- Shagay: a wind instrument made from the bones of a sheep
- Shagur: a wind instrument made of wood with holes on the side
- Shatra: a rattle
- Shoor: a long wind instrument, similar to a flute. Ergek shoor, tuyuk shoor, achyk shoor, altyn shoor.
- Topshur: two-stringed instrument, carved from pine and covered with leather, using strings made from horse tails and tuned to an interval of a fourth
- Ungurek: a wind instrument made of clay

The performance of traditional epics, accompanied by the topshur, is an important part of Altay music. These are usually narrated in a falsetto voice and enunciated in the low bass register. They are pentatonic and include melismatics. Performers include N. Ulagashev, P. Kutshiyak and Deley, while more modern vocalists include Aleksey Kalkin, S. Aetenov, Shunu Yalatov, Tovar Tchetsiyakov, Tanishpai Shinshin.

The most popular traditional musician from Altay may be Nohon Shumarov, from Yaman, a small village in the mountains, who worked in theater in Gorno Altaysk beginning in 1977. He now works at the School of Classical Music, which is the only institution of its kind in the region to teach traditional music. He has performed across Russia and Central Asia, as well as far away as Vietnam, Germany, Latvia, Austria, Slovenia, Switzerland and Lithuania.
