= Hujia =

Mongolian double reed instrument

Hujia (Chinese: 胡笳; Mongolian: 冒顿朝尔, or simply 朝尔) is a traditional Mongolian double reed instrument traditionally used to accompany khoomei (throat singing). The Eighteen Songs of a Nomad Flute was adapted from Hujia song in Han dynasty.

The hujia originated from an ancient nomadic people. It is now an important part of Chamber art among the Mongols together with Morin huur, Xinagan Chuur, Sihu, etc.

== History ==
The Hujia specifically originated from the peoples of north and west China. The instrument was not originally included in the eight-sounds classification system, however it gained popularity in China. According to Chinese traditions, Zhang Qian brought the instrument into China when he was sent from the west. It has been said that wind instruments such as the Hujia, along with drum instruments, are the products of exchanges between China and the North and West. In wartimes the Hujia played an important role. Liu Chou, a soldier during the Eastern Jin, drove away oncoming forces from the north by playing the Hujia and conjuring senses of home.

== Construction ==
The Hujia is an aerophone instrument with a double reed structure. However, it lacks the holes that are characteristic of a traditional aerophone instrument such as a Guan Zi.

== See also ==
- Ney
- Quray (flute)
- Kaval
- Washint
- Duduk
- Flute
- Jedinka
- Shvi
- Frula
- Guan Zi
