= Guqin tunings =

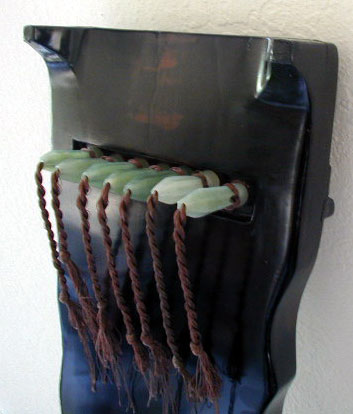
Tuning pegs of the guqin. The twisted cord goes through the bottom hole, through the side hole in the neck, around, under and through the hole in the neck again, and out the top hole. Pegs can be made from wood or jade

There are many different tunings for the guqin.

== Traditional tuning theory ==
To string a qin, one traditionally had to tie a butterfly knot (蝇头结; 蠅頭結; yíngtóu jié) at one end of the string, and slip the string through the twisted cord (绒扣; 絨剅; róngkòu) which goes into holes at the head of the qin and then out the bottom through the tuning pegs (轸; 軫; zhěn). The string is dragged over the bridge (岳山; yuèshān), across the surface board, over the nut (龙龈; 龍齦; lóngyín; 'dragon gums') to the back of the qin, where the end is wrapped around one of two legs (凤足; 鳳足; fèngzú; 'phoenix feet' or 雁足; yànzú; 'geese feet'). Afterwards, the strings are fine tuned using the tuning pegs (sometimes, rosin is used on the part of the tuning peg that touches the qin body to stop it from slipping, especially if the qin is tuned to higher pitches). The most common tuning, zheng diao (正调; 正調; 'proper tuning'), is pentatonic: 5 6 1 2 3 5 6 (which can be also played as 1 2 4 5 6 1 2) in the traditional Chinese number system or jianpu (i.e., 1=do, 2=re, etc.). Today this is generally interpreted to mean C D F G A c d, but this should be considered sol la do re mi sol la, since historically the qin was not tuned to absolute pitch. In fact the same tuning can also be considered as 5 6 1 2 3 5 6 when the third string is played as do. Thus, except when accompanied by other instruments, only the pitch relations between the seven strings needs to be accurate. Other tunings are achieved by adjusting the tension of the strings using the tuning pegs at the head end. Thus, mànjiǎo diào (慢角调; 慢角調; "slackened third string") gives 1 2 3 5 6 1 2 and ruíbīn diào (蕤宾调; 蕤賔調; "raised fifth string") gives 1 2 4 5 7 1 2, which is transposed to 2 3 5 6 1 2 3.

In early qin music theory, the word diao (調) meant both tuning and mode, but by the Qing period, diao meant tuning (of changing pitch) and yin (音) meant mode (of changing scales). Often before a piece, the tablature names the tuning and then the mode using traditional Chinese names: gong (宮, do), shang (商, re), jiao or jue (角, mi), zhi (徵, sol), yu (羽, la), or combinations thereof. A more modern name for tunings uses the word jun (均) to mean key or pitch of the piece, so for example, zhonglü jun (仲呂均; 仲吕均) means "F key", since zhonglü is the name of the Chinese pitch which Western equivalent is "F".

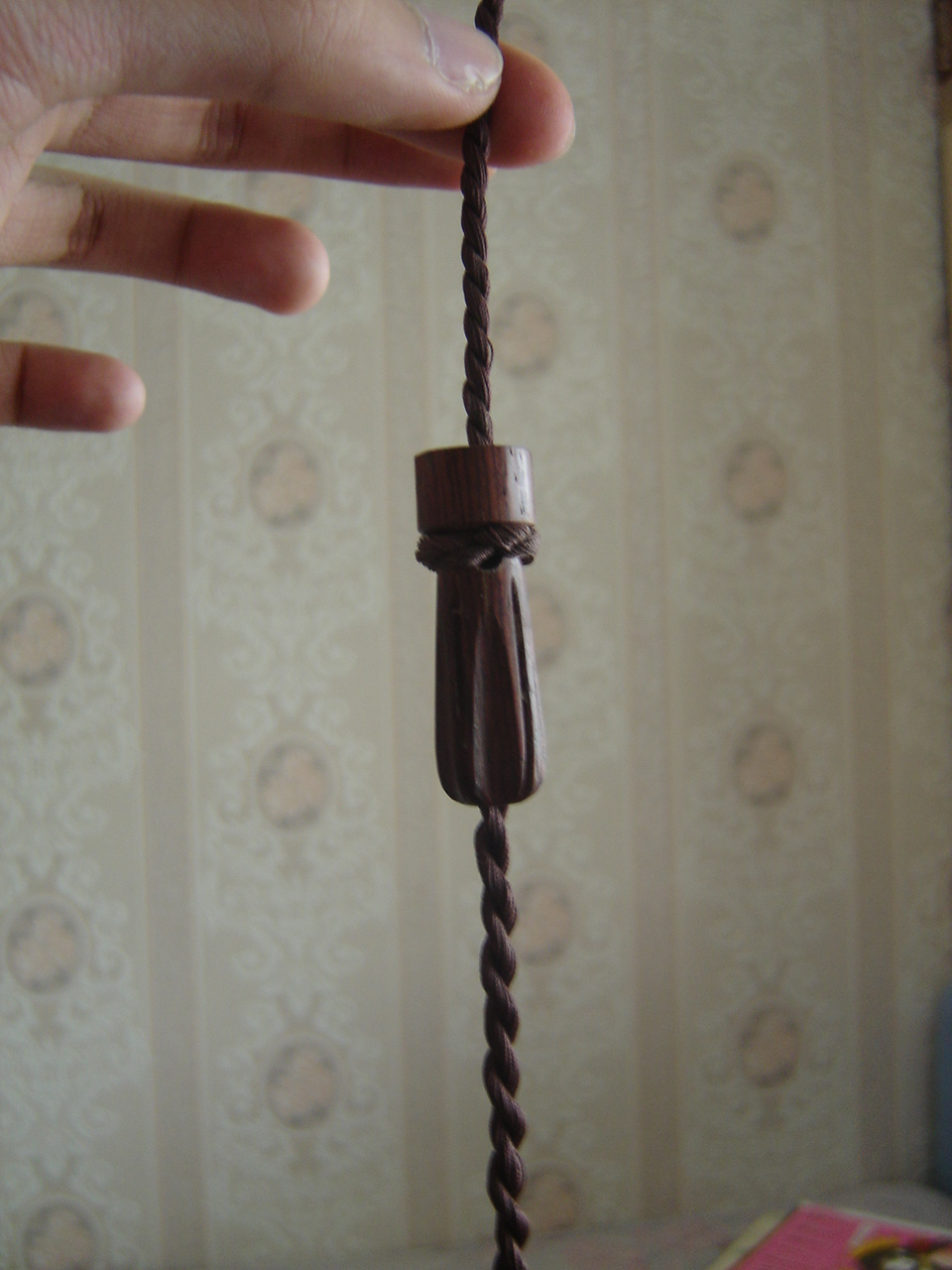
Close-up of standard wood tuning peg.

There are more than 20 different tunings used in qin music, out of which only between two and four are commonly used. Some of these, however, are actually alternate names for the same tuning. A single tuning can have several different names depending on which system the composer was taught and used; an additional confusion is caused by the fact that two different tunings can share the same name. For example, huangzhong diao (黄钟调; 黃鐘調) could mean either "lower first string and tighten fifth string" (e.g. Shenqi Mipu, etc.), "lower third string" (e.g. Qinxue Lianyao), or normal tuning (e.g. Mei'an Qinpu). Another potentially confusing problem is the naming of some of the tunings which may have misleading names, like the ruibin tuning. Ruibin is the name of the Chinese pitch which Western equivalent is "F♯", but that note does not appear or is used in the tuning, and so it is difficult to explain the logic in the naming.

Although Chinese music is often said to be pentatonic in scale, this is not strictly accurate. In qin music, if one examines the modes and scales, one can often find many pitches beyond a pentatonic scale. Examples include pieces like "Shenren Chang" [Harmony Between Gods and Men] which uses a lot of "strange" notes not much heard in modern Chinese music. One might say that Chinese music was not truly pentatonic in the beginning, but became so because of standardisation. Thus, many of the more "popular" Chinese instruments such as the erhu, dizi, or pipa adopted more purely pentatonic scales and modes, whilst the qin which was secluded from such standardisations kept much of the old tradition of music. We can see from older, more ancient scores, such as Youlan using such rare notes; comparing that to a more modern piece one can hear the difference in tonality, scales and mode.

== Method of tuning ==
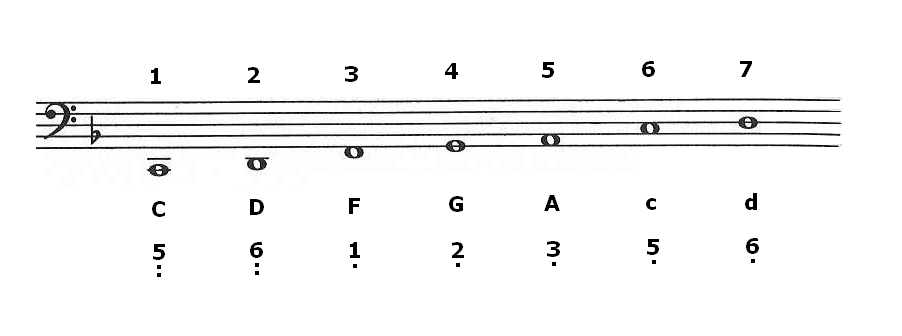
The standard scale of the guqin

The qin is one of a few instruments which changes the pitch tunings in order to change the key. The qin is tuned using the tuning pegs to adjust the pitch. The method of finding to right pitch to adjust to is straight forward. One way is to tune by ear, plucking the open strings and picking out the relation differences between the strings. This method way of tuning requires a very accurate sense of pitch. The next method is by comparing open and stopped notes, by playing an open string and pressing on another string at the correct position and adjust if they sound different. This has the advantage of only needing to adjust a string to match a reference note, but has the disadvantage of open and stopped notes sounding different in tone; it can only be used for pieces without harmonics. The generally preferred way is to tune by harmonics. This is the easiest method since it only requires that two sounded harmonics are in unison. Two harmonics are sounded on two strings and the pitch can be adjusted whilst they still sound.

== List of common tunings ==
Below is a list of common tunings for the qin. Note that some tunings have more than one scale and names, and that the relative relations are transposed (i.e., the do note is shifted to the appropriate string) in accordance with Chinese music theory. There can be several different names for a single tuning, and some even overlap, creating confusion. The table below uses the most common name for the tuning and lists the variants.

Note: This list is not exhaustive.

Name of Tuning (Chinese)		English name	Tuning method	Pitch relation	Relative relation	Key	Other names	Representing melodies	Listen to the scale being played
Standard
正調	Zheng Diao	Original Tuning	N/A	C D F G A c d	5 6 1 2 3 5 6	F	宮調, 仲呂調, 黃鐘調, 角調, 羽調, 林鐘調	《平沙落鴈》, 《梅花三弄》, 《流水》, 《漁樵問答》, 《漁歌》, 《神人暢》	
正調	Zheng Diao	Original Tuning	N/A	C D F G A c d	1 2 4 5 6 1 2	C	借調, 商調, 徵調, 商角調	《碣石調幽蘭》, 《醉漁唱晚》, 《龍翔操》, 《憶故人》	
Non-standard
蕤賔調	Ruibin Diao	Lush Guest Tuning	Raise 5th string	C D F G B_{♭} c d	2 3 5 6 1 2 3	B_{♭}	金羽, 清羽, 無射均	《瀟湘水雲》, 《陽關三曡》, 《龍翔操》, 《欸乃》	
慢角調	Manjiao Diao	Lowered Third-string Tuning	Lower 3rd string	C D E G A c d	1 2 3 5 6 1 2	C	角調, 黃鐘均, 林鐘調, 黃鐘宮	《風雷引》, 《鳳求凰》	
清商調	Qingshang Diao	Sharpen Re Tuning	Raise 2nd, 5th and 7th strings	C E_{♭} F G B_{♭} c e_{♭}	6 1 2 3 5 6 1	E_{♭}	商調, 夾鐘調, 小碧玉調, 姑洗調	《搗衣》, 《秋鴻》	
慢宮調	Mangong Diao	Lowered First-string Tuning	Lower 1st, 3rd and 6th strings	B D E G A B d	3 5 6 1 2 3 5	G	太簇調, 夷則均, 徵調	《挾仙游》, 《獲麟》	
慢商調	Manshang Diao	Lowered Second-string Tuning	Lower 2nd string	C C F G A c d	1 1 4 5 6 1 2	C	None	《廣陵散》	
無射調	Wuyi Diao	Wuyi Tuning	Raise 5th and lower 1st strings	B_{♭} D F G B_{♭} c d	1 3 5 6 1 2 3	B_{♭}	黃鐘宮調	《大胡笳》, 《小胡笳》, 《胡笳十八拍》, 《昭君怨》	
凄凉調	Qiliang Diao	Cold Misery Tuning	Raise 2nd and 5th strings	C E_{♭} F G B_{♭} c d	2 4 5 6 1 2 3	B_{♭}	楚商調, 外調	《離騷》, 《澤畔吟》, 《屈原問渡》	
側商調	Ceshang Diao	Besides the Re Tuning	Lower 3rd, 4th and 6th strings	C D E F_{♯} A B d	7_{♭} 1 2 3 5 6 1	D	None	《古怨》	
側商調	Ceshang Diao	Besides the Re Tuning	Lower 3rd, 4th and 6th strings	C D E F_{♯} A B d	1 2 3 4_{♯} 6 7 2	C	None	《古怨》	
無媒調	Wumei Diao	No Intermediary Tuning	Lower 3rd and 6th strings	C D E G A B d	1 2 3 5 6 7 2	C	None	《孤舘遇神》	
無媒調	Wumei Diao	No Intermediary Tuning	Lower 3rd and 6th strings	C D E G A B d	3 5 7 1 2 3 5	G	None	《孤舘遇神》	

== Footnotes ==
1. Personal correspondence with John Thompson (27 October 2005).
  "Today in China some people are arguing that the first string should be tuned to C (thus in standard tuning the 5th string is A), but there is no historical basis for this. [...] "tuned up to the standard pitch (5th string at A) without breaking" is misleading. There was no standard pitch for traditional qin music; if there was for Chinese music in general, this would change, as it has in the West. Today standard A may be 440 vib/sec but in the Baroque period it was a half or whole tone lower."
2. Li, Xiangting. Guqin Shiyong Jiaocheng 【古琴实用教程】. Page 105.
3. Lieberman, Fredric. A Chinese Zither Tutor: The Mei-an Ch'in-p'u. Pages 29–34.
4. Yang, Zongji. Qinxue Congshu 【琴學叢書】. Volume 8, folio 2, leaves 18-21.
