= Tsuur =

Traditional Mongolian instrument

Tsuur Цуур
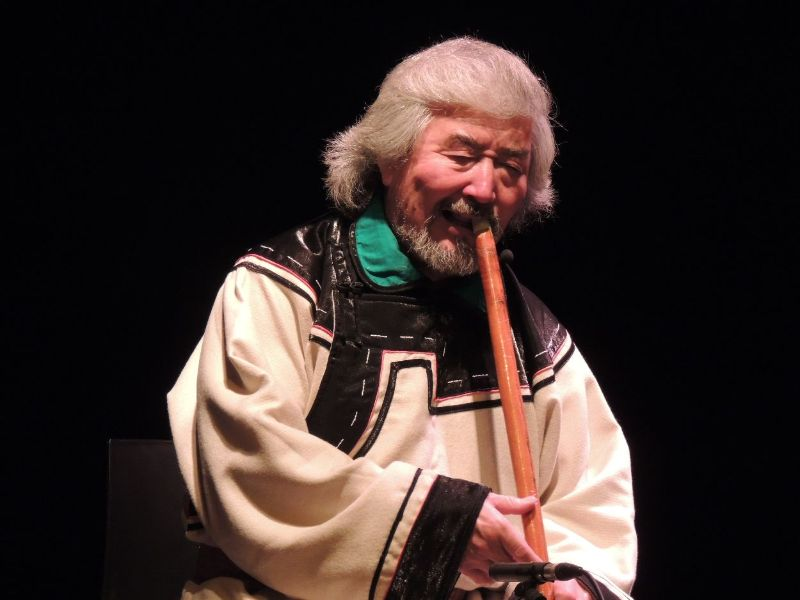
- Tsuur player

Woodwind instrument
- Other names: Choor, chuur (шоор)
- Classification: End-blown flute

Related instruments
- Sybyzgy, kurai

More articles or information
- Music of Mongolia

Traditional music of the Tsuur
- UNESCO Intangible Cultural Heritage
- Country: Mongolia
- Reference: 00312
- Region: Asia and the Pacific

Inscription history
- Inscription: 2009 (4th session)
- List: Need of Urgent Safeguarding

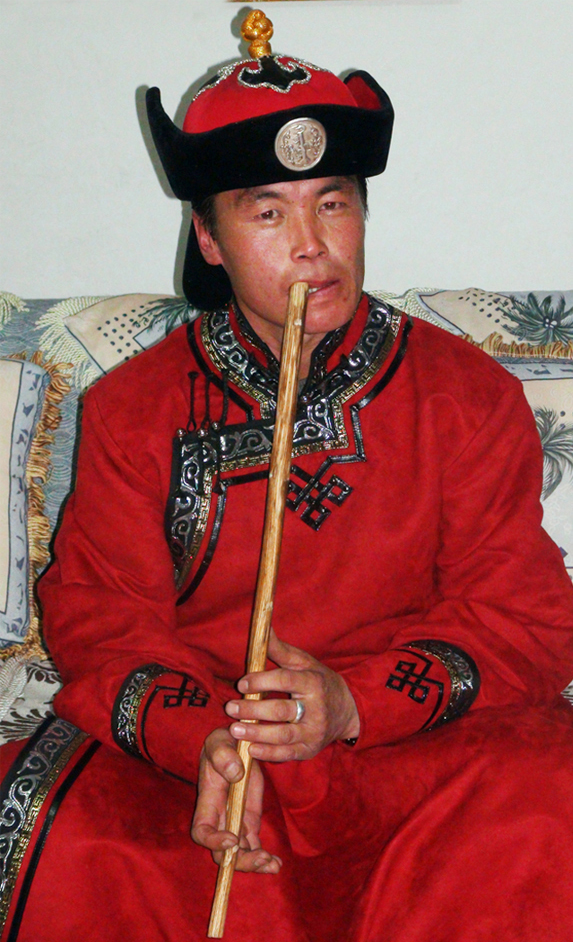
Tsuur player

The tsuur (цуур, Mongolian), choor (Kyrgyz), chuur (шоор, Tuvan), sybyzgy (Kazakh), or kurai (Bashkir) is an end-blown flute of varying lengths that is common among Inner Asian pastoralists.

In western Mongolia it is mainly used by the Altai Uriankhai people, although other ethnic groups like the Kazakhs and the Tuvans are known to play them or have played them.

The tsuur has only finger holes. The blowing technique utilizes the teeth, tongue, and lips in the same way as the ney used in Persian classical music. The tsuur is usually immersed in water before playing in order to seal any leaks in the wood.

The melodies that are played on the Tsuur are usually imitations of the sound of water, animal cries, and birdsongs as heard by shepherds whilst on the steppes or the mountain slopes of the Altai. One of the melodies, “The Flow of the River Eev,” represents the river where the sound of khöömii was mythically supposed to have originated. The Uriangkhai called the tsuur the “Father of Music”. A three-holed pipe was in use in Mongolia in the 18th century and was believed to possess the magical properties of bringing lamb’s bones back to life. In the Jangar epic of the 14th century, the tsuur is said to have had a voice like a swan. This reference may also be indirectly a very early reference to khöömii, as the singing style sung with the tsuur is known as Khailakh.

Traditional Mongolian tsuur music was added to the List of Intangible Cultural Heritage in Need of Urgent Safeguarding in 2009.

== See also ==
- Music of Mongolia
- Limbe (instrument)
- Ney
- Quray (flute)
- Kaval
- Washint
- Duduk
- Jedinka
- Shvi
- Frula
- Sybyzgy
- Shagur
