= Hu Jia =

Hu Jia may refer to:

- Hu Jia (activist) (born 1973), Chinese pro-democracy and HIV/AIDS activist
- Hu Jia (diver) (born 1983), Chinese Olympic diver

== See also ==
- Hujia, a traditional Mongolian instrument
