= Shebalino =

Name of several Russian rural localities

Shebalino (Russian: Шебалино) is the name of several rural localities in Russia:

- Shebalino, Altai Krai, a selo in Shebalinsky Selsoviet of Biysky District of Altai Krai
- Shebalino, Altai Republic, a selo in Shebalinskoye Rural Settlement of Shebalinsky District of the Altai Republic
- Shebalino, Volgograd Oblast, a khutor in Shebalinovsky Selsoviet of Oktyabrsky District of Volgograd Oblast
