= Shaghur =

Shaghur could refer to the following places:

- Al-Shaghur, Damascus, a neighborhood in Damascus, Syria
- Shaghur, Israel, a municipality incorporating the towns of Majd al-Krum, Deir al-Asad and Bi'ina in Israel between 2003 and 2008
- Shaghur Valley, the Arabic name for the Beit HaKerem Valley in Galilee, Israel

== See also ==
- Shagur, a wind instrument
