= Chinese musicology =

Chinese musicology is the academic study of traditional Chinese music. This discipline has a very long history. Traditional Chinese music can be traced back to around 8,000 years ago during the Neolithic age. The concept of music, called yue (simplified Chinese: 乐; traditional Chinese: 樂; pinyin: yuè), stands among the oldest categories of Chinese thought; however, in historical sources, it does not receive clear definition until the writing of the Classic of Music (lost during the Han dynasty). Different musical traditions have influenced it throughout its history, dating back to the Xia and Shang dynasties.

== Music scales ==
The first musical scales were derived from the harmonic series. On the Guqin (a traditional instrument) all of the dotted positions are equal string length divisions related to the open string like 1/2, 1/3, 2/3, 1/4, 3/4, etc. and are quite easy to recognize on this instrument. The Guqin has a scale of 13 positions all representing a natural harmonic position related to the open string.

The ancient Chinese defined, by mathematical means, a gamut or series of 十二律 (Shí-èr-lǜ), meaning "twelve lü," from which various sets of five or seven frequencies were selected to make the sort of "do re mi" major scale familiar to those who have been formed with the Western Standard notation. The twelve lü approximate the frequencies known in the West as the chromatic scale, from A, then B♭, through to G and A♭.

== Scale and tonality ==
Most Chinese music uses a pentatonic scale, with the intervals (in terms of lü) almost the same as those of the major pentatonic scale. The notes of this scale are called gōng 宮, shāng 商, jué 角, zhǐ 徵 and yǔ 羽. By starting from a different point of this sequence, a scale (named after its starting note) with a different interval sequence is created, similar to the construction of modes in modern Western music.

Since the Chinese system is not an equal tempered tuning, playing a melody starting from the lü nearest to A will not necessarily sound the same as playing the same melody starting from some other lü, since the wolf interval will occupy a different point in the scale. The effect of changing the starting point of a song can be rather like the effect of shifting from a major to a minor key in Western music. The scalar tunings of Pythagoras, based on 2:3 ratios (8:9, 16:27, 64:81, etc.), are a western near-parallel to the earlier calculations used to derive Chinese scales.

How the scales are produced: Start with a fundamental frequency. (440 hertz is used here.) Apply the ratios to make the first column. Copy the second and all further elements in this column to the respective heads of the other eleven columns. Apply the ratios to make the second through the twelfth columns. So doing produces 144 frequencies (with some duplications). From each column five different selections of non-adjacent frequencies can be made. (See the colored blocks at the far left.) So each column can produce 60 different pentatonic scales.

Putting the highlighted scales from the above image into musical notation gives:

Yu scale [yellow]

Shang scale [red]

Gong scale [green]

Jue scale [orange]

Zhi scale [blue]

== Interactions with the world before the 20th century ==
After being invented in the pre-Qin era, Chinese music was closely influenced by and influenced other cultures. In the ancient period, music was often associated with various factors, such as singing and dancing. It was a comprehensive art form, conveying themes including production, sacrifice, and anticipation for a better life. After China entered a slave society from a primitive society, the class division produced an occupational division of labor, and the initial stage of professional musicians appeared. Music was also used as a technique for the ruling class to show their power and social status.

Due to the restriction of China's geographical location, social development, and other conditions, music communication with the outside world first occurred in the east, south, and west of China. Early exchanges occurred among the Japanese, Korean, southwestern, and northern minorities. After the Han dynasty, China had a vast territory and prosperous economy, which laid the foundation for music communication between China and India, the Middle East, and other countries.

=== Xia and Shang dynasty ===
During the Xia dynasty, frontier nationalities came to the court to perform music and dance. In the Shang dynasty, there were local noble children coming from neighboring regions to study, and the content includes martial arts and music.

=== Zhou dynasty ===
As the Zhou dynasty replaced the Shang dynasty, music culture was improved unprecedentedly. The court collected and organized the existing music, established a musical hierarchy based on application, built music institutions, and conducted musical education. Yayue (雅樂) was established for rituals and ceremonies. At the same time, the Zhou emperors and its aristocracy incorporated foreign music into sacrificial ceremonies and feast performances. This promoted the inflow of music from surrounding areas.

=== Qin and Han dynasty ===
The Qin and Han dynasties had frequent contacts with Xiongnu (匈奴) in the north and music exchanges with the Western regions. For example, in the Han dynasty, the music of the ethnic minorities in the northwest was combined with the music of the Han dynasty to form the trumpeting music of early China. New instruments such as the Qiang flute (羌笛), the Pipa (琵琶), the Jia (笳), the Jiao (角), the Konghou (箜篌) were imported. One of the representative works of national cultural exchange is the Guqin song Eighteen Songs of a Nomad Flute (胡笳十八拍). In addition, the Han music bureau recorded "Song of the Harp," (箜篌引) which originated in Korea (see the external link section).

Buddhism was introduced to China from Tianzhu (today's India) around the 1st century AD (Han dynasty). In the following centuries, religious believers often incorporated Buddhist content into folk music to appeal to their followers and propagate their teachings.

From the end of the Western Han dynasty, the turbulence of history stimulated the ethnic minorities in the northwest to migrate south. As a result, Xianbei, Xiliang, Qiuzi, and Goryeo music were further integrated with the Han music of the Central Plains. Instruments including Waist drum (腰鼓), Capricorn drum (羯鼓), Gong, Quxiang pipa (曲项琵琶), and Five-stringed pipa (五弦琵琶) were introduced into the Central Plains.

=== Sui and Tang dynasty ===
The unification of the Sui and Tang dynasties and the deepening of the relationship between different ethnic groups provided favorable conditions for the further integration of music culture. From the fall of the Eastern Han dynasty to the establishment of the Sui dynasty, there were migration of Han people from the Central Plains to the south; and frequent wars, regime changes, internal migration of ethnic minorities in the North. The political and social turmoil significantly accelerated the decline of "elegant music" and the cultural exchanges between the Han nationality and other ethnic groups inside and outside China, especially in the Western regions, including Xinjiang, Central Asia, West Asia, and ancient India.

A particular category called Yan music refers to the music of palace parties in East Asia. A large portion of Yan's music, which includes vocal music, instrumental music, dance, and opera, is foreign. The internationalized Tang dynasty incorporated various foreign music, such as Indian, Korean, and Middle Eastern music, into its court music. During that period, there was immigration to the Korean peninsula and Japan. Influenced deeply by the tributary systems, these countries also sent oversea students and diplomats to China to bring back advanced music knowledge and other culture.

=== Yuan and Ming and Qing dynasty ===
During the Yuan, Ming, and Qing Dynasties, China had extensive musical interaction with the world. During this period, the Chinese brought their own music to the world and drew inspiration from foreign music. During the Ming dynasty, Chinese emperors presented musical instruments of yayue (雅樂) to the Goryeo and Joseon Dynasties, indicating that musical exchanges between China and Korea had reached a significant level. However, yayue was not revived in Joseon for some reason. In addition, ancient Korean folk music also absorbed elements of ancient Chinese music, and their similarities largely contributed to the fusion and exchange of musical styles between the two countries. However, Korean folk music also retains its inherent national characteristics, giving it a unique charm in musical style.

Among the many Chinese instruments introduced to the Ryukyu, the sanshin (三弦) was given special attention. This instrument was not only widely used in the Ryukyu Kingdom but was also copied and made by Japanese instrument makers. In addition, the Ryukyu Kingdom also absorbed the Chinese opera art form and developed a unique form of musical performance called kumi odori (クミヲゥドゥイ). This performance form is based on Sanshin's music, combines elements of poetry, music, and dance, and has a solid national style and exotic flavor.

In Japan, kabuki is a comprehensive variety of art combining foreign and local arts, and it has a long production history, which absorbed the essence of Chinese song, dance, and drama in its development to form a unique artistic style. In Kabuki, the performers often use some techniques from opera, such as makeup, costumes, and postures, all of which reflect the importance of Chinese culture in Kabuki. In conclusion, Chinese music, opera, dance, and other art forms profoundly influenced Japan's cultural development and promoted the exchange and integration of the two cultures.

In China, Western missionaries introduced Chinese music to Europe and European music to China. Because of their profound musical attainments, the Western missionaries could play various Western musical instruments and had an in-depth study and understanding of music theory. The early Qing emperors Shunzhi (順治) and Kangxi (康熙) both trusted and valued the learning of the Western missionaries, especially Kangxi, who made outstanding contribution to the exchange of music and culture.

The Kangxi Emperor learned music theory and other knowledge from many Catholic missionaries. These missionaries introduced European knowledge of music theory to China in an entire and systematical manner. During the Kangxi period, two books, Lülü Zuanyao (律呂纂要) written by Xu Risheng and Lülü Zhengyi — Continuation (律呂正義·續編), became the earliest formal introduction of European music theory knowledge in Chinese literature. These two books explained European music's fundamental theories and practical techniques in an in-depth, easy-to-understand manner.

Chinese musical culture interacted with European musical culture through the efforts of the Kangxi Emperor and the Western missionaries. During the early Qing dynasty, a large number of European envoys to China brought pipe organs and clavichords into China as tributes. Over time, these instruments gained popularity in court and society, becoming a vital part of musical events.

At the same time, the French missionary Joseph-Marie Amiot, who came to China in the latter half of the 18th century, also made significant contributions to Chinese music. He introduced Chinese music theory systematically to France and Europe and wrote many articles explaining this knowledge in detail. In particular, he translated the Chinese scholar Li Guangdi's Guyue Jingzhuan (古樂經傳, Interpretation of Ancient Chinese Music Classics) which aroused great interest among the Enlightenment pioneers in Europe at the time and brought more people to the field of Chinese music.

The sheng (笙), a Chinese free-reed mouth organ, was exported to Europe by Amiot. This instrument gained widespread acceptance and popularity in Europe and quickly led to the invention of three new, more popular instruments: the harmonica, the accordion, and the reed organ. The invention of these three instruments brought new elements and techniques to European musical culture.

== Interactions with the world after the 20th century ==
The twentieth century saw numerous successes and challenges for Chinese music due to people's changing perceptions of music culture. Modern Chinese music during and after this age not only relied on traditional Chinese music but also absorbed the advantages and skills of Western music. Chinese people's attitudes toward music have altered throughout this age of communication and integration, and the general public acknowledges its worth and spiritual significance.

=== Before People's Republic of China (PRC) ===
In the early 20th century, Chinese and Western music cultures slowly merged, driven by the external forces of art, to create a new style of Chinese music that was based on both cultures. Then, it was not until March 2, 1930, when the "League of Left-Wing Writers" was founded and its corresponding music criticism and music social activities, that the development of Chinese music entered the next stage.

One main change in the early 20th century happens in music education. In the pre-revolutionary ages, musicians did not have a high social status and they did not have a formal, standard way of training due to the Confucian ideology. Most of the content was taught orally and via rote practice. In the late 1800s and early 1900s, the introduction of western music theory and instruments also influenced how traditional music is taught. The National Music Conservatory (the Shanghai Conservatory of Music today) was founded in 1927, and soon became a role model for other music programs in China. The conservatory introduced a systematic way of training in Chinese music, including using printed music and building a universal standard for scoring and tuning.

From 1930 to the founding of PRC, music made great progress under the strong drive of political utilitarian purpose. People call for "national salvation", in the face of this politics, all social resources should be unreservedly for the service. This notion of music criticism is condensed in Chairman Mao Zedong's Speech at the Yan'an Forum on Literature and Art, published in May 1942. This work is also the most important work of music criticism and music practice from the early to long period after the formation of New China.

In the same period, while the politicians were making manifestos, musicians started to write Chinese music for western music instruments. Take piano for example, in 1934 the Chinese composer He Luting wrote a piece for piano called "A Shepherd’s Flute," which later became famous internationally. As a student at the National Music Conservatory, He Luting wrote this piece for a composition competition in Shanghai. A recording of this music is shared as an external link for readers to get a feeling of this style (see the external link section). An example shows how important the piano, a Western instrument, is for modern Chinese music that during the Cultural Revolution when most Western music instruments were banned, the piano was among the allowed instruments for the so-called "Model opera" at that time.

=== After People's Republic of China and Before Reform and Opening Up ===
Chinese musical creations during the founding years of the People's Republic of China, from 1949 to 1976, continued to serve a political utilitarian purpose, with new advancements in the wake of a unified China. Institutional change gave academic research a more stable atmosphere, Chinese music was available to a broader part of society, and the whole society had access to a broader variety of musical sources. During this time, Chinese music started to slowly gain popularity internationally. For instance, China prioritized participation in the World Youth Festival. China took part in seven World Youth Festivals consecutively during the course of the 14-year period from the second World Youth Festival in 1949 to the eighth World Youth Festival in 1962. Each festival's Chinese art troupe performances showcased the distinctive charm of Chinese music.

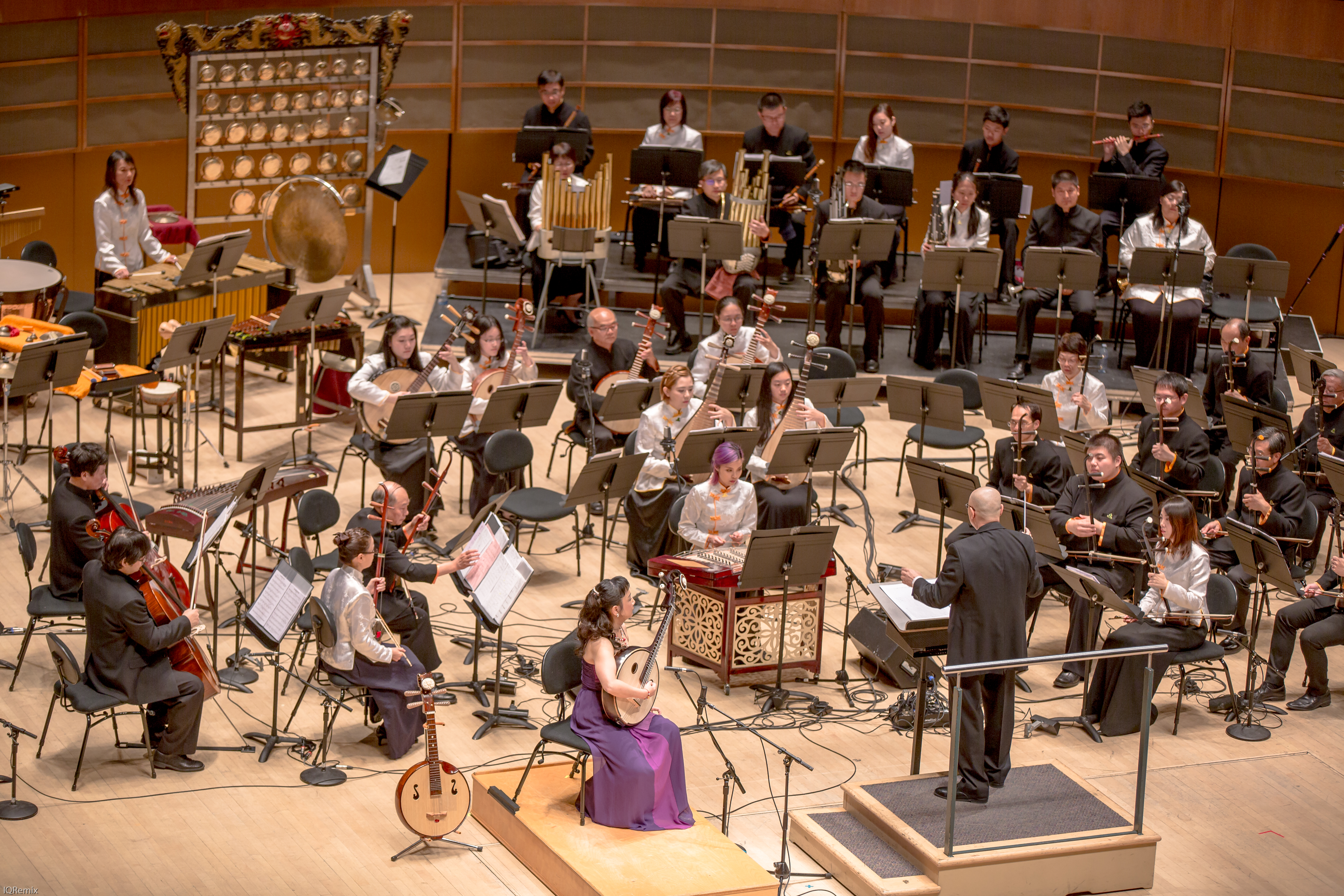
A Chinese orchestra in Edmonton

The invention of the Chinese orchestra is another great advancement. Ensembles are not new in Chinese music history, as large-scale ensembles are often used in important rituals or at the court. However, the Chinese orchestra based on the Western orchestra model first appeared in the 20th century, as the Shanghai-based musician Zheng Zhiwen's attempt to enlarge the size of traditional Jiangnan Sizhu (江南絲竹) ensembles and to compose music for each specific section. His idea was not popular in his time, but it laid the foundation for the modern Chinese orchestra. Different from monophonic traditional Chinese music of traditional ensembles, most pieces composed for a modern Chinese orchestra are polyphonic. More importantly, after the foundation of the PRC, the instruments of the Chinese orchestra were tuned to be equal-tempered, the same as Western instruments, rather than following the traditional sonic system introduced before.

=== After Reform and Opening Up ===
The next period was marked by the reform and opening up that ushered in a significant turning point for Chinese music. It is when China and foreigners frequently interacted with each other; it can be called the "new traditional" music period of China. We can divide the academic music research in China over this time into three stages: Chinese vision, global vision, and global vision under the Chinese vision.

A significant point in this period is the meeting "Forum of Young and middle-aged music Theorists" held in 1986, which was an excellent discussion of liberating the mind and pioneering the Chinese musicology circle after the reform and opening up. The core topic of the conference is Chinese music theory, researching how to face the contemporary international new literary trend, and how to apply the academic vision to the global field of music theory research. Since then, tremendous changes have taken place in the academic vision of musicology research in China, and new methods and achievements of musicology research in foreign countries have become the focus of the music community.

After this, the academic outlook on musicology research in China has significantly changed, and the music community is now concentrating on cutting-edge techniques and international musicology research accomplishments. As an example of this time period, in 2000, composer Dun Tan (谭盾) wrote the famous music piece Crouching Tiger Hidden Dragon (卧虎藏龙), which mixed traditional Chinese instruments, such as Erhu (二胡) and Pipa (琵琶), with Western orchestral instruments (see the external link section). At the same time, the boundary of music research is continually expanding, and it naturally interacts with and exchanges ideas with other social humanities disciplines, improving the meaning of musicology and raising that subject's status.

== Sources ==
- 陈应时 (Chen Yingshi, Shanghai Conservatory). "一种体系 两个系统 Yi zhong ti-xi, liang ge xi-tong". Musicology in China. 2002 (4): 109–116.
