= Irandyk =

"Irandek" (Bashkir: Ирәндек) is a Bashkir folk song.

== History ==
According to legend, the song was composed in the 18th century hunter and quray player Bulgair, enchanted by the beauty of the Irendyk ridge.

The first recording of the song "Irendyk" was made by S.Gabyashi and published in the book Başqort xalq yırźarı (Bashkir folk songs) in 1935. Recorded versions of the song have been performed by Akhmetov, Lebedinsky, Saltykov and Suleymanovym.

Versions of the song and its melody have been written by Kamaeva.

The song has a fervent dancing character and crisp rhythm with rising intonation.

== Lyrics sample ==
Bashkir

Һай!.. Иртәнсәкәй тороп, бер ҡараһам,
Уң ҡулында көмөш йөҙөк,
Ҡуш беләҙек, билкәй нәҙек,
Саңҡ-саңҡ итә Ирәндек бөркөтө
Һай!.. Саңҡ-саңҡ итә Ирәндек бөркөтө.

Өмөт өҙмәң, дуҫтар, был донъянан,
Уң ҡулында көмөш йөҙөк,
Ҡуш беләҙек, билкәй нәҙек,
Байрам булып китер бер көндө,
Һай!.. Байрам булып китер бер көндө.

Һай!.. Иркәләрмен, тинем, кис килермен, тинем,
Уң ҡулында көмәш йөҙөк,
Ҡуш беләҙек, билкәй нәҙек,
Ҡарттар күрер, ярамай, йәнем, ти,
Һай!.. Ҡарттар күрер, ярамай, йәнем, ти.

Һул битенән үҙен һурып үптем,
Уң ҡулында көмөш йөҙөк,
Ҡуш беләҙек, билкәй нәҙек,
Ҡарттар беҙгә ҡарамай, йәнем, тип,
Һай!.. Ҡарттар беҙгә ҡарамай, йәнем, тип.

Transliter

Өmөt өҙmәң, duҫtar, byl don#janan,
Uң ҡulynda kөmөsh jөҙөk,
Ҡush belәҙek, bilkәj nәҙek,
Bajram bulyp kiter ber kөndө,
Һaj!.. Bajram bulyp kiter ber kөndө.

Һaj!.. Irkәlәrmen, tinem, kis kilermen, tinem,
Uң ҡulynda kөmәsh jөҙөk,
Ҡush belәҙek, bilkәj nәҙek,
Ҡarttar kүrer, jaramaj, jәnem, ti,
Һaj!.. Ҡarttar kүrer, jaramaj, jәnem, ti.

Һul bitenәn үҙen һuryp үptem,
Uң ҡulynda kөmөsh jөҙөk,
Ҡush belәҙek, bilkәj nәҙek,
Ҡarttar beҙgә ҡaramaj, jәnem, tip,
Һaj!.. Ҡarttar beҙgә ҡaramaj, jәnem, tip.

English

In the morning arose, I looked,
On the right hand a silver ring,
Double bracelet, waist is thin,
Klekochet irendyksky eagle
Irendyksky eagle screams.

Do not lose hope, my friends, in this world,
On the right hand a silver ring,
Double bracelet, waist is thin,
Feast will come in one day,
Feast will come one day.

Caress, I said, I will come in the evening, I said
On the right hand a silver ring
Double bracelet, waist is thin,
Old people will see, you can not, O my soul, says (she)
Old people will see, you can not, O my soul says.

In the left cheek kissed her passionately I
On the right hand a silver ring,
Double bracelet, waist is thin,
Old people do not look at us, O my soul, saying,
Old people do not look at us, O my soul, saying.
