= Batuhan Aydın =

Turkish jazz musician and kaval player (born 1991)

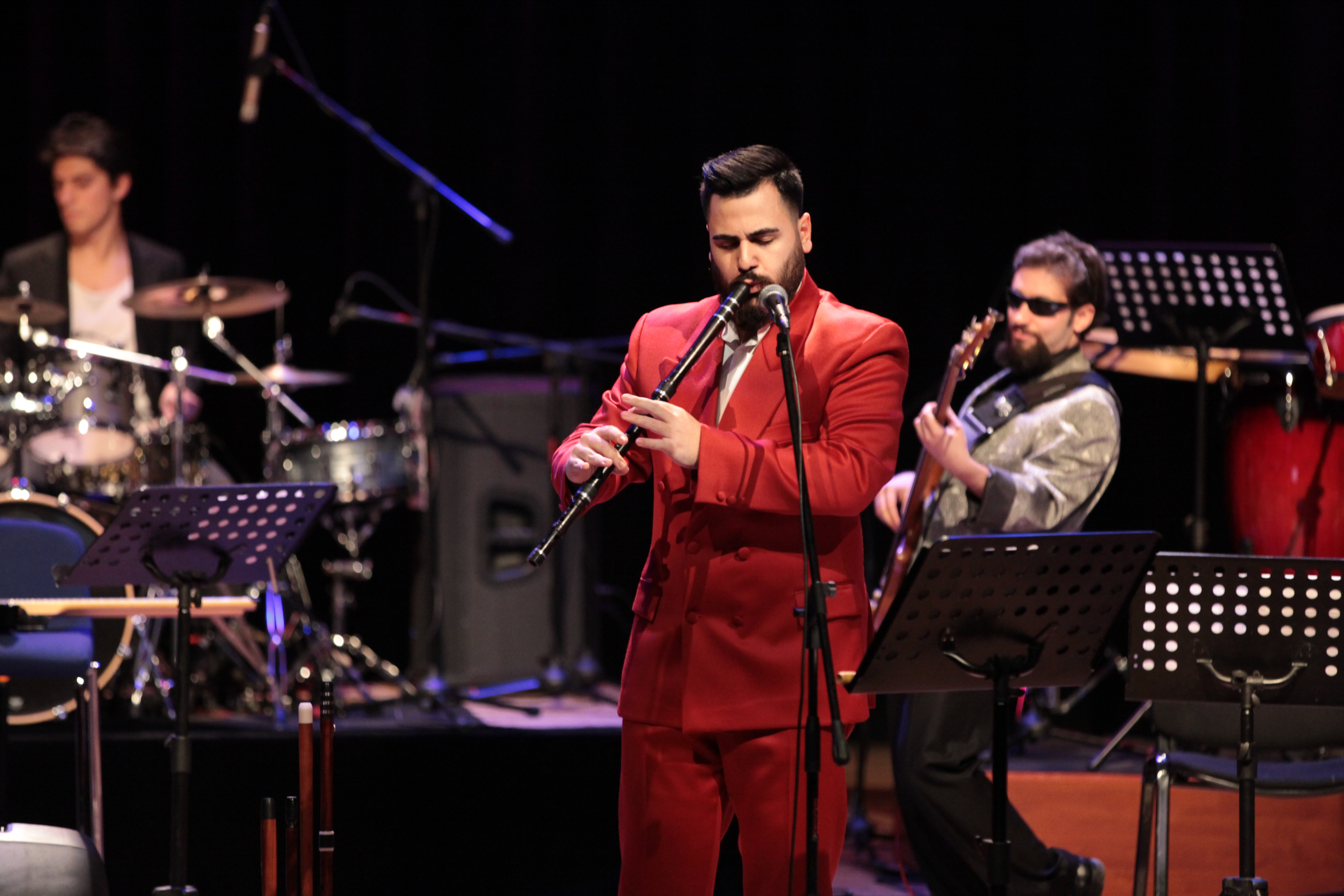
- Aydın performing in 2016

Background information
- Born: 14 July 1991 (age 34); Istanbul, Turkey
- Genres: Ethno jazz; Avant-garde jazz; Jazz fusion; World fusion; Folk music
- Occupations: Musician; Bandleader; Composer; Ethnomusicologist
- Instrument: Kaval
- Years active: 2010–present
- Website: Official website

Batuhan Aydın (born July 14, 1991) is a Turkish composer, ethnomusicologist, and kaval player based in Istanbul, Turkey. His work draws on Anatolian and Balkan folk traditions and incorporates jazz, improvisation, and contemporary musical forms. He treats the kaval within both traditional and experimental contexts, extending its use beyond regional performance practices.

== Biography ==
=== Early life and education ===
Batuhan Aydın was born in Istanbul on 14 July 1991. His mother’s family originates from the Ludogorie (Turkish: Deliorman, lit. 'mad forest') region of Bulgaria, while his father’s roots lie in Gümüşhane, a city in Turkey’s eastern Black Sea region. He grew up in an environment deeply shaped by his parents’ work as folk dance choreographers and folklorists, which played a formative role in his artistic development.

Aydın was admitted to the high school division of Istanbul Technical University’s Turkish Music State Conservatory, where he began formal training in the kaval.

Aydın continued his studies of the kaval with Prof. Lyuben Dossev (Bulgarian: Проф.д-р Любен Досев) at the Academy of Music, Dance and Fine Arts “Prof. Asen Diamandiev” in Plovdiv, Bulgaria. He later pursued academic research at the Department of Musicology at Istanbul Technical University’s Turkish Music State Conservatory and earned a master’s degree in Music and Performing Arts from Yıldız Technical University.

=== Career ===
From 2010 to 2013, he was a member of the Youth Orchestra of the Turkish Radio and Television Corporation (TRT). In 2014, he became the youngest instrumentalist to perform at the 1st International Kaval Conference in Istanbul.

He is the founding member and frontman of KAPIKO, an Istanbul-based ethno/world jazz and progressive fusion ensemble centered around the kaval. The ensemble draws on Anatolian and Balkan folk traditions in original compositions shaped through jazz and improvisational approaches. Its album Nova (2022) was listed among the best Turkish jazz albums of 2022 by the magazine Cazkolik. Formed in 2013, KAPIKO remains active and has performed at various international jazz festivals in Turkey and Europe. The ensemble also released the singles Viensko Horo (2022), in collaboration with Bulgarian drummer Stoyan Yankoulov, and Ethiopian Waltz (2023).

In 2022, Aydın released his composition Yana with Bulgarian producer Ivan Shopov (Bulgarian: Иван Шопов), marking his first electronic music collaboration. The work combines traditional musical material with electronic production techniques.

In 2024, Batuhan Aydın collaborated with Theodosii Spassov (Bulgarian: Теодосий Спасов) on Chifte Kaval (Bulgarian: Чифте Кавали, lit. 'two kavals'), a project for two kaval soloists and string orchestra featuring original compositions written for kaval and orchestra. The project brings together two prominent contemporary kaval performers from Turkey and Bulgaria. Based on the cultural and musical traditions of Anatolia and the Balkans, it reinterprets the kaval tradition as a dialogue between two solo voices within an orchestral setting. The project premiered on 5 June 2024 at the Cemal Reşit Rey Concert Hall in Istanbul.

In early 2026, Aydın founded the Batuhan Aydın Folk Quartet, a contemporary ensemble exploring Anatolian folk material through modern improvisational and harmonic approaches. The quartet features Nikolaus Grill on piano, Kağan Yıldız on double bass, and Ediz Hafızoğlu on drums. The quartet’s debut album Homewards (2026), made in collaboration with vocalist Jülide Özçelik, includes reinterpretations of Anatolian folk melodies and features guest appearances by Armenian-American composer and oud player Ara Dinkjian, a prominent figure in contemporary world music, Norwegian trumpeter Nils Petter Molvær, a key figure in nu-jazz, and Grammy Award-winning guitarist Cenk Erdoğan.

Alongside his performance career, Aydın conducts international workshops and masterclasses focusing on advanced kaval playing techniques and Bulgarian folk music. He has held teaching positions at various universities over different periods and has also appeared as a guest lecturer at other institutions.

== Discography ==
| Release year | Artist | Title | Release type |
|---|---|---|---|
| 2013 | KAPIKO | On Bierli | Album |
| 2018 | Balkan Blow | Veligdensko Oro | Single |
| 2022 | KAPIKO | Nova | Album |
| 2022 | Batuhan Aydın & Ivan Shopov | Yana | Single |
| 2022 | KAPIKO feat. Stoyan Yankoulov | Viensko Horo | Single |
| 2023 | KAPIKO feat. Ezgi İrem Mutlu | Ethiopian Waltz | Single |
| 2026 | Batuhan Aydın Folk Quartet | Homewards | Album |
