= Shi'er lü =

Set of notes used in Chinese music

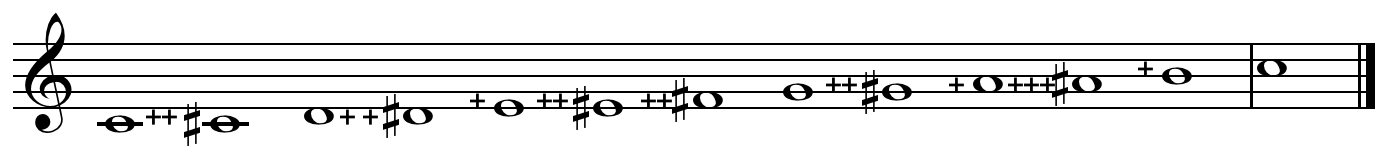
Shi'er lü on C.

Shi'er lü (Chinese: 十二律; pinyin: shí'èr lǜ; Wade–Giles: shih^{2}-êrh^{4} lü^{4}; lit. '12 pitches'; Mandarin pronunciation: [ʂɻ̩˧˥ aɚ˥˧ ly˥˩]) is a standardized gamut of twelve notes used in ancient Chinese music. It is also known, rather misleadingly, as the Chinese chromatic scale; it was only one kind of chromatic scale used in ancient Chinese music. The shi'er lü uses the same intervals as the Pythagorean scale, based on 3:2 ratios (8:9, 16:27, 64:81, etc.). The gamut or its subsets were used for tuning and are preserved in bells and pipes.

Unlike the Western chromatic scale, the shi'er lü was not used as a scale in its own right; it is rather a set of fundamental notes on which other scales were constructed.

The first reference to "standardization of bells and pitch" dates back to around 600 BCE, while the first description of the generation of pitches dates back to around 240 CE.

== Note names ==
Traditional Chinese	Simplified Chinese	Pinyin	English	Ratio	Audio
黃鐘	黄钟	Huáng Zhōng	tonic/unison	1 : 1	
大呂	大吕	Dà Lǚ	semitone	3^{7} : 2^{11}	
太簇	太簇	Tài Cù	major second	3^{2} : 2^{3}	
夾鐘	夹钟	Jiá Zhōng	minor third	3^{9} : 2^{14}	
姑洗	姑洗	Gū Xiǎn	major third	3^{4} : 2^{6}	
仲呂	中吕	Zhòng Lǚ	perfect fourth	3^{11} : 2^{17}	
蕤賓	蕤宾	Ruí Bīn	tritone	3^{6} : 2^{9}	
林鐘	林钟	Lín Zhōng	perfect fifth	3 : 2	
夷則	夷则	Yí Zé	minor sixth	3^{8} : 2^{12}	
南呂	南吕	Nán Lǚ	major sixth	3^{3} : 2^{4}	
無射	无射	Wú Yì	minor seventh	3^{10} : 2^{15}	
應鐘	应钟	Yìng Zhōng	major seventh	3^{5} : 2^{7}	

There were 12 notes in total, which fall within the scope of one octave. Note that the shí'èr lǜ-based mathematical method used by the ancient Chinese could never produce a true octave, as the next higher frequency in the series of frequencies produced by the Chinese shí'èr lǜ system would be higher than 880 hertz.

How the scales are produced. Start with a fundamental frequency. (440 hertz is used here.) Apply the ratios to make the first column. Copy the second and all further elements in this column to the respective heads of the other eleven columns. Apply the ratios to make the second through the twelfth columns. So doing produces 144 frequencies (with some duplications). From each column five different selections of non-adjacent frequencies can be made that never jump more than three available notes, and never jump two twice in a row. (See the colored blocks at the far left.) So each column can produce five different pentatonic scales, and with all the columns involved there are 60 pentatonic scales available to musicians.

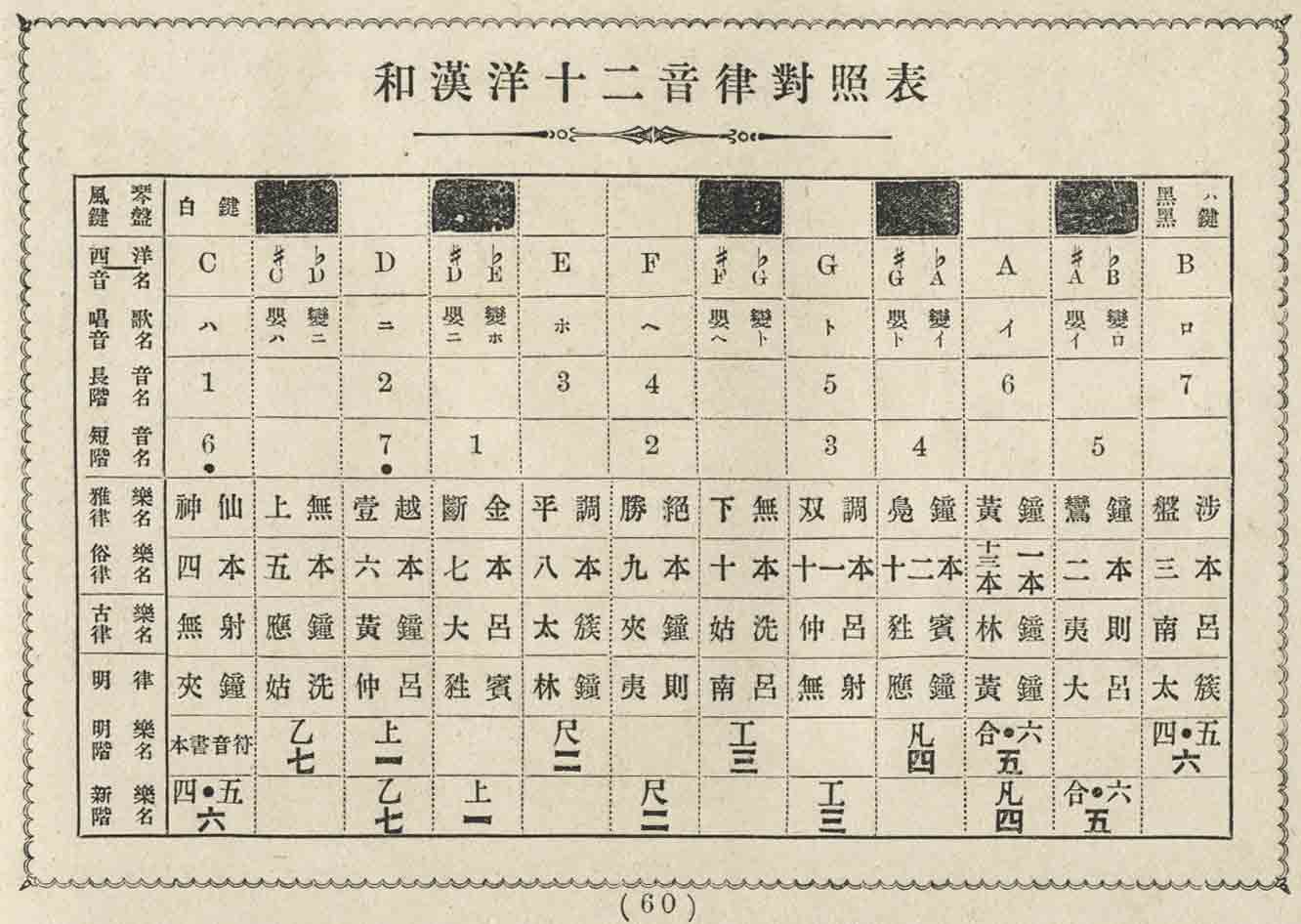
A comparative table of Eastern and Western notes of chromatic scale, from a book published in Kyoto in 1909. This table shows that the pitch of the first note Huang Zhong (黃鐘; huáng zhōng) is equivalent to D in Western classical music, while it was A in Ming era.

See the article by Chen Ying-shi.

== See also ==
- Chinese musicology
