= Lamzdeliai =

Lithuanian folk music instrument

Lamzdeliai (pipes) are traditional wind instruments in Lithuania. The instrument was popular during night herding, at young people's gatherings, and weddings. Lamzdeliai are used to play improvised herding melodies—raliavimai, ridovimai, and tirliavimai. Herders calmed their animals with these melodies, or they imitated the sounds of nature and birds. Other tunes played on the pipes were sutartines, songs, and contemporary dances (polka, waltz, mazurka, quadrille, and march).

Traditional lamzdeliai are made of either bark or wood. The bark pipe (zieves lamzdelis) is made in the springtime of a willow, aspen or pine sprout. The bark is beaten on all sides, and twisted off of the wood. The blowing end is closed off with a stopper made from the wood, with one side cut off. At the place where the stopper ends, a whistle hole is cut into the bark, and one end of the hole is bent slightly inwards. Three to six finger holes are cut in the pipe. Wooden pipes are made of ash or linden wood. The bark is removed, and the instrument is hollowed out by burning, drilling or carving. The blowing hole, whistle hole and finger holes are made in the same way as for the bark pipes. Lamzdeliai are usually tuned to a diatonic major scale. The timbre is soft and breathy, but when the instrument is blown too strongly, the sound becomes sharp and shrill.

== See also ==
- frula, Balkans
- duduk, Armenia and Turkey

== Sources ==
- Lithuanian Roots: An Overview of Lithuanian Traditional Culture. Lithuanian Folk Culture Center. 1998.
