= Sybyzgy =

Central Asia flute

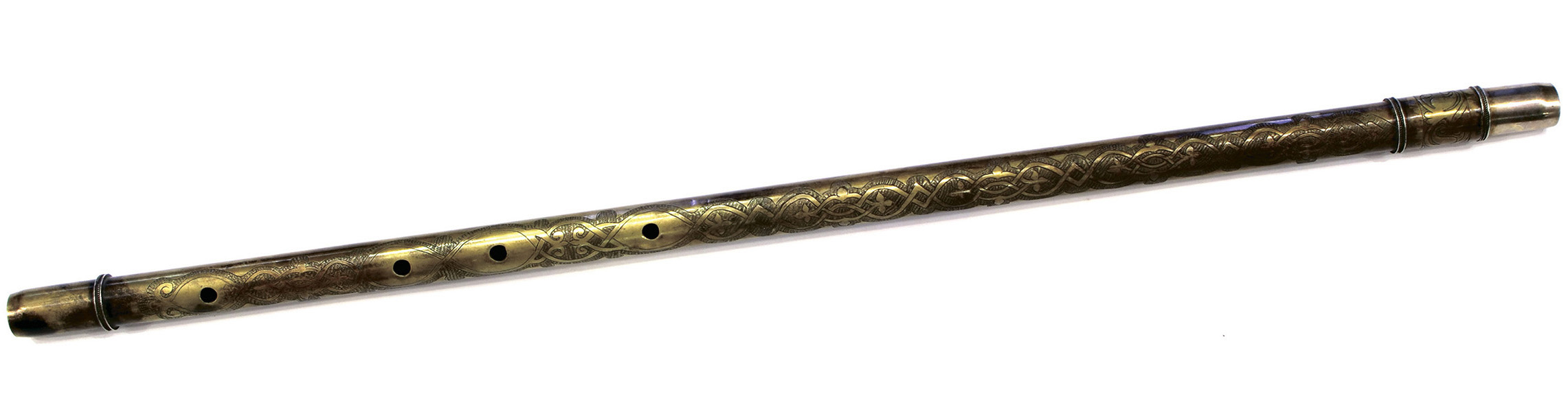

Sybyzǵy (made of copper)
- Classification: wind instruments, Woodwind instruments; Aerophone

Playing range
- With all openings 340 – 400 Hz, With all closed 210 – 230 Hz.

Related instruments
- Flute; Fife; Piccolo; Tin whistle

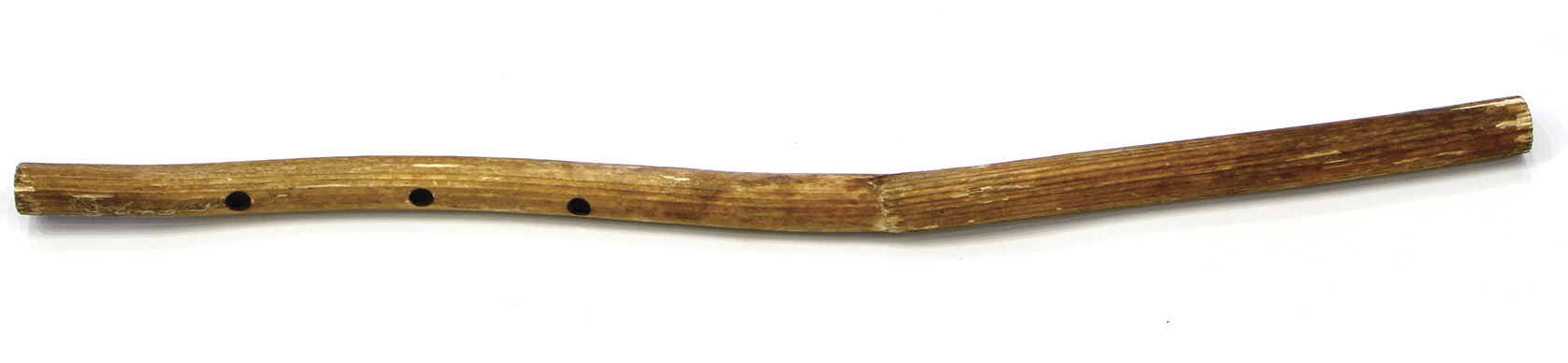
Sybyzǵy (Made of cane)

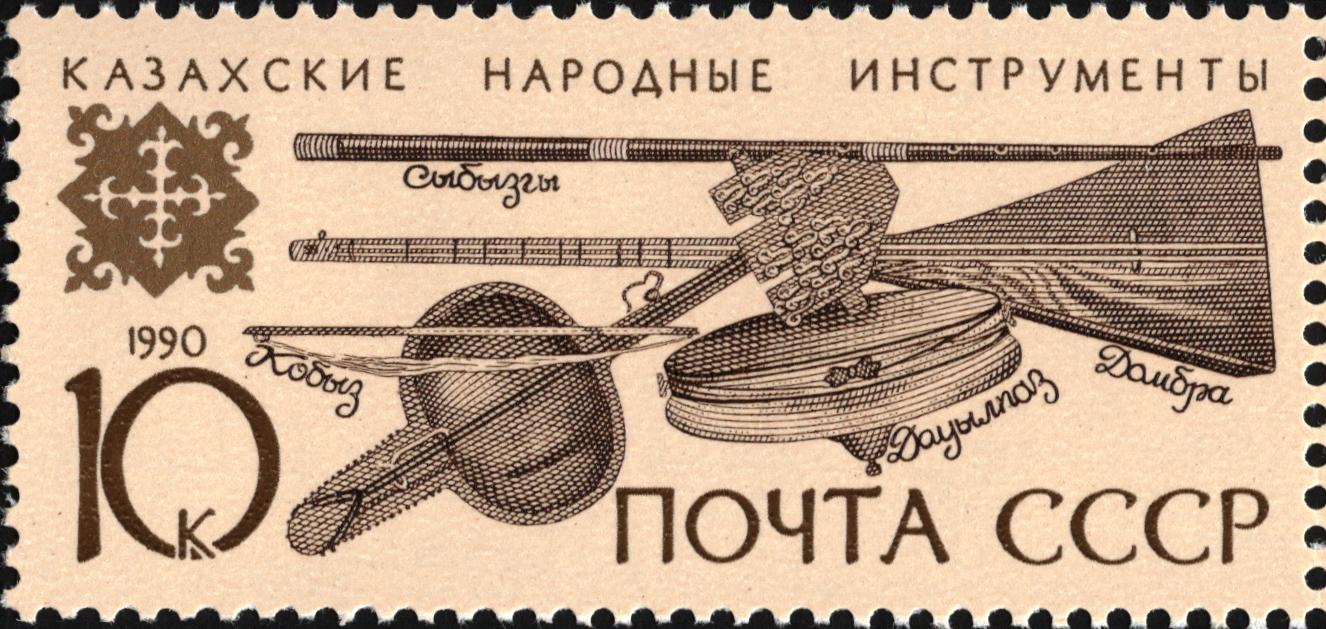
Sybyzgy (at the top) on a Soviet Union stamp.

The sybyzgy (Kyrgyz: сыбызгы, romanized: sıbızğı, Tatar: сыбызгы, romanized: sıbızğı, Karachay-Balkar: сыбызгъы, romanized: sıbızğı, Nogai: сыбызгы, romanized: sıbızğı, Chuvash: шӑкӑлчи, шӑхлич, romanized: şăkălçi, şăxliç, Uzbek: sibizg'a) is a Kyrgyz sideblown flute traditionally played by shepherds and horse herders, made from apricot wood or the wood of mountain bushes. With a length of 600–650 mm.

The traditional sybyzgy had 6 holes, however most modern sybyzgys are made with ten holes. Most modern sybyzgys are also have two separate pieces (one containing the finger holes and one for the mouth hole)

The Kazakh term Kazakh: сыбызғы, romanized: sıbızğı does not refer to the Kyrgyz sybyzgy but instead to another instrument, the Tsuur.

On the territory of Kyrgyzstan, there are two types of sybyzgy associated with different performing traditions. The eastern sybyzgy has a conical shape and is shorter and smaller in diameter, and the western variety is larger and longer.

The sybyzgy is an important instrument to the Kyrgyz people.
