= Dilli kaval =

Musical instrument

Dilli Kaval
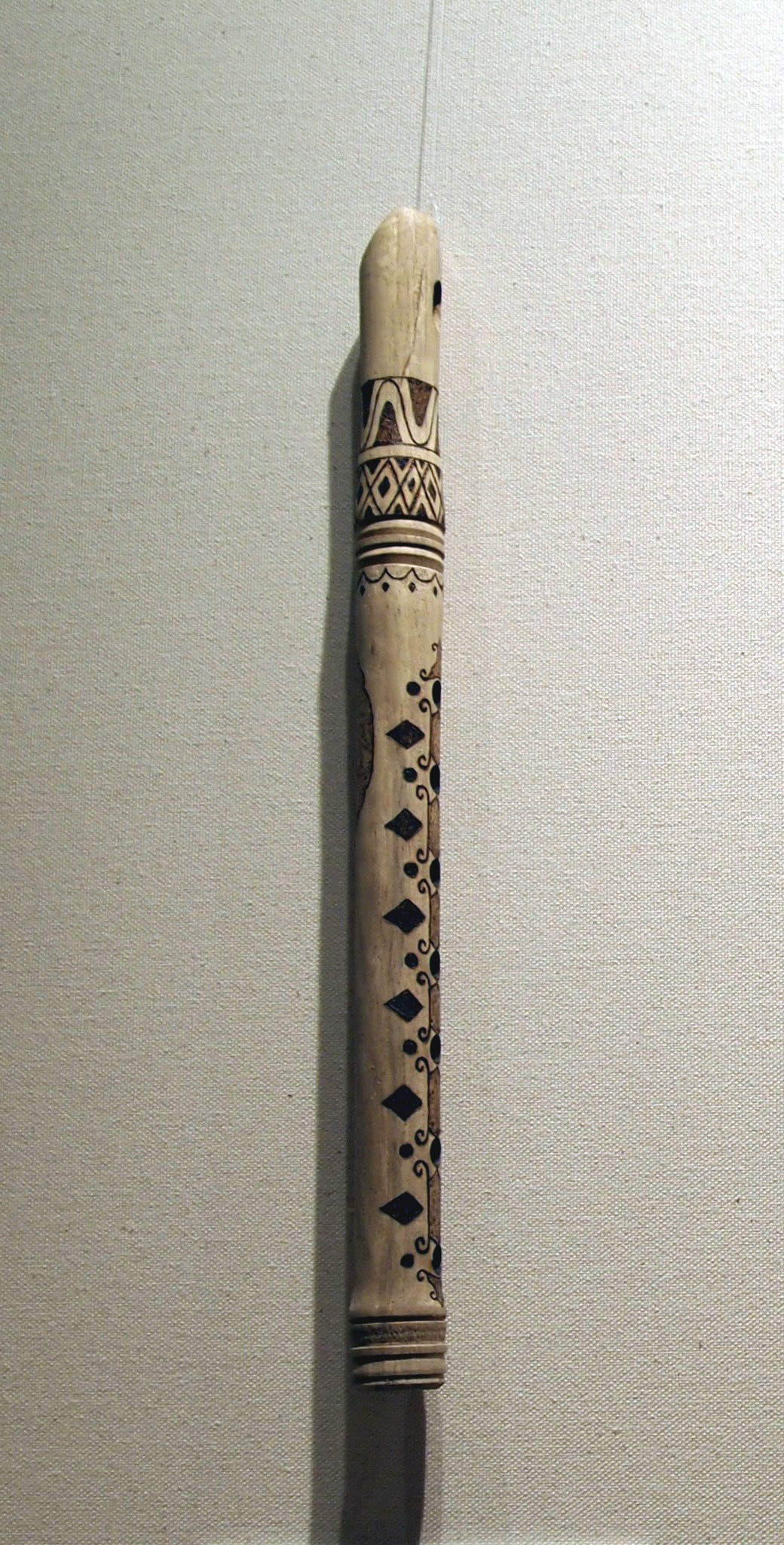
- Classification: Woodwind; Wind; Aerophone

Related instruments
- Shvi

The dilli kaval (Azerbaijani: Tütək) is a traditional fipple flute from Turkey and Azerbaijan. It is typically made of plum, ebony, or apricot wood. It has seven holes on the front and a thumb hole on the back. The lowest hole on the front is rarely, if ever, covered while playing. Similar to a penny whistle, the register can be controlled by the force of breath. The word "dilli" is Turkish for "tongued" and alludes to the fact that this flute has a duct or "fipple" rather than being rim-blown like a conventional kaval.

The soprano dilli kaval in C and the alto version in A are handmade. Both types were patented by Burhan Tarlabaşı. All 12 chromatic tones from Low A to High G# can be played on them.

Custom-made ebony-reed kavals in C# and F#, also designed by Burhan Tarlabaşı, are very rare. Their sound is very crisp and similar to tin whistles, but the wood adds a breathy softness.

== See also ==
- Kaval
