= Shebalino, Altai Krai =

Shebalino Шебалино
- Selo
- Location within Altai Krai Location within Russia
- Coordinates: 52°42′N 85°47′E
- Country: Russia
- Region: Altai Krai
- District: Biysky District
- Time zone: UTC+7:00

Shebalino (Russian: Шебалино) is a rural locality (a selo) and the administrative center of Shebalinsky Selsoviet, Biysky District, Altai Krai, Russia. The population was 1,105 as of 2013. There are 27 streets.

== Geography ==
Shebalino is located 49 km ENE of Biysk (the district's administrative centre) by road, on the Bekhtemir River. Bekhtemir-Anikino and Verkh-Bekhtemir are the nearest rural localities.
