= Shebalino, Volgograd Oblast =

Shebalino Шебалино
- Khutor
- Location within Volgograd Oblast Location within Russia
- Coordinates: 48°16′N 43°21′E
- Country: Russia
- Region: Volgograd Oblast
- District: Oktyabrsky District
- Time zone: UTC+4:00

Shebalino (Russian: Шебалино) is a rural locality (a khutor) and the administrative center of Shebalinovskoye Rural Settlement, Oktyabrsky District, Volgograd Oblast, Russia. The population was 763 as of 2010. There are 12 streets.

== Geography ==
Shebalino is located in steppe, on Yergeni, on the Myshkova River, 50 km northwest of Oktyabrsky (the district's administrative centre) by road. Chernomorovsky is the nearest rural locality.
