= Quray =

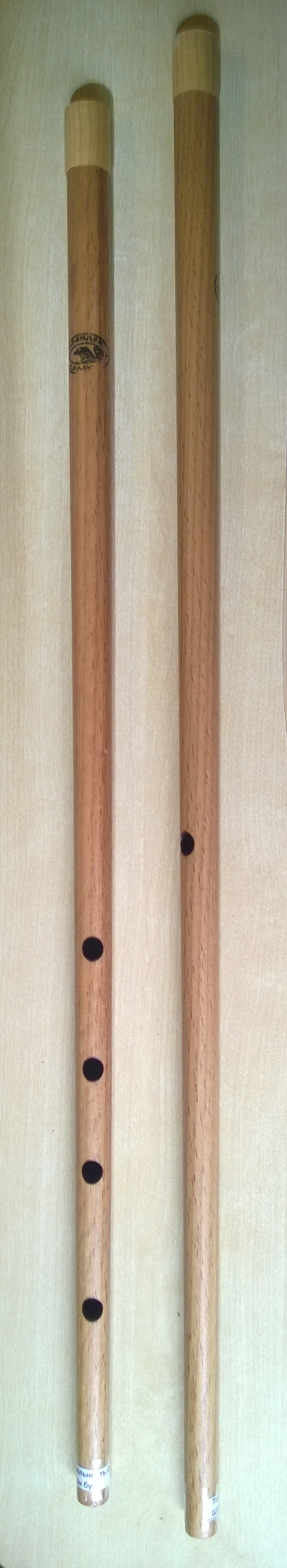
- Other names: Kurai, Kuray, Koray, Qurai
- Classification: woodwind instrument

Related instruments
- Ney - a similar Persian instrument; Flute; Jedinka; Dilli Kaval; Shvi; Frula; Murgu; Kurai; Kawala

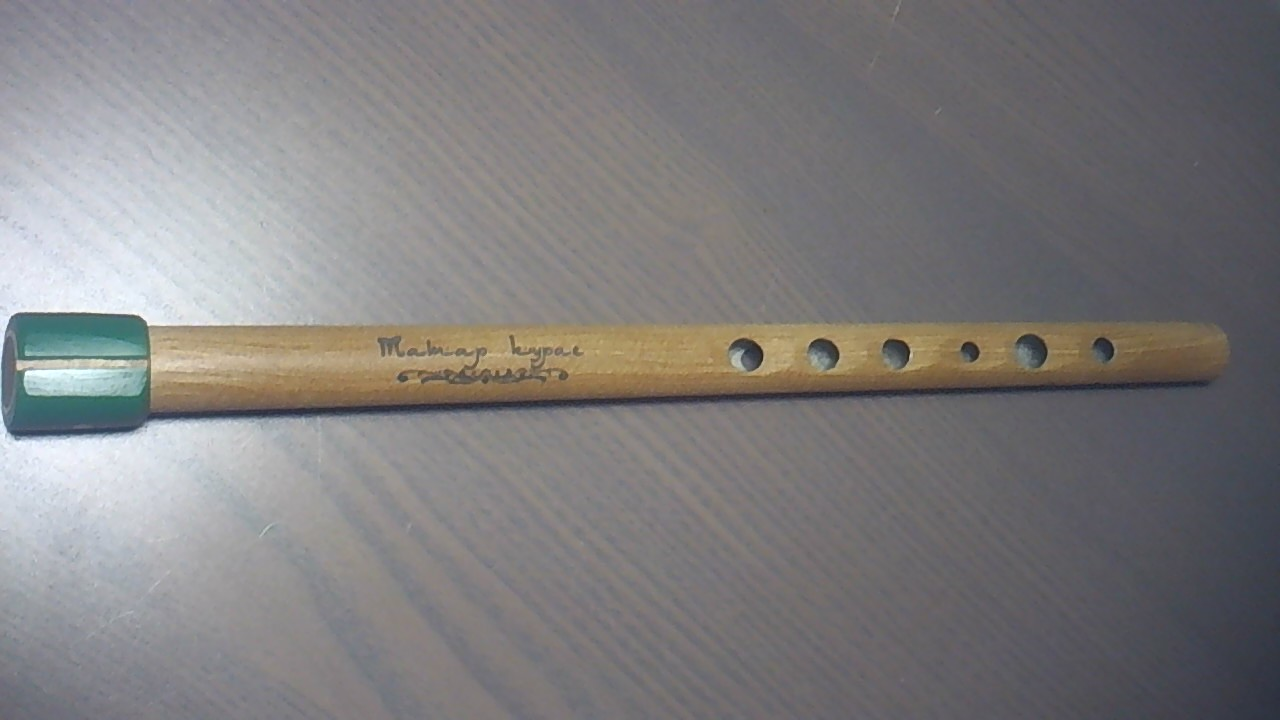
Tatar quray

The quray (Bashkir ҡурай, Tatar quray, [quˈrɑɪ]) is a long open end-blown flute with two to seven fingerholes, and is the national instrument of the Bashkirs and Tatars. The instrument is a type of Choor. On March 1, 2018 Kurai was registered as a territorial brand of Bashkortostan, a patent was received from the Federal Service for Intellectual Property of the Russian Federation.

The most widespread kind of quray is a quray made from the stem of the umbelliferous plant, called urals edgepistil or Kamchatka pleurospermum (Pleurospermum uralense). The stem of a quray is 2–3 metres (6 feet 7 inches – 9 feet 10 inches) long. It flowers in July, then dries out in August–September. It is cut in September and kept it in a dry and dark place. The length is found by measuring 8-10 times the width of a palm encompassing the stem of a plant. The first hole must be done at four fingers distance from the top of the plant, the next three holes at two fingers distance from each other, the fifth at the back at three fingers distance from the fourth hole.

The length of a quray is about 510–810 millimetres (20–32 inches). The diapason of a quray consists of three octaves. The quray is used as a solo as well as an ensemble instrument. Now, a quray can be made from veneer. It is more stable and its sound is similar to the natural quray's sound.

In addition to a grass quray some other types of quray are known:

- sor-quray - a sort of quray made by the Bashkirs who lived in the steppe where the natural quray does not grow. It is made of steppe grass and its length is not more than one meter, but it is wider in its diameter. The specialists say it was used for calling signals.
- copper quray - a quray made from copper. However, specialists disapprove of using this kind of quray, because it is harmful for the health.

The names of outstanding quray-players-improvisers include Kubagush-sasan, Baik-sasan, I. Murzakaev, G. Arginbaev, Y. Icyanbaev, I. Dilmukhametov, G. Suleymanov, K. Diyarov, R. Rakhimov, Y. Gaynetdinov, A. Aitkulov and R. Yuldashev.

There are many quray performers: laureates and diploma-winners of International Musical Folk Festivals, International Students' and Youth Festivals and all-Russian contests of performers of rare musical instruments.

There is a picture of a quray flower on the national flag and Bashkortostan state emblem.

== See also ==
- Kaval
- Ney
- Duduk
- Flute
- Jedinka
- Dilli Kaval
- Shvi
- Frula
- Murgu
- Txistu
