= Kaval =

Musical instrument

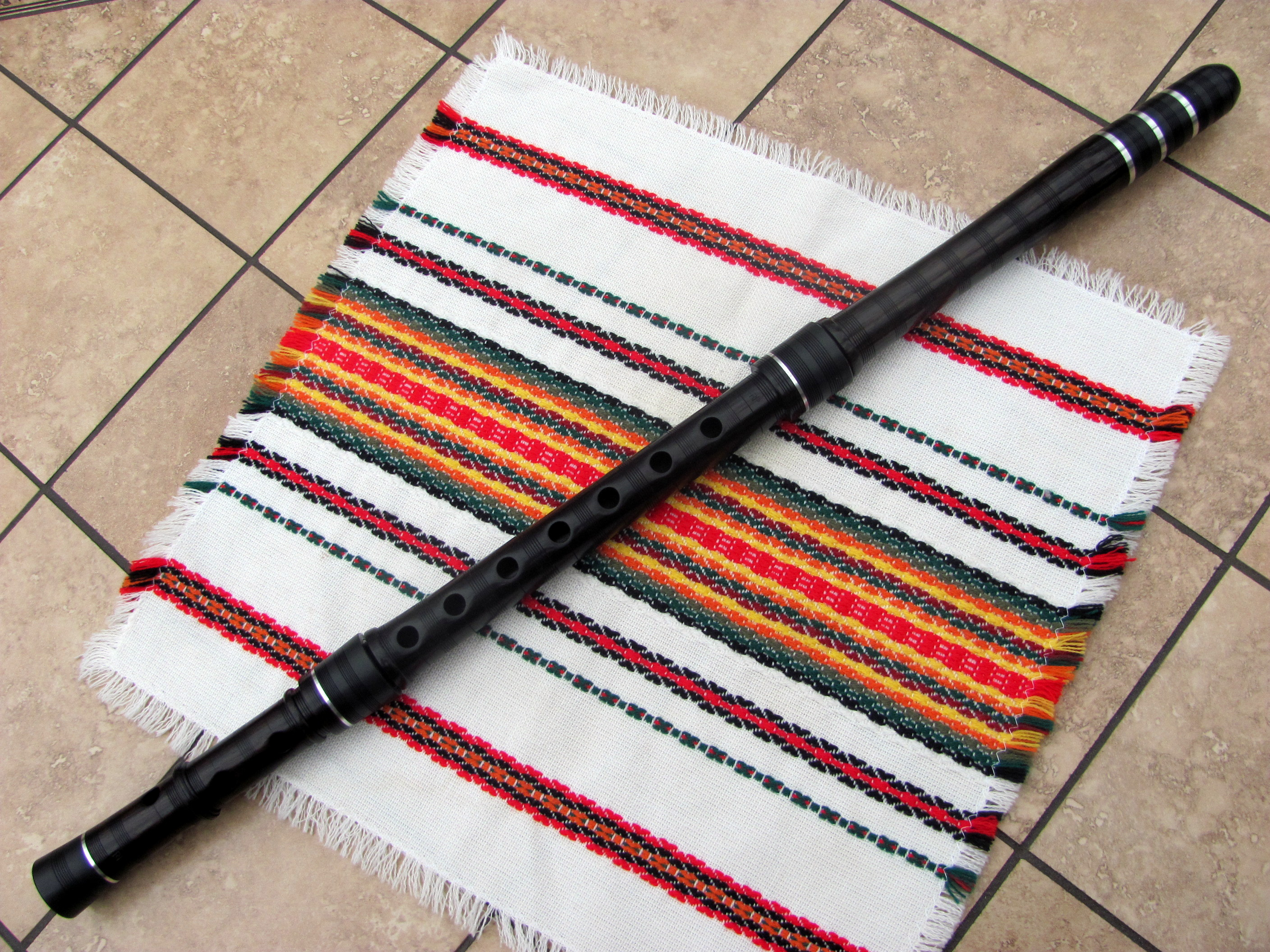
- Bulgarian kaval in key of D (Re), African blackwood, made in 2012 by master craftsman Radoslav Paskalev

Woodwind instrument
- Classification: Woodwind, Wind, Aerophone

Related instruments
- Çığırtma, Dilli Kaval, Duduk, Flute, Frula, Kawala, Jedinka, Ney, Shvi, Sring

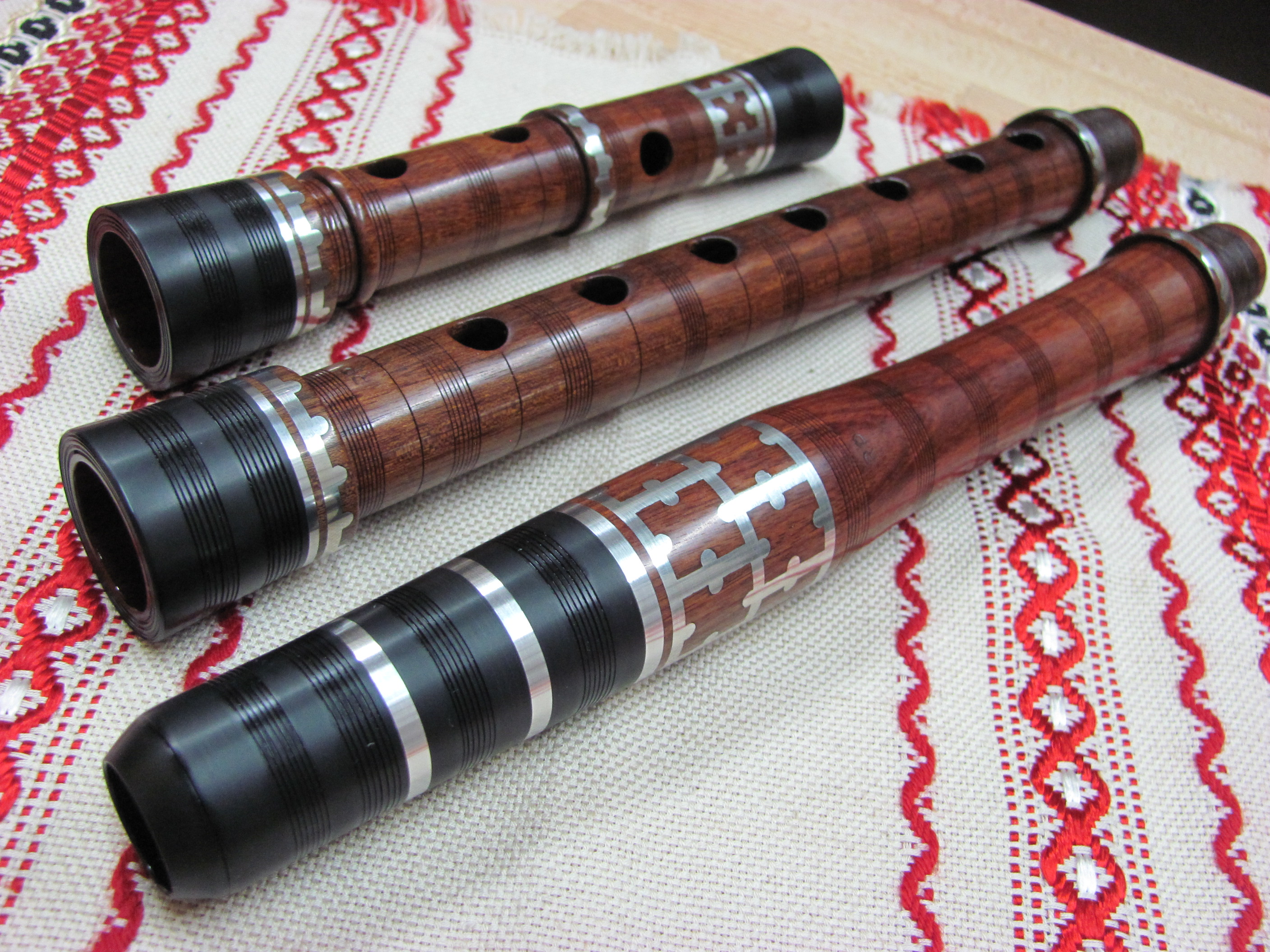
Bulgarian kaval in key of D (Re), Mopane wood, Pewter inlay - Wedding style kaval, made in 2012 by master craftsman Radoslav Paskalev, Virginia, USA

The kaval is a chromatic end-blown oblique flute traditionally played in the Balkans and Turkey. The kaval is primarily associated with mountain shepherds.

Unlike the transverse flute, the kaval is fully open at both ends, and is played by blowing on the sharpened edge of one end. The kaval has eight playing holes (seven in front and one in the back for the thumb) and usually four more unfingered intonation holes near the bottom of the kaval. As a wooden rim-blown flute, kaval is similar to the kawala of the Arab world and ney of the Middle East.

== Name ==
- Albanian: kavall, kaval
- Bosnian: kaval
- Bulgarian: kaval (кавал)
- Croatian: kaval
- Greek: kavali (καβάλι), gaval (γαβάλι)
- Hungarian: kaval
- Macedonian: kaval (кавал)
- Moldovan: caval
- Romanian: caval
- Montenegrin: kaval
- Serbian: kaval (кавал)
- Slovenian: kaval
- Turkish: kaval, guval, kuval

The instrument’s name may derive from the Turkish kav, meaning "hollow" or "empty", or the Arabic root q-w-l (قول), meaning "to speak", or qawwāl (قوّال), meaning "speaker".

== Construction ==
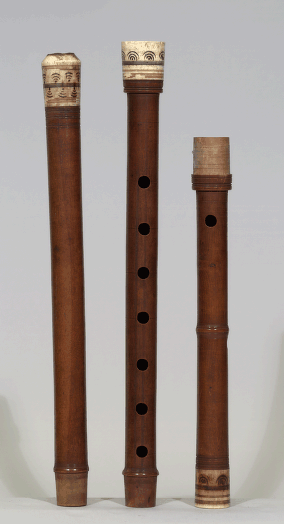
A 1919 Kaval. Bone ferrules decorated on the lathe with turned grooves and bird's eye decorations are applied with a preshaped cutting tool.

While typically made of wood (cornel cherry, apricot, plum, boxwood, mountain ash, etc.), kavals are also made from water buffalo horn, Arundo donax Linnaeus 1753 (Persian reed), metal and plastic.

A kaval made without joints is usually mounted on a wooden holder, which protects it from warping and helps keep the interior walls oiled. According to the key, the kaval can be in the high register (C, C#)???, middle (D, H) or low (A, B). The kaval plays two octaves and a fifth, in the chromatic scale. Its sound is warm, melancholic and pleasant.

== History ==
The kaval is primarily associated with mountain shepherds throughout the Balkans and Anatolia. Musician Pat MacSwyney suggests that the kaval spread with the Yoruks from the Taurus Mountains of southern Anatolia into the southern Balkans of southeast Europe.

While in the past it was almost entirely a shepherd's instrument, today it is widely used in folk songs and dances as part of ensembles or solo.

== Playing ==
Unlike the transverse flute, the kaval is fully open at both ends, and is played by blowing on the sharpened edge of one end. The kaval has eight playing holes (seven in front and one in the back for the thumb) and usually four more near the bottom of the kaval. These holes are not used for playing the instrument, but determine the lowest tone's pitch and timbre and are supposed to improve tone and intonation. In Bulgaria they are known as "devil's holes", based on a folk tale in which the devil tries to out-play a shepherd in a musical duel. While the shepherd is sleeping, the devil drilled holes in the shepherd's kaval but instead of ruining the kaval, this only served to enhance the shepherd's kaval playing thus thwarting the devil. In North Macedonia they are known as "glasnici" (гласници) meaning "giving voice to/of".

When played, the kaval is held with both hands, at an angle of approximately 45° to the side, with the four fingers of the one hand covering the lower holes; the upper three holes and the thumbhole are covered with the other hand. The mouth covers approximately three quarters of the end. Change of the breath air pressure also changes the pitch.

== Types ==
=== Bulgaria ===
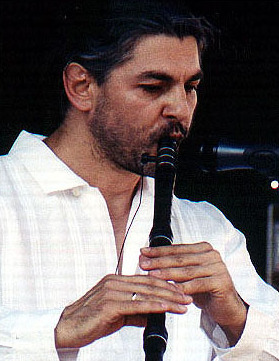
Bulgarian kaval player Theodosii Spassov performing on kaval

The kaval that is most common in Bulgaria is the one in middle (D) register. The kaval in lower (C) register is also not uncommon for this country. What is characteristic for the Bulgarian style of kaval performance is the diversity of sound shades and techniques. According to the pitch there are four different registers that can be achieved with the Bulgarian kaval. What controls which register the performer works in is mostly the air flow and to some extent the position of the mouth and the lips on the end of the kaval. A very characteristic sound of kaval is achieved in the lowest register. It could sound very mild and gentle if blown lightly while by changing the air stream a deeper (flageolet like) sound is achieved. This sound is so outstanding that some consider it another register that they call - kaba. It is also very interesting to notice that the technique of circular breathing is successfully utilized while playing the kaval. This technique lets the performer play without interrupting the air flow, while taking a breath through the nose. In the past it has been considered an extraordinary skill while nowadays it is used by more and more young performers.

The Bulgarian kaval, once made of a single piece of wood, is now constructed of three separate sections (of cornel, walnut, plum or boxwood), with a total length of 60 to 90 cm. Bone rings cover the joints, to prevent the wood from cracking. Metal decoration is also found. The finger-holes are located in the central section, while the lower (shorter) section has four additional holes called dushnitsi or dyavolski dupki (‘devil’s holes’); these are not covered in performance.

In the south-west Rhodope Mountains, two kavals in the same tuning (called chifte kavali) are played together, one performing the melody, the other a drone. This type of kaval is made from one piece of wood. A similar use of the kaval is also known in Macedonia and Kosovo, where one kaval of the pair (usually a lower one of a same key) is ‘male’, the other ‘female’.

=== Romania and Moldova ===
In Romania and Moldova there are three types of cavals: cavals from Moldova (with 6 holes), cavals from Oltenia (with 5 holes) and cavals from Dobrogea (similar to Bulgarian cavals). Their fundamental sound may be A, but for some instruments the lowest sound they can perform may vary between G and C. The Romanian cavals are ethnic instruments built by artisans (usually using two pieces, but there are older models made from a single piece) and therefore each instrument is unique in its own way. The Romanian caval in A has a playing range of two octaves (which lacks certain sounds).

The first five sounds belong to a minor scale with stage IV ascending chromatically. Grouped in this way they represent the low register of the instrument. These five sounds reappear one octave higher, complemented with the sounds F#, G and A, which complete the upper side of a mode of minor-melodic origin on A. The low pitched sounds between E and A cannot be obtained on the Romanian caval in A, which confers the instrument the special individualization of an “elliptic ambitus”. The last and most used octave is obtained without using the lip to cover the orifice by the head. The upper part of the playing range requires an increase in the pressure of the air column. The last four sounds also require more pressure. In the middle of the higher octave, the E2 sound can be obtained by two different pressure techniques, resulting in specific timbral effects.

=== Turkey ===
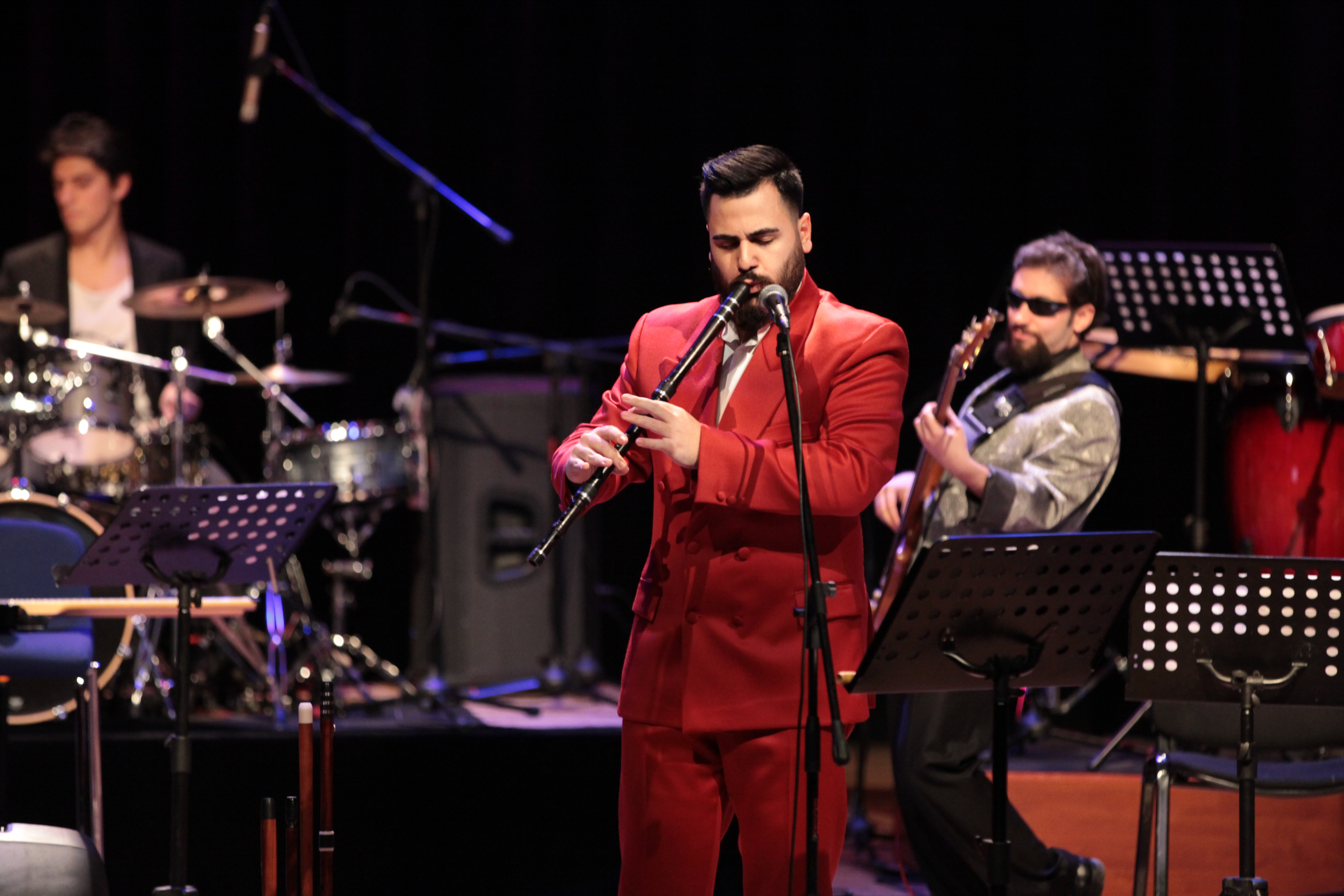
Turkish kaval player Batuhan Aydın performing on kaval

In Turkey the term 'kaval' is used generally to refer to all shepherd's pipes and more particularly (though not invariably) to ductless flutes. The presence or absence of a duct is sometimes specified by the addition of a qualification: dilsiz kaval ('kaval without a tongue'), dilli kaval ('kaval with a tongue'). Other qualifications may be added to describe materials, size or constructional features: kamiş kavalı ('reed kaval'), çam kavalı ('pine kaval'), madenı kavalı ('metal kaval'); cura kavalı ('small kaval'), çoban kavalı ('shepherd's kaval', i.e. long kaval); üç parçalı kavalı ('kaval with three parts'). The Turkish kaval can be made of wood, cane, bone or metal (usually brass) and has five or more finger-holes, one thumb-hole and sometimes additional unfingered holes like the Bulgarian instrument.

=== Greece ===
In Thrace and some of the Aegean Islands the term 'kavali' refers to an end-blown flute of the flogera family. It has seven finger-holes and sometimes an additional thumb-hole. In Greece's Macedonia the term kavali is also used to denote the souravli. In Epirus the end-blown kaval is known as dzhamara.

=== North Macedonia ===
There are five types of kavals in North Macedonia, according to their length and register:

- najmal kaval (smallest kaval) - length: 630 mm, basic tone: dis1;
- mal kaval (small kaval) - length: 672 mm, basic tone: d 1;
- kaval koj nema posebno ime ("no-special-name", nondescript kaval) - length: 700 mm, basic tone: cis 1;
- sreden kaval (middle kaval) - length: 752 mm, basic tone: c 1;
- golem kaval (big kaval) - length: 785 mm, basic tone: h.

The most used in North Macedonia's musical traditions are the smallest and nondescript kavals.

The North Macedonia's šupelka is similar to the kaval (open on both ends), except that it is shorter (240–350 mm). It can be made of either walnut, barberry, ash wood, maple or other wood. The šupelka plays the chromatic scale (two octaves), except the first note of the lower octave. In the low register, its sound is soft and pleasant, while in the upper register it is sharp and shrill.

=== Serbia ===
The kaval (cevara) is widely used in the musical traditions of Southern, Southeastern and Eastern Serbia.

Presentations of musicians on frescoes of medieval monasteries and churches of this side of the Balkans say that the kaval dates back to the medieval ages. On the side where it is being played, there is a sharp bird which enables the easier obtaining of the tone. The tone is obtained just when the kaval is being stuck to the lips semi-horizontally, or under the angle of 45 degrees, as the player blows straight.

=== Albania and Kosovo ===
The Albanian kavall is typically used by the Gheg Albanians of northern Albania, Kosovo, Montenegro, and North Macedonia and by Tosks south of Albania, especially in region of Gramsh. A kavall is traditionally made of wood. Lately, copper or even bronze has been employed. In Albania, it is called a "Fyell". Most of the melodies are called "Kaba" and "Vaj" which are melancholy, but considered beautiful. It has been said that shepherds sent messages with a kavall when threatened by thieves or in order to send romantic signals to their beloved.

=== Hungary ===
The kaval is used in Hungarian folk music. It is particularly popular amongst the Csango Hungarians in eastern Romania. Typically, the Hungarian kaval features five finger holes, measures around 60-80cm long, and is made from fruitwood. It is distinct from the furulya which is functionally different and is typically shorter.

== Related flutes ==
=== Svirka ===
The svirka (or tsafara, svorche, or little kaval) is a Bulgarian shepherd's flute, consisting of one wooden tube 25 to 50 cm long with six or seven holes for fingers, and a bone lip where it is endblown. It is played much like the kaval.

=== Armenia ===
The blul (Armenian: բլուլ) is an open end-blown shepherd's flute traditionally played in Armenia and similar in structure to the kaval. It is made of either reed or apricot wood and has eight playing holes, including seven finger holes and one thumb hole. The resulting sound is diatonic, the timbre is described as soft and velvety. The blul is associated with the sring flute and occasionally equated with it, which is also a common term for Armenian end-blown flutes in general.

=== Bashkirs and Caucasus ===
An open end-blown flute similar to the kaval is used by the Bashkirs and the Caucasians; it is called by such terms as khobyrakh, Quray and choor or shoor.

A typical khobyrakh is a 70 cm-wide, smooth, hollow pipe made of an umbel (hollow stem of a big, parasol-like umbellifer) or wood, with 3 or sometimes 6 finger-holes. Nowadays, it is also made of plastic.

== See also ==
- Dilli Kaval
- Frula
- Kawala
- Salamuri
- Shvi
- Sring
