= Eighteen Songs of a Nomad Flute =

Series of Chinese songs and poems

Eighteen Songs of a Nomad Flute (Chinese: 胡笳十八拍; pinyin: Hújiā Shíbā Pāi) are a series of Chinese songs and poems about the life of Han dynasty (202 BCE–220 CE) poet Cai Wenji. The songs were composed by Liu Shang, a poet of the middle Tang dynasty (618–907 CE). Later, in the Song dynasty (960–1279 CE), Emperor Gaozong (1107–1187 CE) commissioned a handscroll of the songs accompanied by 18 painted scenes.

== Inspiration ==
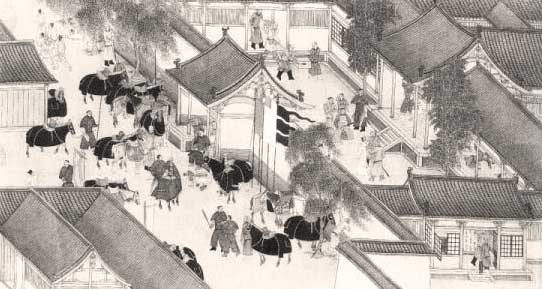
Abduction of Cai Wenji. Xiongnu armed with bows and their mounts have two different forms of horse armour. 14th century painting replica of 8th century original. Courtesy of the Metropolitan Museum of Art, New York.

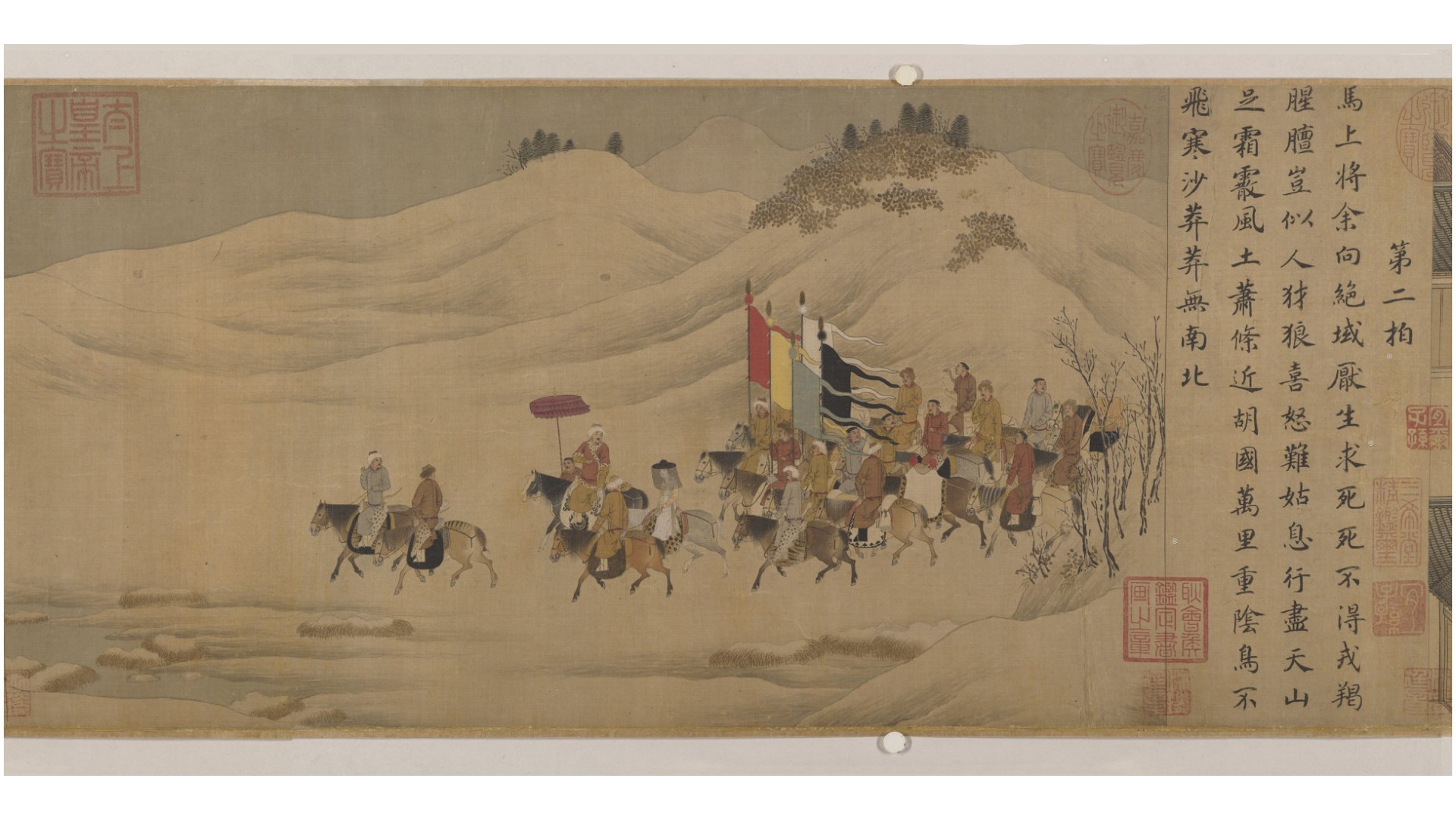
Cai Wenji's departure from China. Courtesy of the Metropolitan Museum of Art, New York.

Poet and composer Cai Yan (蔡琰), more commonly known by her courtesy name "Wenji", was the daughter of a prominent Eastern Han man of letters, Cai Yong. The family resided in Yu Prefecture, Chenliu Commandery, in what is now eastern Henan Province. Cai Wenji was born shortly before 178 CE and was married at the age of sixteen, according to the East Asian age reckoning (age fifteen in the Western reckoning), to Wei Zhongdao in 192 CE. Zhongdao died soon after the wedding, without any offspring. 194–195 CE brought Xiongnu nomads into the Chinese capital, and Cai Wenji was taken, along with other hostages, into the frontier. During her captivity, she became the wife of the Zuoxianwang ("Leftside Virtuous King" or "Wise King of the Left", possibly Liu Bao) and bore him two sons. It was not until twelve years later that Cao Cao, the Chancellor of Han, ransomed her in the name of her father, who had already died before her capture. When Cai Wenji returned to her homeland, she left her children behind in the frontier.

== Composition ==
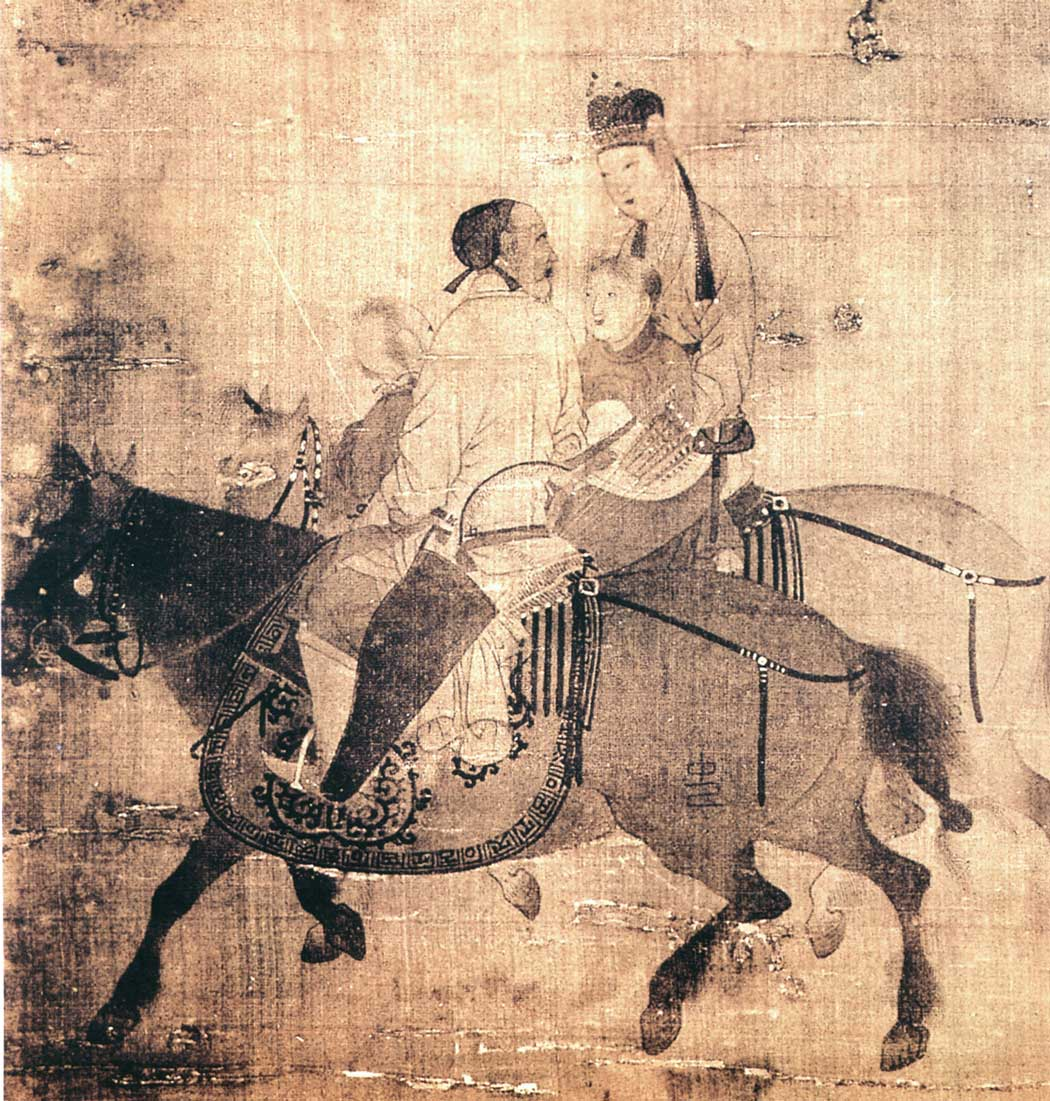
Anonymous painting of Cai Wenji and her Xiongnu husband (Zuoxianwang) dated from the Southern Song dynasty (文姬归汉图). They are riding their horses, each holding one of their sons. The expression on Wenji's face appears fulfilled, peaceful, and content, while the husband is turning his head back in farewell.

A number of poems have been written to immortalize Cai Wenji's life story, including her own. Liu Shang (c. 770 CE), wrote a poem about Wenji called Hujia Shiba Pai (胡笳十八拍; "Eighteen Songs on a Nomad Flute"). Liu Shang's poem, accompanied by 18 scenes painted on a handscroll, was commissioned by Emperor Gaozong of Song. Four fragments, presumed to be of the original, are housed in the Boston Museum of Fine Arts. The earliest complete copy, apparently from the fourteenth century and formerly in the C. C. Wang collection, resides in the Metropolitan Museum of Art in New York, which published it in 1974 in the book, Eighteen Songs of a Nomad Flute.

== Allegorical device ==
Chinese allegorical devices, as defined by German comparative scholar Erich Auerbach, are "something real and historical which announces something else that is also real and historical ... the relation between the two events is related by an accord or similarity". For example, there are obvious parallels between Cai Wenji's story and that of Gaozong's mother, the Empress Dowager Wei, who was captured along with the rest of the imperial clan and held hostage in the north. She was not released until a peace treaty was concluded between the Song dynasty and the Jurchens in 1142. Despite its allegorical development derived from Cai Wenji's story, her image today reverberates primarily with the feeling of sorrow.

== See also ==
- Chinese poetry
- Han poetry
- Guqin
- Music of China
- Tang poetry
