= Frula =

Musical instrument

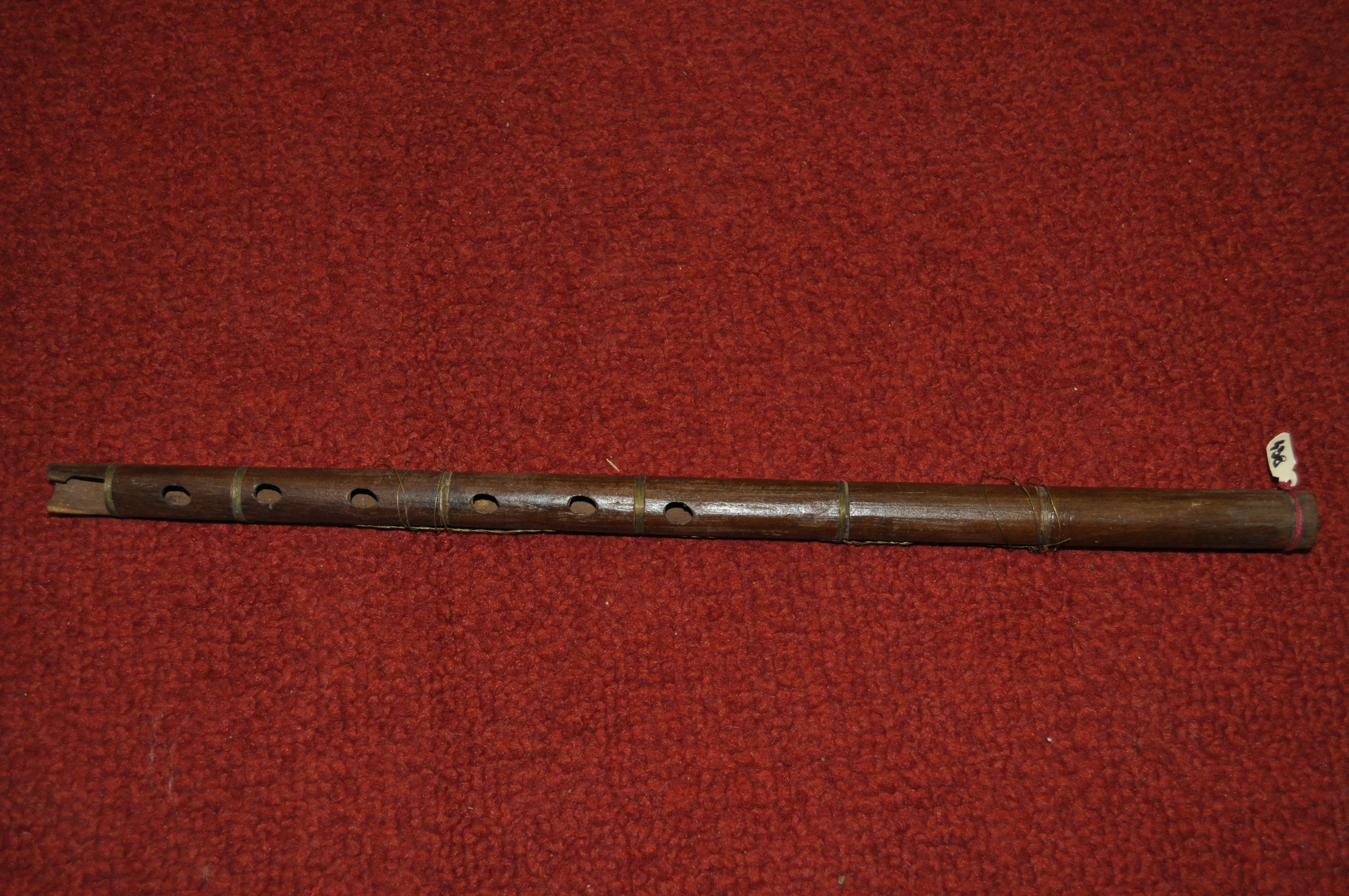
- A frula, in the collections of the Toplice National Museum, Prokuplje, Serbia.
- Classification: Woodwind; Wind; Aerophone

Related instruments
- see list

The frula (pronounced [frǔla], Serbian Cyrillic: фрула) or furulya (pronounced [ˈfuruɟɒ]), also known as svirala (свирала) or jedinka, is a musical instrument which resembles a medium sized flute, traditionally played in rural Southeastern Europe, or the rural Balkans, particularly in Bosnia and Herzegovina, Croatia, Serbia, and Hungary. It is an end-blown aerophone with six holes, typically made of wood. The frula is a traditional instrument of South Slavic shepherds, who would play while tending their flocks.

For a list of similar instruments, see the section below.

== Names ==
In Croatia, it is also commonly known as "jedinka". Other local names in Croatia include žveglica, šaltva, kavela, ćurlik. In English, the instrument has also simply been called the "Serbian flute". In Hungary, it is known as the furulya or pikula. Amongst the Csango Hungarians in eastern Romania, it is known as the szülü or sültü.

== Overview ==
The frula is a small wooden flute with six holes. In rural Southeast Europe, the frula was played by shepherds while tending their flocks. It is a traditional instrument of Serbia, one of several aerophones used for leisure time, rituals, or accompanying the kolo (circle dance), along with long flutes (duduk, cevara), the double flute (dvojnice), and the bag-pipe (gajde).

== Legacy ==
There are many events dedicated to the frula, such as the Prva pastirska frula in Jagnjilo, Dani Save Jeremića in Ražanj, sabori frulaša in Lelić and Prislonica, takmičenja frulaša in Iđoš, and Frula fest in Kruševac.

A popular Serbian folk song is Ej čija frula ("O, whose frula"), recorded by, among others, Braća Bajić, Radiša Urošević and Cune Gojković.

== Similar flutes ==
- shvi, Armenia
- sopilka, Ukraine
- lamzdeliai, Lithuania
- floghera, Greece
- fujarka, Poland
- kaval, Turkey
- balaban or duduk, double-reed, Armenia and Azerbaijan
