= Shvi =

Musical instrument

Woodwind instrument
- Other names: Tav shvi
- Classification: Woodwind; Wind; Aerophone

Related instruments
- Dilli Kaval

The shvi (Armenian: շվի, "whistle", pronounced sh-vee) is an Armenian fipple flute with a labium mouth piece. Commonly made of wood (apricot, boxwood, or ebony) or bamboo and up to 18 inches (460 mm) in length, it typically has a range of an octave and a-half. The tav shvi is made from apricot wood, it is up to 18 inches (460 mm) long, and is tuned a fourth lower producing a more lyrical and intimate sound.

The shvi is up to 12 inches in length and is made of reed, bark of willows, or walnut wood. It has 8 holes on the front, 7 of which are used while playing, and one thumbhole. One octave is obtained by blowing normally into the shvi and a second octave is attained by blowing with slightly more force (i.e., overblowing). The lower octave has a timbre similar to a recorder whereas the higher octave sounds similar to a piccolo or flute. 8-hole traditional flute. The shvi is played with the mouth. Typically, most Armenian duduk or zurna players learn the shvi before moving on to either instrument.

== See also ==
- Salamuri
- Dilli kaval
- Kaval (Blul)
- Duduk
- Sring
