= Culture of Mongolia =

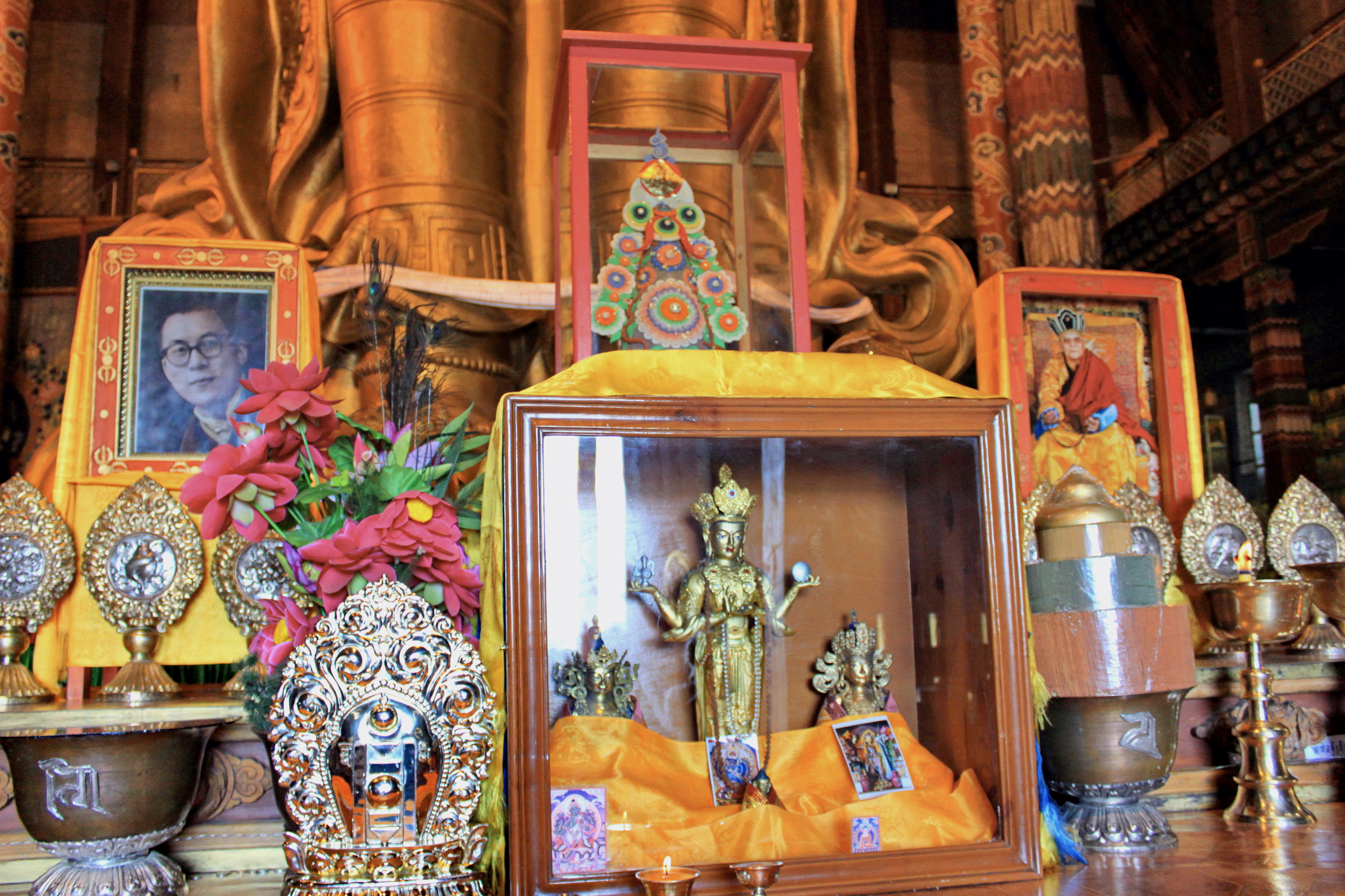
Altar of 9th Jebtsundamba Khutughtu - spiritual leader of the Gelug lineage among the Khalkha Mongols. Gandantegchinlen Monastery, Ulaanbaatar, Mongolia.

The culture of Mongolia has been shaped by the country's nomadic tradition and its position at the crossroads of various empires and civilizations. Mongolian culture is influenced by the cultures of the Mongolic, Turkic, and East Asian peoples, as well as by the country's geography and its history of political and economic interactions with other nations.

One of the most distinctive aspects of Mongolian culture is its nomadic pastoral economy, which has shaped the traditional way of life for the Mongols for centuries. The nomadic lifestyle is centered around the family and the community, and involves the herding of 5 main animals including sheep, goat, horse, cow, camel and some yaks. This way of life has had a significant impact on Mongolian culture, influencing everything from the country's social relationships and family structures to its art, music, and literature.

Mongolian culture is also well known for its traditional arts, which include music, dance, and literature. The country's music and dance traditions are closely connected to its nomadic past and are an important part of its cultural heritage. Mongolian literature, on the other hand, has a long and varied history, and includes both oral and written traditions.

Mongolian culture is also known for its distinctive architectural style, which reflects the country's nomadic tradition and its harsh weather during the winter months and rugged landscape. Mongolian homes, known as "Ger", are circular in shape and are constructed using a variety of materials including felt and wooden parts. The interior of a traditional Mongolian "ger" is portable and can be easily dismantled and reassembled, making them well-suited to the nomadic lifestyle.

In addition to its traditional architecture, Mongolian culture is also known for its handicrafts and folk art. Mongolian folk art includes a wide range of crafts and decorative arts, such as woodcarving, metalworking, embroidery, and weaving. These crafts are often passed down from generation to generation and are an important part of the country's cultural heritage. Mongolian handicrafts and folk art are often sold as souvenirs to tourists and are an important source of income for many Mongolian families.

Mongolian culture is also strongly influenced by its equestrian and wrestling traditions, which have played a central role in the country's history and continue to be an important part of its cultural identity today. In addition to these cultural traditions, Mongolia is home to a number of festivals and celebrations that reflect the country's rich cultural heritage, including the Naadam Festival and Tsagaan Sar, which is a national holidays that celebrates Mongolian culture and history.

== Material tradition ==
=== Clothing ===
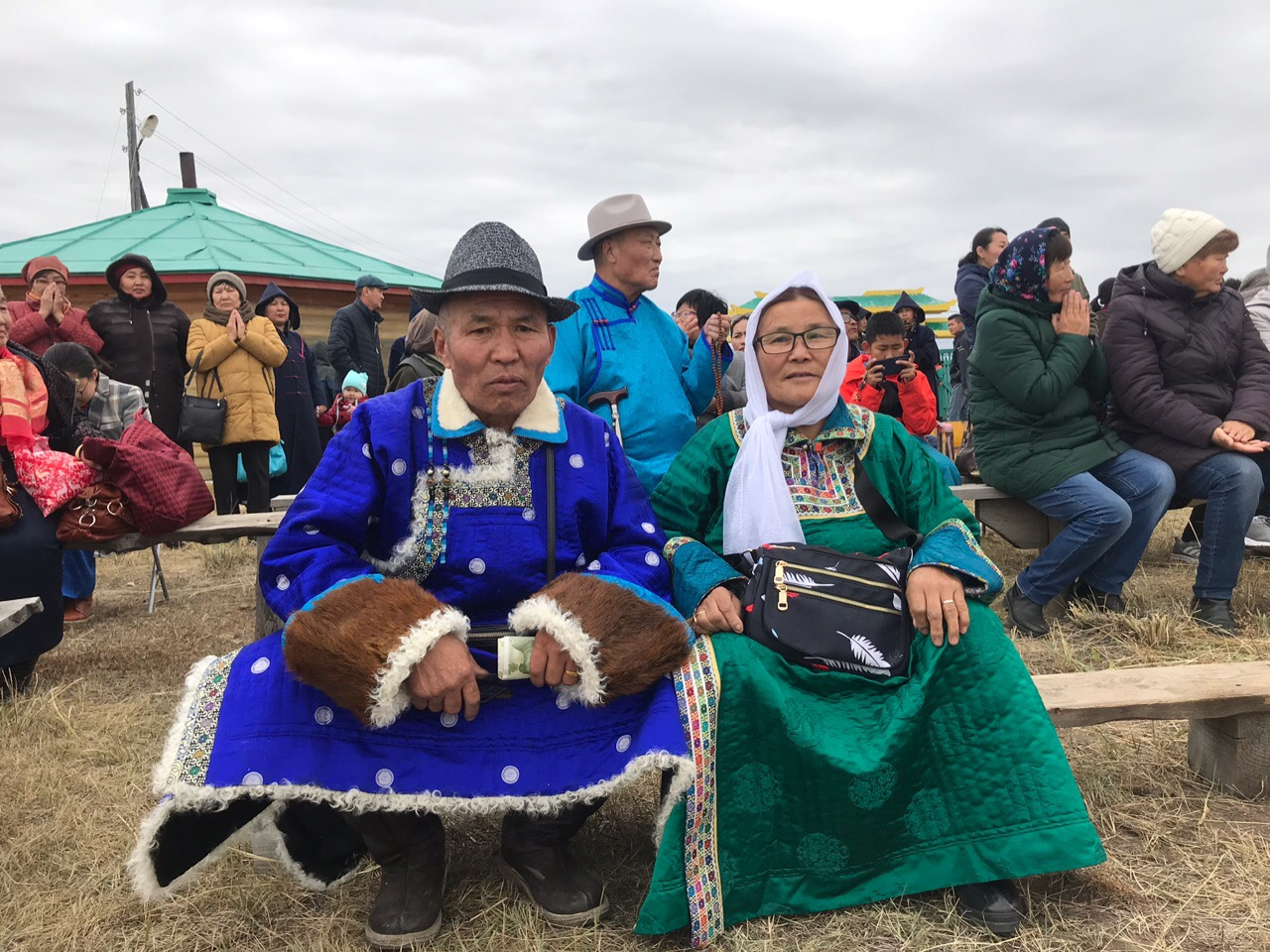
Üzemchin Mongols

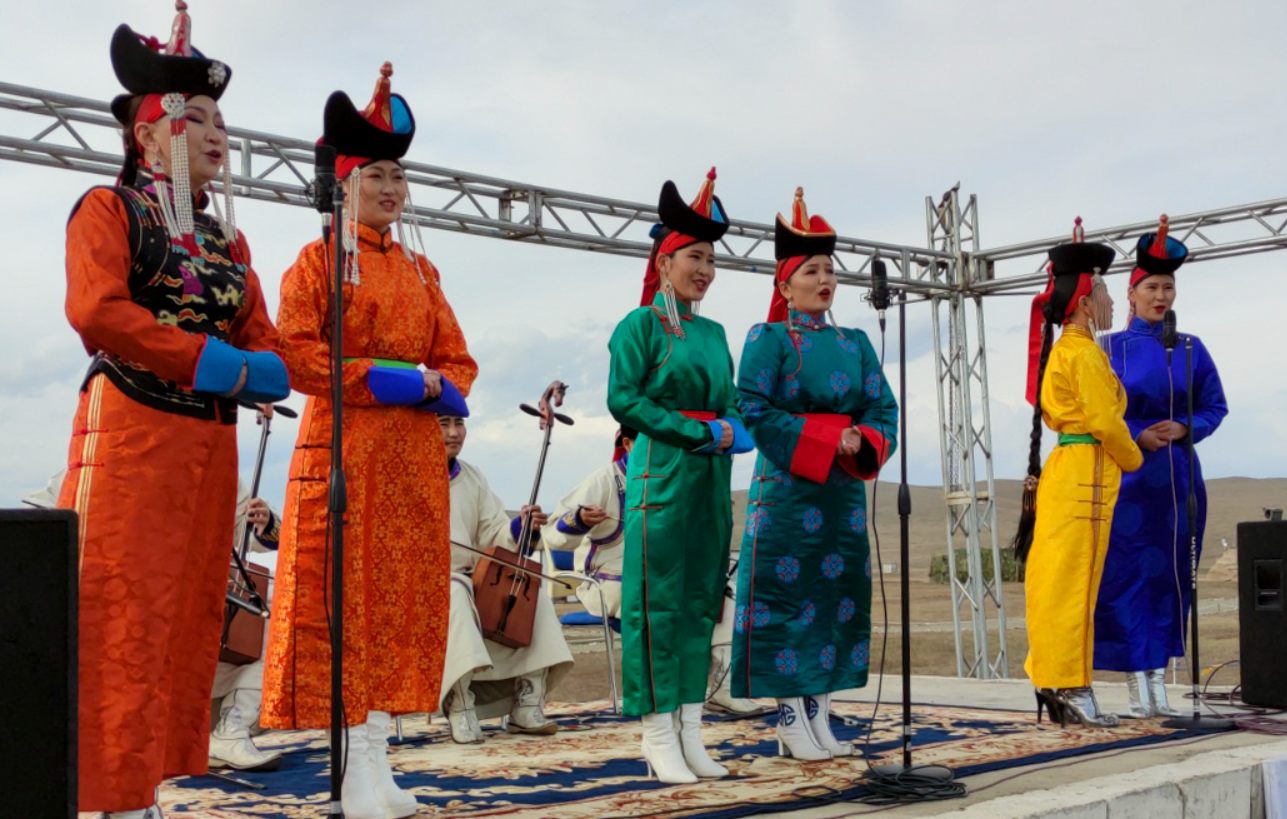
Mongolian artists in national costumes

Mongolian traditional clothing has changed little since the days of the empire because it is supremely well-adapted to the conditions of life on the steppe and the daily activities of pastoral nomads. However, there have been some changes in styles which distinguish modern Mongolian dress from historic costume. The deel, or kaftan, is the Mongolian traditional garment worn on workdays and special days. It is a long, loose gown cut in one piece with the sleeves; it has a high collar and widely overlaps at the front. The deel is girdled with a sash. Mongolian deels always close on the wearer's right and traditionally have five fastenings. Modern deels often have decoratively cut overflaps, small round necklines, and sometimes contain a Mandarin collar.

Depictions of Mongols during the time of the empire, however, show deels with more open necklines, no collars, and very simply cut overlaps, similar to the deels still worn by lamas in modern Mongolia. In addition to the deel, men and women might wear loose trousers beneath, and men may have worn skirts during the later Buddhist period, and women might wear underskirts, but in fact it appears on some Mongol paintings women wore wide trousers gathered at ankle, similar to shalwar or Turkish trousers. Skirts of the same style are still worn in part of Mongolia and China today; they have plain front and back panels with closely pleated side panels. Paintings of Mongols from Persian and Chinese sources depict men, and often women, wearing their hair in braids. The hair would be divided into two pigtails, each of which would be divided into three braids. The ends of the braids would then be looped up and bound to the top of the braid behind the ears. Men shaved the tops and sides of their heads, usually leaving only a short "forelock" in front and the long hair behind. The famous bogtag headdress worn by women seems to have been restricted to married women of very high rank.

Each ethnic group living in Mongolia has its own deel design distinguished by cut, color, and trimming. Before the revolution, all social strata in Mongolia had their own manner of dressing. Livestock breeders, for example, wore plain deels, which served them both summer and winter. The priests wore yellow deels with a cape or khimj thrown over it. Secular feudal lords put on smart hats and silk waistcoats.

=== Cuisine ===
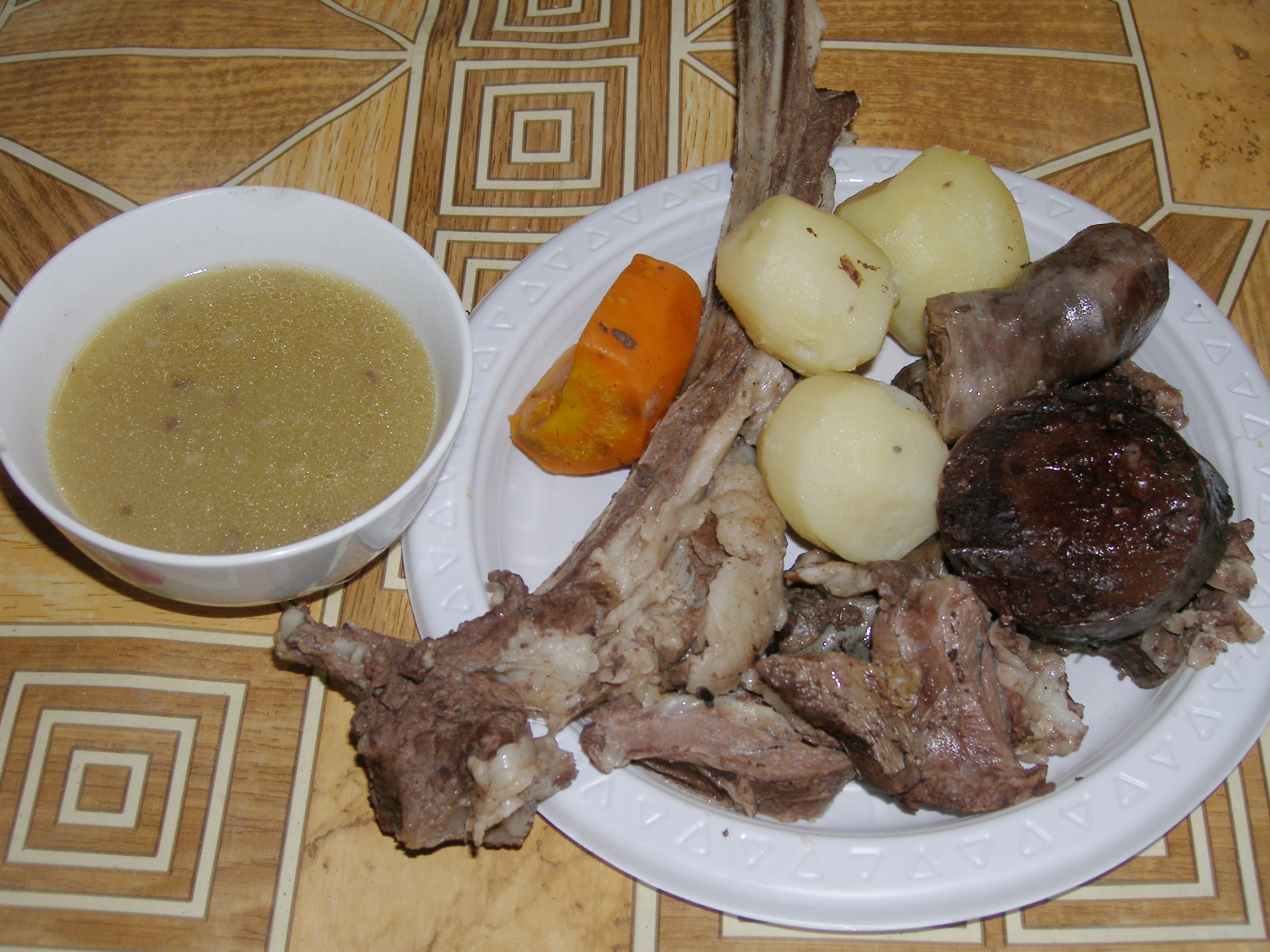
Khorkhog, a Mongolian meat stew, served as a special meal for guests.

Traditional Mongolian cuisine is primarily based on meat and dairies, with some regional variations. The most common meat local people consume is mutton, in the southern region local people also consume camel meat, and in the other parts mutton, beef, goat, horse and yak meat. Dairy products are made from mostly cow's milk and some from yak and goat including cheese, curds, creams and other dessert type dairies. There is also a traditional alcohol drink made from fermented mare's milk called (Airag). Popular dishes include buuz (meat dumpling), khuushuur (a meat pastry), khorkhog (a meat stew, usually a special meal for guests), and boortsog (a sweet biscuit). However, being a country wrapped in China and Russia for a long time, the current Mongolian cuisine has its evolution that adapted from both Chinese and Russian dishes that turned into Mongolian style including goulash (slow cooked meat with gravy and vegetables served with rice and mashed potato), tsuivan (stir fried noodle with meat, potatoes and carrots), various stir-fried dishes and soups with veggies and meat.

=== Cultural artifact controversy ===
On May 20, 2012, a rare skeleton of a Tarbosaurus bataar, also known as Tyrannosaurus bataar, was sold to an undisclosed buyer for $1,052,500 at an auction in New York City, United States, despite efforts by Mongolian President Elbegdorj Tsakhia to stop the sale. The Mongolian government is concerned about maintaining control over fossils and cultural relics while scientists worry about such items disappearing into private collections. A smuggler was convicted in a New York court in December 2012 for looting Tyrannosaurus bataar skeletons originating from Mongolia and transporting them to the United States for sale.

=== Ger (yurts) ===
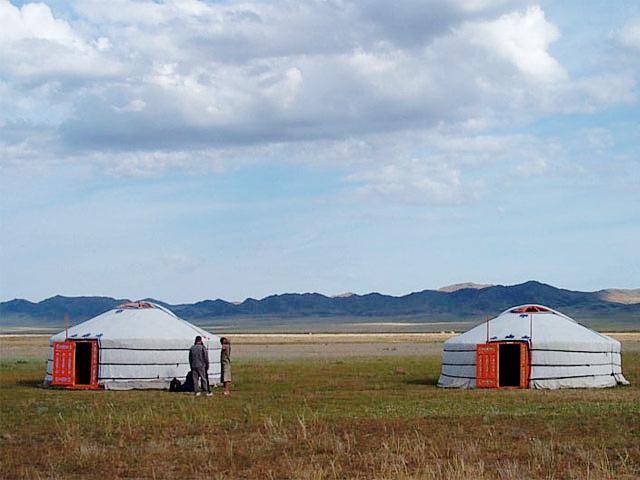
Yurts in the Mongolian countryside

The ger (yurts) is part of the Mongolian national identity. The Secret History of the Mongols mentions Genghis Khan as the leader of all people who live in felt tents, called gers, and even today a large share of Mongolia's population lives in ger, even in Ulaanbaatar. Ger also means "home" in a broad sense, and other words are derived from its word stem. For example, gerlekh is a verb that means ("to ger, to make a home" >) "to marry."

== Literary tradition ==
=== Traditional values ===
Among the topics that are mentioned from the oldest works of Mongolian literature to modern soft pop songs are love for mothers, parents and homesickness, a longing for the place where one grew up. Horses have always played an important role in daily life as well as in the arts. Mongolians have a lot of epic heroes from ancient times. Hospitality is so important in the steppes that it is traditionally taken for granted. Hospitality developed alongside Mongolia's nomadic pastoral way of life, where travelers arriving at a rural encampment were traditionally offered food, drink, and shelter as part of established social obligations.The Mongolian word for hero, baatar, appears frequently in personal names, and even in the name of Mongolia's capital, Ulaanbaatar, means "red hero" (Mongolian: Улаанбаатар, Ulan Bator). The word was introduced in the Middle Ages to many non-Mongolic languages by conquering Mongol-speaking nomads, and now exists in different forms such as the Bulgarian language, Russian, Polish, Hungarian, Persian, North Indian and Georgian. Traditional words such as temuuleh signified a way to describe creativity and passion; temuuleh was used in several Mongol words and had the meaning: "to rush headlong, to be inspired or to have a sense of creative thought, and even to take a flight of fancy." It can be seen from Mongolian perspective as "the look in the eye of a horse that is racing where it wants to go, no matter what the rider wants." The nomadic lifestyle also encouraged strong family cooperation and mutual support, as mobility and shared responsibilities were essential for survival on the Eurasian steppe.

=== Literature ===
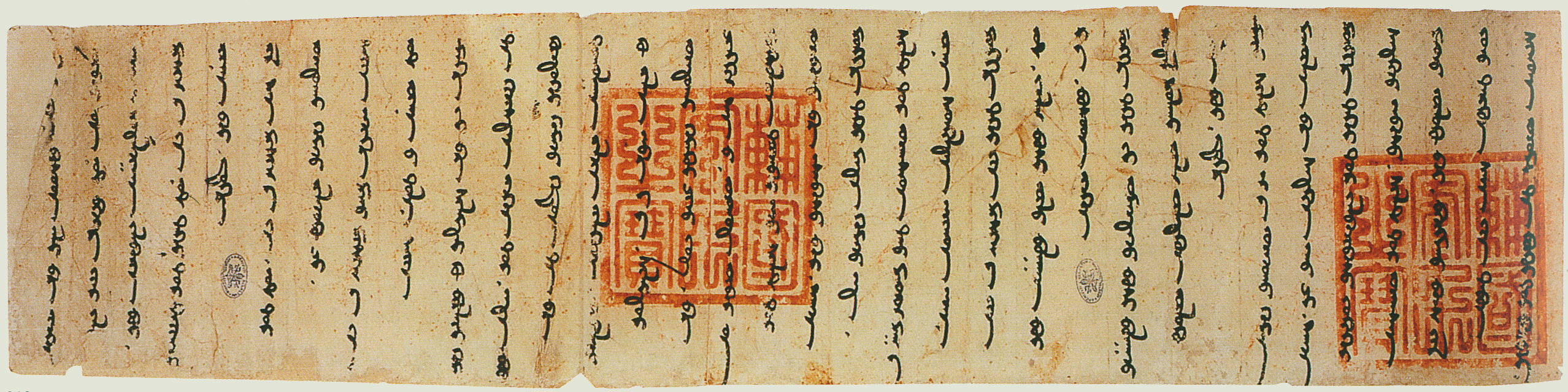
Letter from Arghun, Khan of the Mongol Ilkhanate, to Pope Nicholas IV, 1290

The oldest completely passed down work of Mongolian literature is probably also the most well-known abroad: The Secret History of the Mongols. It does, however, contain passages of older poetry. Otherwise, few examples of Mongolian literature from the time of the Mongol Empire have come down in written form: fragments of a song about the mother and the area where one grew up were found in a soldier's grave at the Volga river in 1930, 25 manuscript and block print fragments were found in Turpan in 1902/03, Pyotr Kozlov brought some fragments from Khara-Khoto in 1909.

Other pieces of literature have long been orally traded and typically consist of alliterative verses, and are known as Üligers, literally meaning tales. They include the proverbs attributed to Genghis Khan, and the epics around the Khan's life, or the one about his two white horses. Other well-known epics deal with Geser Khan. Famous Oirad epics are Jangar, Khan Kharangui, Bum Erdene, and more.

Beginning from the 17th century, a number of chronicles have been preserved. They also contain long alliterative passages. Notable examples are the Altan Tovch by Luvsandanzan and another anonymous work of the same title, Sagang Sechen's Erdeniin Tovch, Lomi's History of the Borjigin clan (Mongol Borjigin ovgiin tüükh), and many more.

Already at the time of the Mongol Empire, samples of Buddhist and Indian literature became known in Mongolia. Another wave of translations of Indian/Tibetan texts came with Mongolia's conversion to Tibetan Buddhism in the late 16th/ early 17th centuries. Beginning in the 1650s, copies of religious texts like the Kanjur and Tanjur and also of epics like Geser Khan began to appear as block prints. These prints were mainly produced in Beijing, but also in some Mongolian monasteries.

In Mongolia's time under the Qing dynasty, a number of Chinese novels were translated into Mongolian. At the same time, social discontent and an awakening Mongol nationalism lead to the creation of works like Injanash's historical novel Blue Chronicle or the stories about "Crazy" Shagdar.

Beginning with the works of Tseveen Jamsrano and other Buryats in the 1910s, many important works of Russian and European literature, or at least those that were not politically incorrect, were translated into Mongolian in the 20th century.

Religious theatre plays about the Tibetan hermit Milarepa were already performed in the 18th and 19th centuries. The oldest Mongolian drama known today, "Moon Cuckoo" (Saran khökhöö) was created by Danzanravjaa around 1831. The play got lost in the early 20th century, but in the meantime other theatre groups had developed. The first professional Mongolian theatre was founded in Ulaanbaatar in 1930. In the socialist period, every aimag got its own theatre. Since the 1990s, a number of small privately owned theatre companies, like Mask or Shine üe prodakshn have been founded. They heavily focus on light comedies and skits, and also regularly produce clips that are distributed on DVD or the internet.

=== Oral traditions and oral literature ===
The spoken storytelling traditions that led to Mongolian literature include "heroic epics, legends, tales, yörööl (the poetry of good wishes), and magtaal (the poetry of praise)".

== Fine arts ==
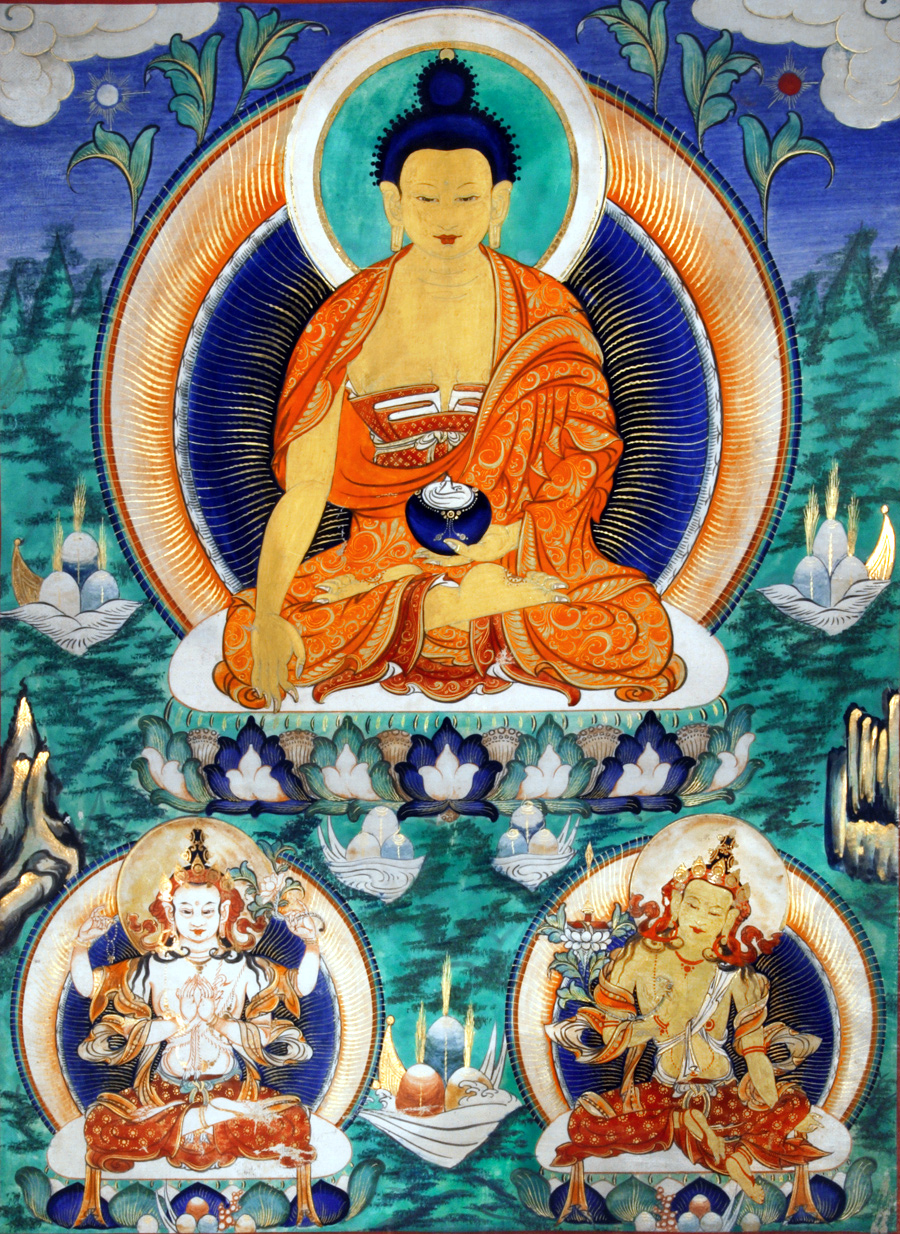
19th Century Mongolian distemper

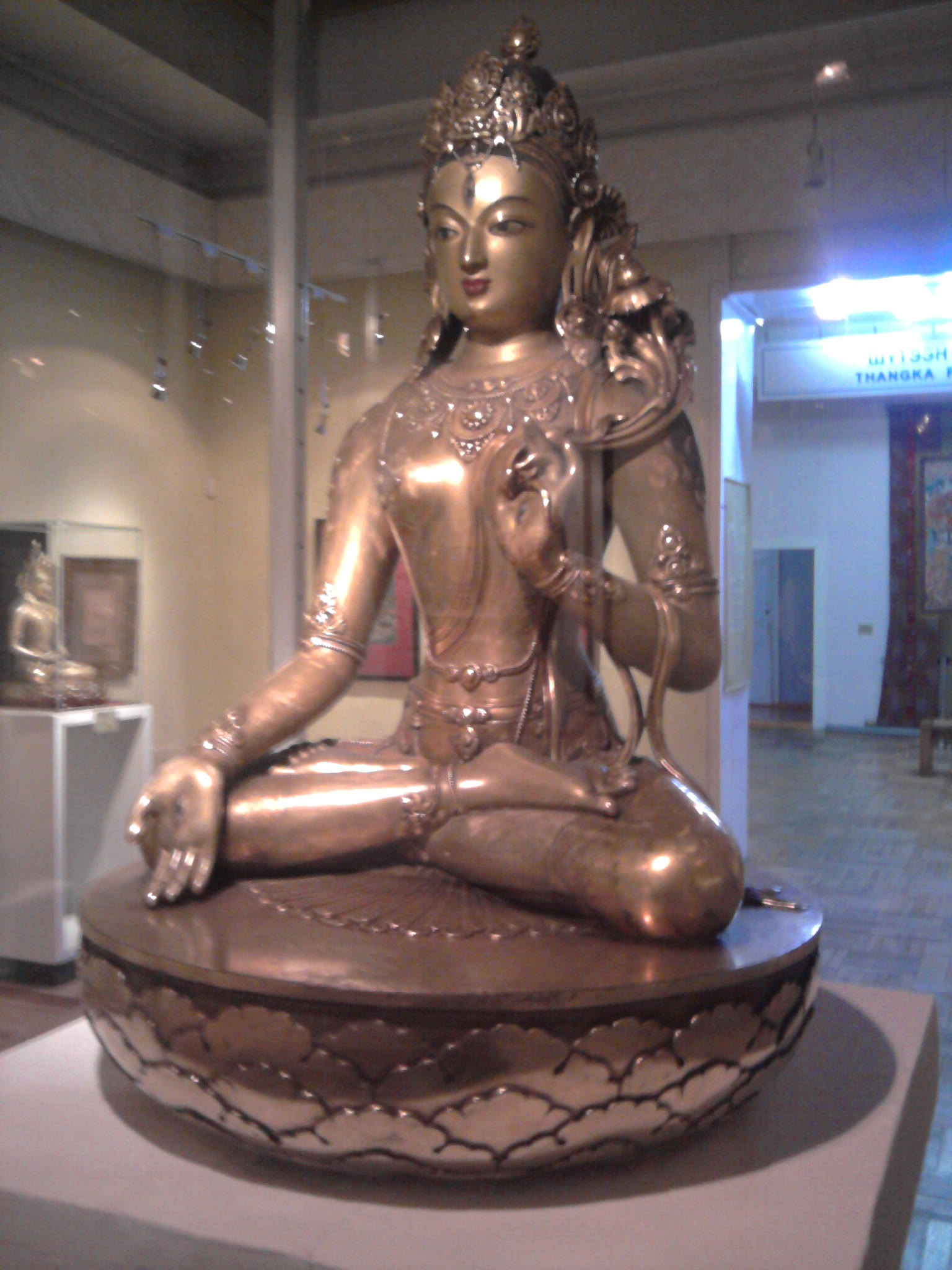
Sita (White) Tara by Öndör Gegeen Zanabazar. Mongolia, 17th century

Before the 20th century, most works of the fine arts in Mongolia had a religious function, and therefore Mongolian fine arts were heavily influenced by religious texts. Thangkas were usually painted or made in applique technique. Bronze sculptures usually showed Buddhist deities. A number of great works are attributed to the first Jebtsundamba Khutuktu, Zanabazar.

In the late 19th century, painters like "Marzan" Sharav turned to more realistic painting styles. Under the Mongolian People's Republic, socialist realism was the dominant painting style, however traditional thangka-like paintings dealing with secular, nationalist themes were also popular, a genre known as "Mongol zurag".

Among the first attempts to introduce modernism into the fine arts of Mongolia was the painting Ehiin setgel (Mother's love) created by Tsevegjav in the 1960s. The artist was purged as his work was censored.

All forms of fine arts flourished only after "Perestroika" in the late 1980s. Otgonbayar Ershuu is an important painter of the time, he was portrayed in the film "ZURAG" by Tobias Wulff.

== Religion ==
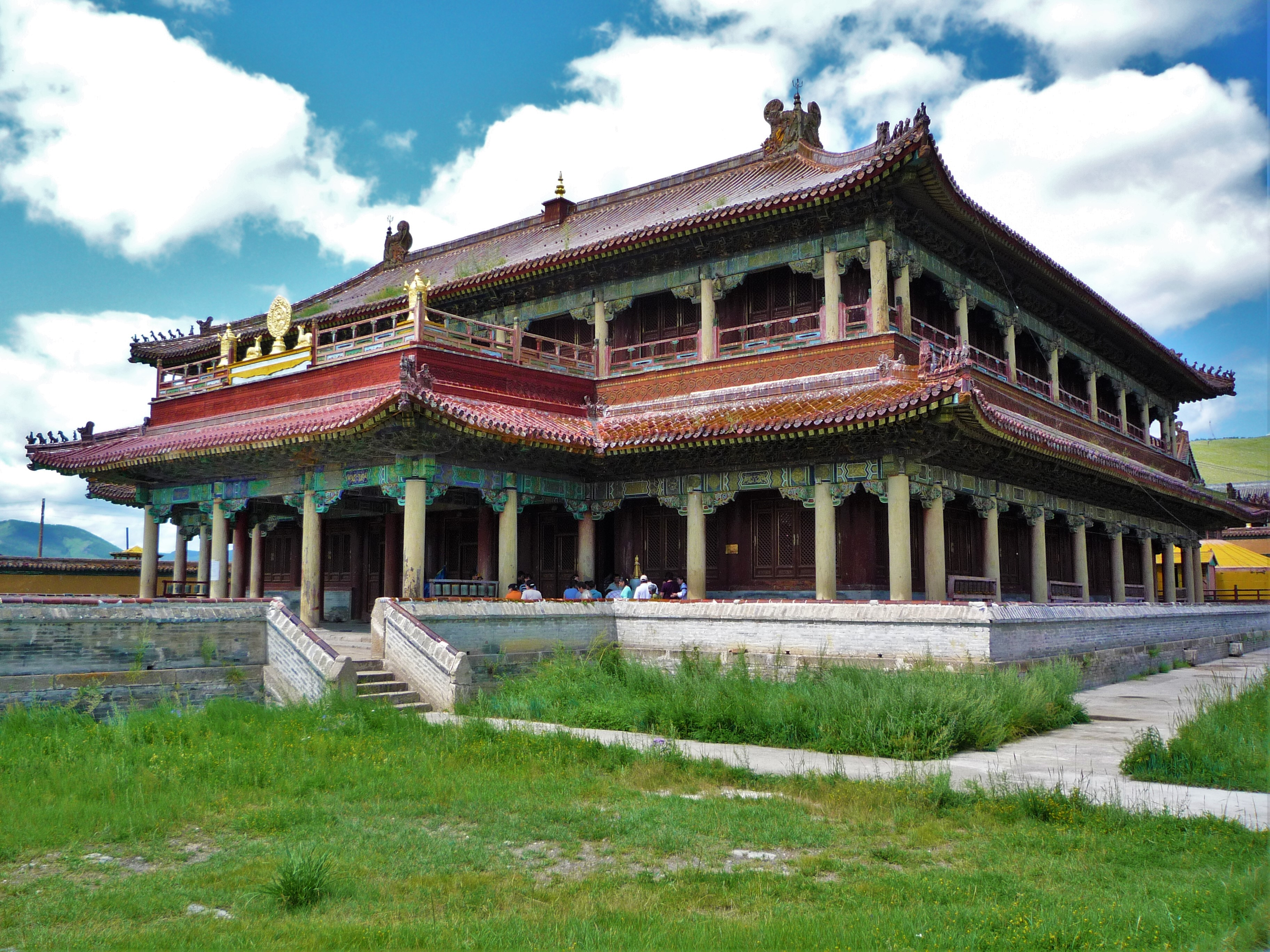
A Buddhist monastery in Mongolia

Religion	2010		2020	
Religion	Number	%	Number	%
Buddhism	1,459,983	53.0	1,704,480	51.7
Islam	82,641	3.0	105,500	3.2
Mongolian shamanism	79,886	2.9	82,422	2.5
Christianity	60,603	2.2	42,859	1.3
Other religion	11,019	0.4	23,078	0.7
Non-religious	1,063,308	38.6	1,338,528	40.6
Total population	2,754,685	100	3,296,866	100

Since ancient times Tengrism and Shamanism have been the dominant belief systems of the Mongols and still retain significant importance in their mythology. During the era of the Great Khans, Mongolia practiced freedom of worship which is still a defining element of the Mongol character. In the 17th century, Tibetan Buddhism became the dominant religion in Mongolia. Traditional Shamanism was, except in some remote regions, suppressed and marginalized. On the other hand, a number of shamanic practices, like ovoo worshiping, were incorporated into Buddhist liturgy.

Tibetan Buddhism is a ritualistic religion with a large number of deities. This inspired the creation of religious objects including images in paintings and sculptures.

After the Stalinist purges in the 1930s, both Buddhism and Shamanism were virtually outlawed in the Mongolian People's Republic. In Inner Mongolia, traditional religion was heavily affected by the Cultural Revolution. Since the 1990s, a number of Christian sects are trying to gain a foothold in Mongolia. About 4% of the Mongolian population is Muslim.

== Customs and superstitions ==
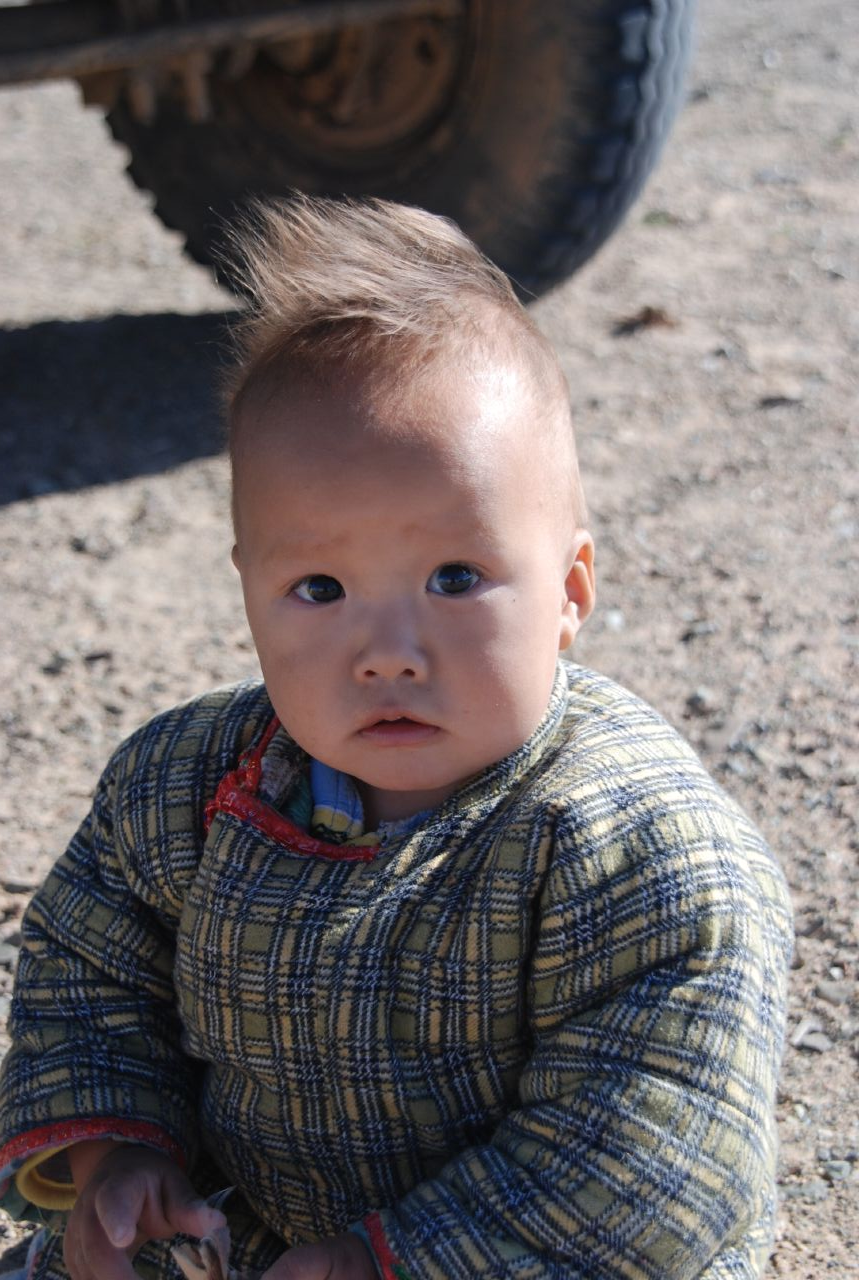
Mongolian baby

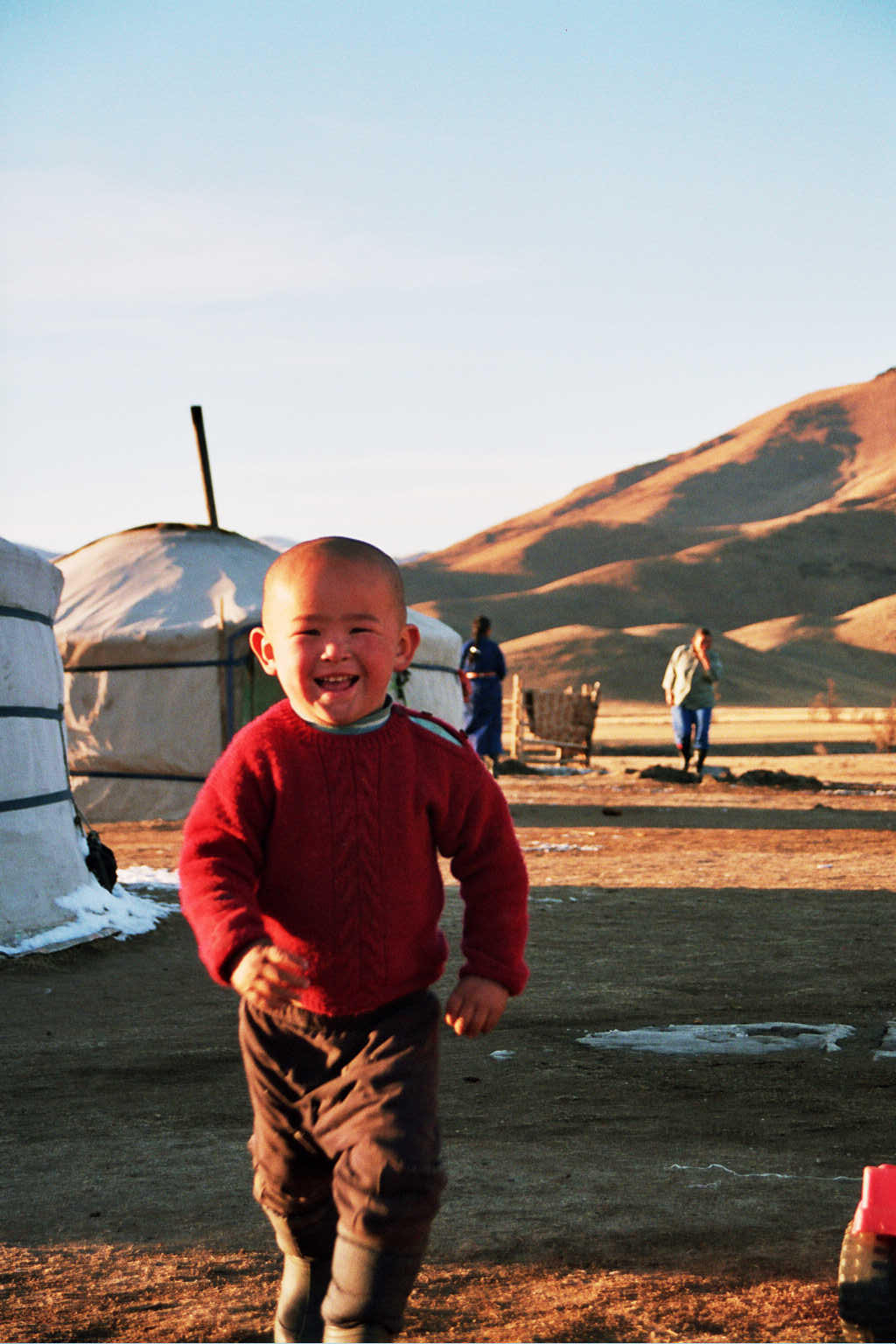
Mongolian child

Mongolians traditionally were afraid of misfortunes and believe in good and evil omens. Misfortune might be attracted by talking about negative things or by persons that are often talked about. They might also be sent by some malicious shaman enraged by breaking some taboo, like stepping on a yurt's threshold, desecrating waters or mountains, etc.

The most endangered family members were children. They are sometimes given non-names like Nergui (Mongolian: without name) or Enebish (Mongolian: not this one), or boys would be dressed up as girls. "Since people of the steppe received only one name in life, its selection carried much symbolism, often on several levels; the name imparted to the child its character, fate and destiny." Before going out at night, young children's foreheads are sometimes painted with charcoal or soot to deceive evil spirits that this is not a child but a rabbit with black hair on the forehead.

When passing ovoos (cairns) on a journey, they are often circumambulated and sweets or the like are sacrificed to have a safe trip. Certain ovoos, especially those on high mountains, are sacrificed to obtain good weather, ward off misfortune, and the like.

For a child, the first big celebration is the first haircut, usually at an age between three and five. Birthdays were not celebrated in the past, but today, birthday parties are popular. Wedding ceremonies traditionally include the hand-over of a new yurt (ger) to the marrying couple. Deceased relatives were usually put to rest in the open, where the bodies were eaten by animals and birds. Nowadays, bodies are usually buried.

== Festivities ==
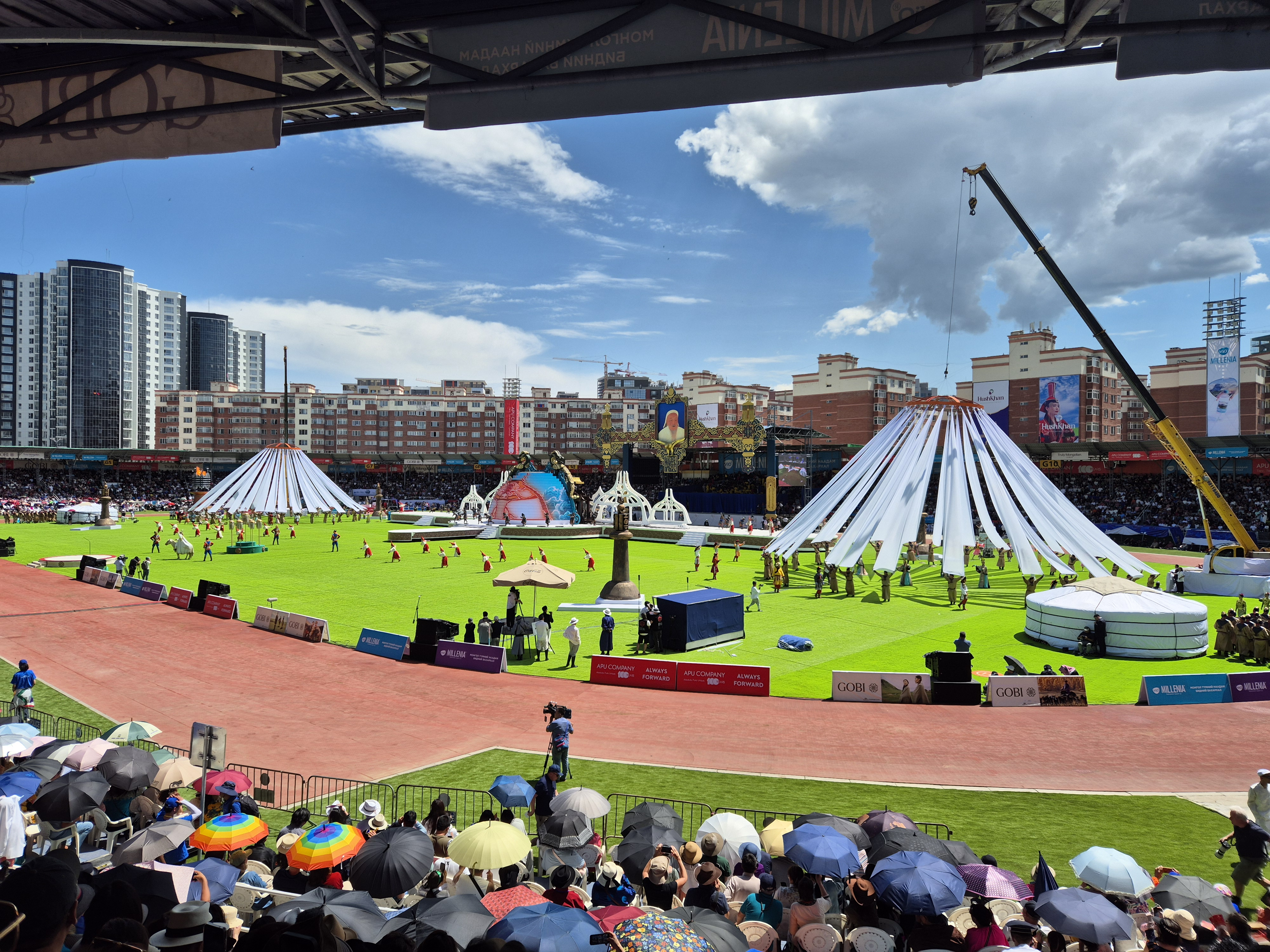
Naadam Festival in Ulaanbaatar

The most important public festivals are the Naadam (English: game). The biggest one is held each year on July 11–13 in Ulaanbaatar, but there are also smaller ones on aimag and sum levels. A Naadam involves horse racing, wrestling, and archery competitions.

For families, the most important festival is Tsagaan Sar (English: white month/Lunar New Year), which is roughly equivalent to the Chinese New Year, but has nothing similar to Chinese New Year, and usually falls into January or February. Family members and friends visit each other, exchange presents - very popular presents for all opportunities are the khadag - and eat huge quantities of buuz.

Under the Soviet influence, New Year became a big holiday, and it is one of the biggest celebrations, comparable to Christmas in the West.

== Entertainment ==
=== Music ===
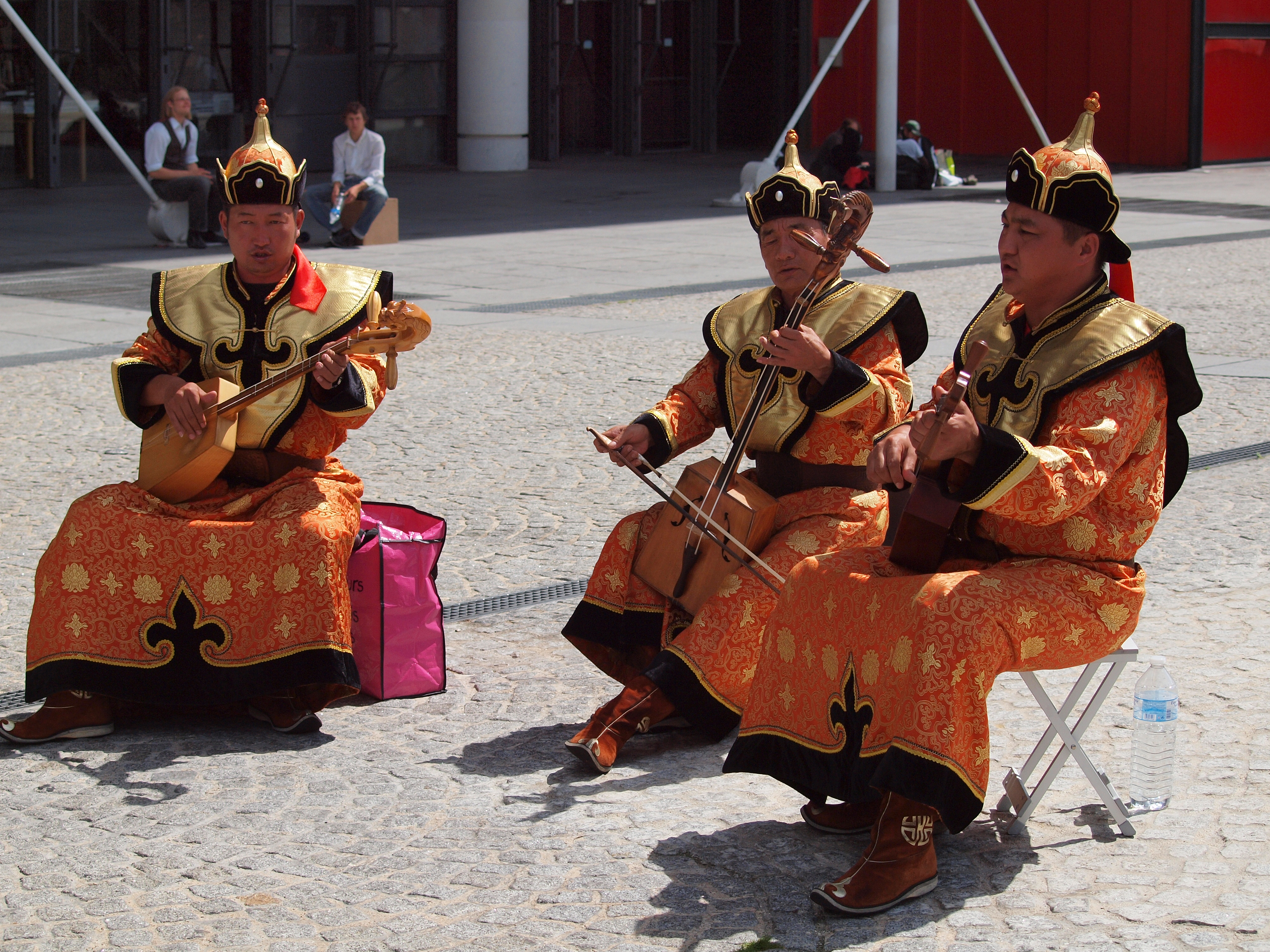
Mongolian musicians playing outside the Centre Pompidou in Paris, France.

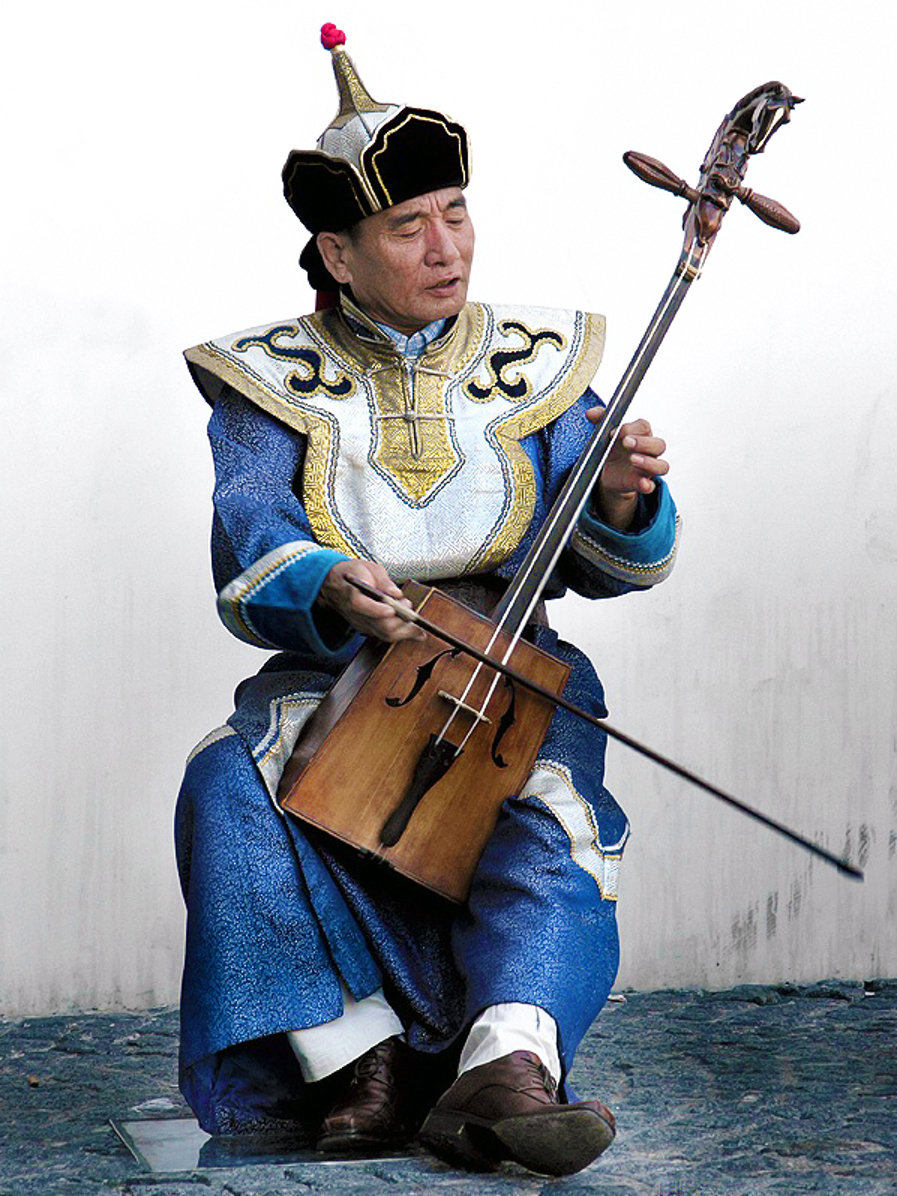
Morinhuur: Mongolian Horsehead Fiddle

Mongolia has a very old musical tradition. Key traditional elements are throat-singing, the Morin Khuur (horse headed fiddle) and other string instruments, and several types of songs. Mongolian melodies are typically characterized by pentatonic harmonies and long end notes.

In the 20th century, western style classical music has been introduced, and mixed with traditional elements by some composers. Later on the full palette of Pop and Rock music has also been adopted by younger musicians.

The Mongolian Waltz is a dance unique to Mongolia. Typically, one mounted horseman and one mounted horsewoman circle each other in time to a traditional song, which speeds up as it progresses. The three step gait of the horses, as they circle, gives the dance its name.

=== Cinema ===
In socialist times, movies were treated as a propaganda instrument by the Mongolian People's Revolutionary Party. The first topics were popular legends and revolutionary heroes like in Sükhbaatar. In the 1950s, the focus shifted to working class heroes, as in New Year. The 1970s saw many documentaries and everyday life stories as in The Clear Tamir.

After democratization, film makers turned to international partners for support, as in the Japanese-Mongolian co-production Genghis Khan. Independent directors like Dorjkhandyn Turmunkh and Byambasuren Davaa created movies that connected ancient traditions and mythology, and how they may relate to life in a modern world. Byambasuren's The Story of the Weeping Camel was nominated for an Academy Award as foreign documentary in 2005.

=== Games ===
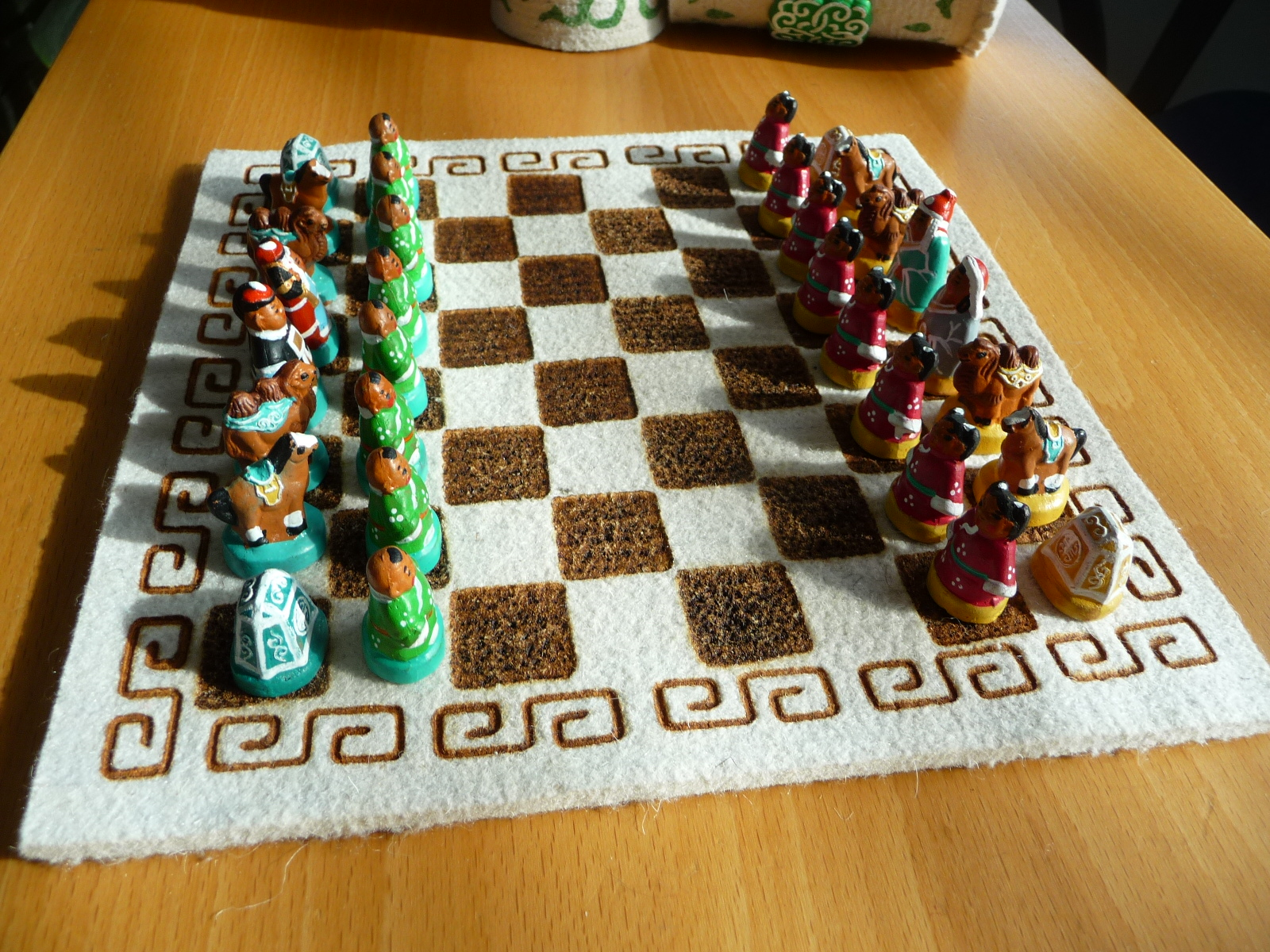
Mongolian shatar, variant of chess

Popular board games are chess and checkers. The chess figures are noyon (noble = king), bers (cp. bars "tiger" = queen), temee (camel = bishop), mori (horse = knight), tereg (cart = castle), khüü (boy = pawn). The rules used today are the same as in European chess, although there are differing versions called 'Mongolian Chess' (shatar) and 'Daur Chess'.

Dominoes are played widely. Indigenous card games existed in the 19th century but are now lost. One of the popular card games that is played is Muushig and various other modern card games are very popular among the younger generations such as 13 (similar to poker).

Sheep anklebones, or shagai, are used in games, as dice or as token. Not only they use anklebones as a token, but also they have number of games only using “shagai” itself. Rock, paper, scissors and morra-like games are also played. Wood knots and disentanglement puzzles have traditionally been popular.

Mongolian children were known to have played an ice game on frozen rivers that is similar to curling.

== List of Mongolian Intangible Cultural Heritage ==
Element^{[A]}	Year Proclaimed^{[B]}	Year Inscribed^{[C]}	Region^{[D]}	Reference
The Traditional Music of the Morin Khuur	2003	2008		
Urtiin Duu - Traditional Folk Long Song	2005	2008		
Biyelgee dance		2009		
Traditional epic poem		2009		
Tsuur end-blown flute		2009	2008	
The Traditional Naadam festival	2010	2010		
Falconry, a living human heritage		2012		
Mongolian throat singing		2010		
Folk long song performance technique of Limbe (flute) performances - circular breathing		2011		
Mongolian calligraphy		2013		
Traditional craftsmanship of the Mongol Ger and its associated customs		2013		
Mongolian knuckle-bone shooting		2014		
Coaxing ritual for camel		2015		

== See also ==
- History of Mongolia
- Architecture of Mongolia
- Mongolian alphabets
- List of historical cities and towns of Mongolia
- Long-song
- Biyelgee
- Soyombo symbol
- Flag of Mongolia
- Emblem of Mongolia
- Mongolian mythology
- Traditional Mongolian medicine
- List of museums in Mongolia
- List of World Heritage Sites in Northern and Central Asia
- List of World Heritage Sites in Eastern Asia
- Society of the Mongol Empire
- Mongolian name
- Surnames by country § Mongolia
- Nomadic pastoralism
- List of nomadic peoples
- Goyol Fashion Festival
