= BLL =

BLL may refer to:

== Places ==
- Bardon Mill railway station (station code BLL), Bardon Mill, Northumberland, England, UK
- Billund Airport (IATA airport code BLL)
- Bloemendaal railway station (station code Bll); see Railway stations in the Netherlands

== Groups, companies, organizations ==
- Ball Corporation (NYSE ticker symbol BLL)
- Baltic Airlines (ICAO airline code BLL); see List of airline codes (B)
- Box Lacrosse League

== Other uses ==
- Bachelor of Laws (B.LL)
- Blood lead level
- Business logic layer

== See also ==
- BII (disambiguation)
- B11 (disambiguation)
- BL2 (disambiguation)
- BL (disambiguation)
