= BXI =

BXI may refer to:

- Boundiali Airport (IATA airport code BXI), Boundiali, Côte d'Ivoire
- Brussels Airlines (ICAO airline code BXI); see List of airline codes (B)
- Diyari language (ISO 639 language code bxi)
- BXI (EP), by the Japanese band Boris and The Cult lead vocalist Ian Astbury
- B11 (disambiguation) (Roman numerals: XI)

== See also ==
- Bx1, bus route, New York City, US
- BXL (disambiguation)
