= BII =

BII, Bii, bii, may refer to:

== Places ==
- Bikini Atoll Airport, Marshall Islands (IATA code: BII)
- U1 (Berlin U-Bahn), formerly B^{II}

== People ==
- Bii (singer) (born 1989), Taiwanese singer

== Groups, organizations, companies ==
- Bank Internasional Indonesia, former name of Bank Maybank Indonesia
- Basel Institute for Immunology
- Birds International Incorporated
- British Institute of Innkeeping
- British International Investment, a development finance institution of the UK government (formerly CDC Group plc, Commonwealth Development Corporation, and Colonial Development Corporation)

== Other uses ==
- Business interoperability interface, interface that enables business interoperability between organisational systems
- Bisu language (ISO 639: bii), Loloish language spoken in Thailand
- Biyelgee, also called bii, Mongolian dance
- Breast implant illness, breast implant related illness

== See also ==
- B2 (disambiguation), including a list of topics named B.II, etc.
- BLL (disambiguation)
- B11 (disambiguation)
