= 11B =

11B may refer to:

- WASP-11b, an extrasolar planet discovered in 2008
- GCR Class 11B, a class of British 4-4-0 steam locomotive
- Ontario Highway 11B
- New Hampshire Route 11B
- New York State Route 11B
- 802.11b, an IEEE standard for wireless networking
- Boron-11 (^{11}B), an isotope of boron
- The U.S. Army Military Occupational Specialty code for an enlisted infantry soldier – phonetically pronounced "Eleven Bravo"
- U.S. Federal Rule of Civil Procedure 11(b), providing for sanctions against attorneys who bring frivolous lawsuits

== See also ==
- 11B-X-1371, an Internet viral video
- Stalag XI-B, a German Army POW camp near Fallingbostel
- B11 (disambiguation)
