= BXL =

BXL may refer to:

== Places ==
- Brussels (common shorthand of its French name Bruxelles)
- Bheduasole railway station (station code BXL), Bhanga Bandh, Beliara, Bheduasole, Bankura, West Bengal, India
- Blue Lagoon Seaplane Base (IATA airport code BXL), Nanuya Lailai, Fiji; see List of airports by IATA airport code: B

== Groups, organizations, companies ==
- Belarusian Extraleague, the top ice hockey league in Belarus
- Bonair Express (ICAO airline code BXL)
- Air Exel Belgique (ICAO airline code BXL), see List of defunct airlines of Belgium
- ICAO airline code BXL, used by several airlines successively, see List of defunct airlines of the Netherlands Antilles

== Other uses ==
- Jeri language (ISO 639 language code bxl)

== See also ==
- bx1
- BXI (disambiguation)
