= B11 =

B11, B.XI or B-11 may refer to:

== Transportation ==
- B11 (New York City bus) serving Brooklyn
- Bundesstraße 11, federal highway in Germany

=== Vehicles ===
- HMS B11, a B-class submarine of the British Royal Navy
- Bavarian B XI, an 1895 German steam locomotive model
- Bensen B-11, a Bensen Aircraft model
- Douglas YB-11, a bomber designed for the United States Army Air Corps
- Nissan B11, a version of the Nissan Sunny
- Volvo B11R, a coach bus chassis manufactured by Volvo since 2011

== Other uses ==
- B-11 recoilless rifle, a Soviet 107 mm weapon
- Gareth Bale, a professional footballer from Wales
- Boron-11 (B-11 or ^{11}B), an isotope of boron
- Caro–Kann Defence, Encyclopaedia of Chess Openings code B11

== See also ==
- 11B (disambiguation)
- B1 (disambiguation)
- BII (disambiguation)
- BLL (disambiguation)
- BXI (disambiguation)
