= Boundiali Airport =

Airport in Ivory Coast

- IATA: BXI; ICAO: DIBI

Summary
- Airport type: Public
- Serves: Boundiali
- Elevation AMSL: 1,286 ft / 392 m
- Coordinates: 9°32′30″N 6°28′20″W

Map

Runways
Direction	Length		Surface
Direction	ft	m	Surface
15/33	5,115	1,560	Unpaved
- Source: Google Maps

Boundiali Tehini Airport (IATA: BXI, ICAO: DIBI) is an airport serving Boundiali, Côte d'Ivoire.

== See also ==
- Transport in Côte d'Ivoire
