= BL2 =

BL2 could refer to:

- BL2, a postcode district in the BL postcode area
- Biosafety Level 2
- The EMD BL2 locomotive
- Borderlands 2, a space Western role-playing game
