= Mongolian calligraphy =

Calligraphy technique of the classical Mongolian script

The Imperial Seal of the Mongols using the classical Mongolian script, as found in a letter Güyük Khan sent to the Roman Pope Innocent IV.

Mongolian calligraphy is a form of calligraphy or artistic writing of the Mongolian language.

Although Mongolia uses the Cyrillic script which was adopted during the Communist era, Mongolian calligraphy is written in the traditional Mongolian script. In 2013, Mongolian calligraphy was inscribed on the UNESCO List of Intangible Cultural Heritage in Need of Urgent Safeguarding. In 2014, China inscribed Mongolian calligraphy on the fourth batch of the national list of intangible cultural heritage.

At present, only three middle-aged scholars voluntarily train the small community of just over twenty young calligraphers. Traditionally, mentors select the best students and train them to be calligraphers over a period of five to eight years. Students and teachers bond for life and continue to stimulate each other’s artistic endeavours. The rate of social transformation, urbanization and globalization have led to a significant drop in the number of young calligraphers.

== Implements ==
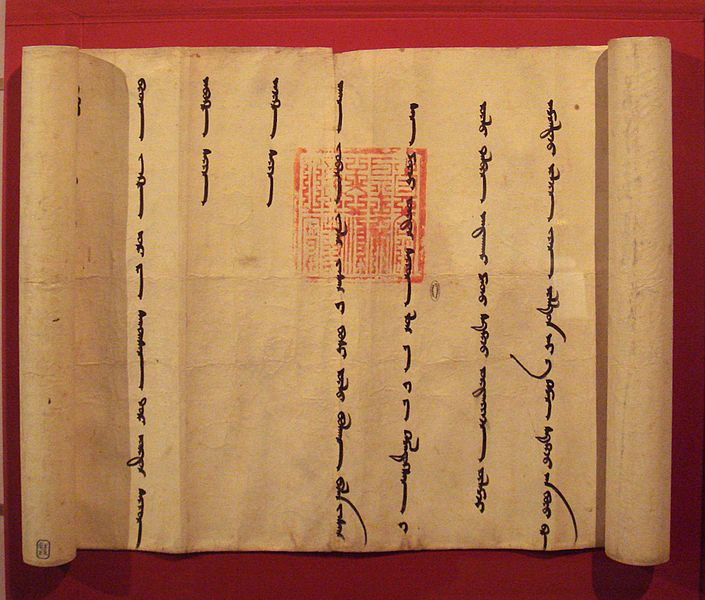

The reed pen was the writing instrument of choice until the 18th century, when the brush took its place under Chinese influence. Pens were also historically made of wood, reed, bamboo, bone, bronze, or iron. Ink used was black or cinnabar red, and written with on birch bark, paper, cloths made of silk or cotton, and wooden or silver plates.

Gallery

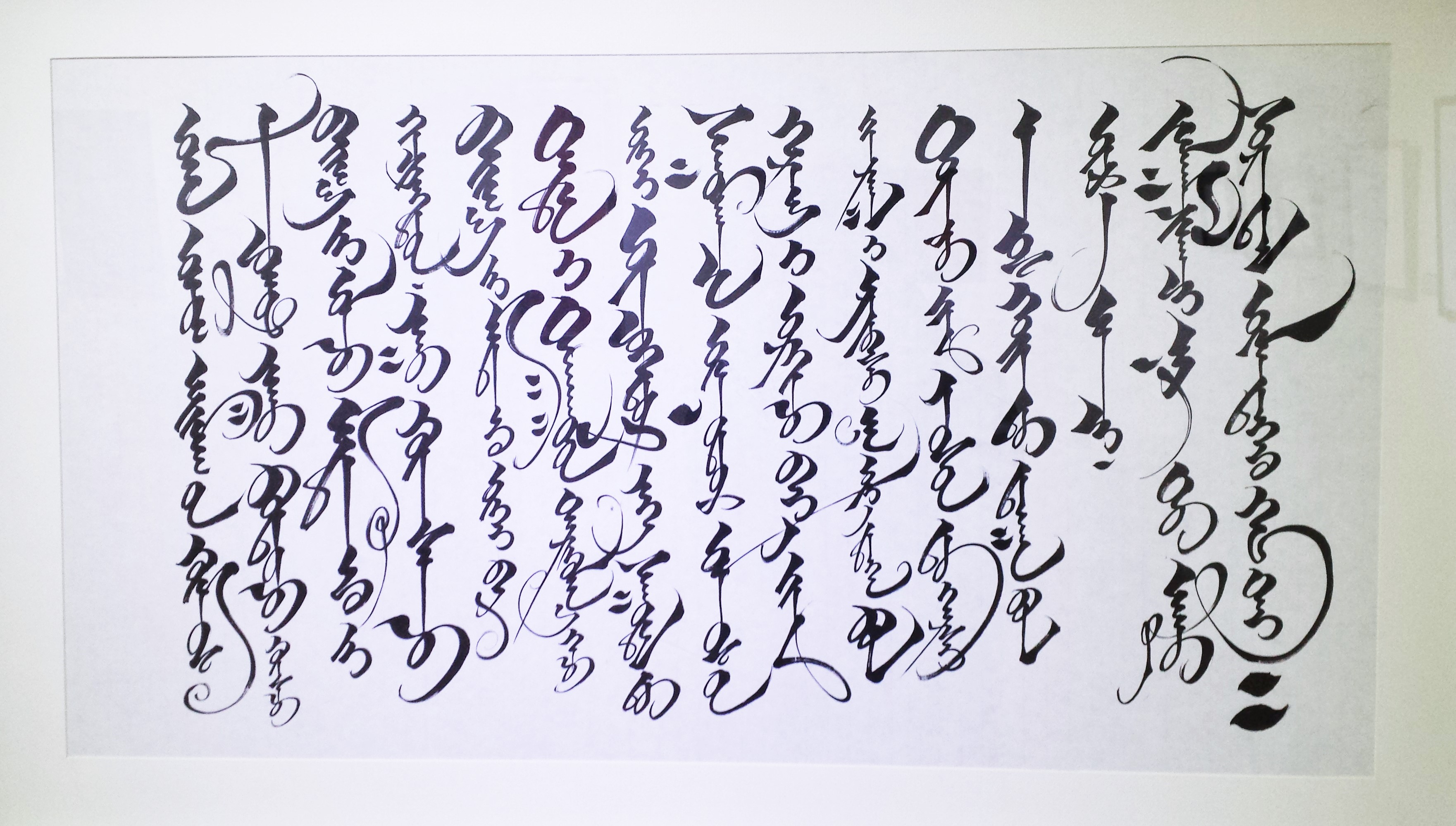

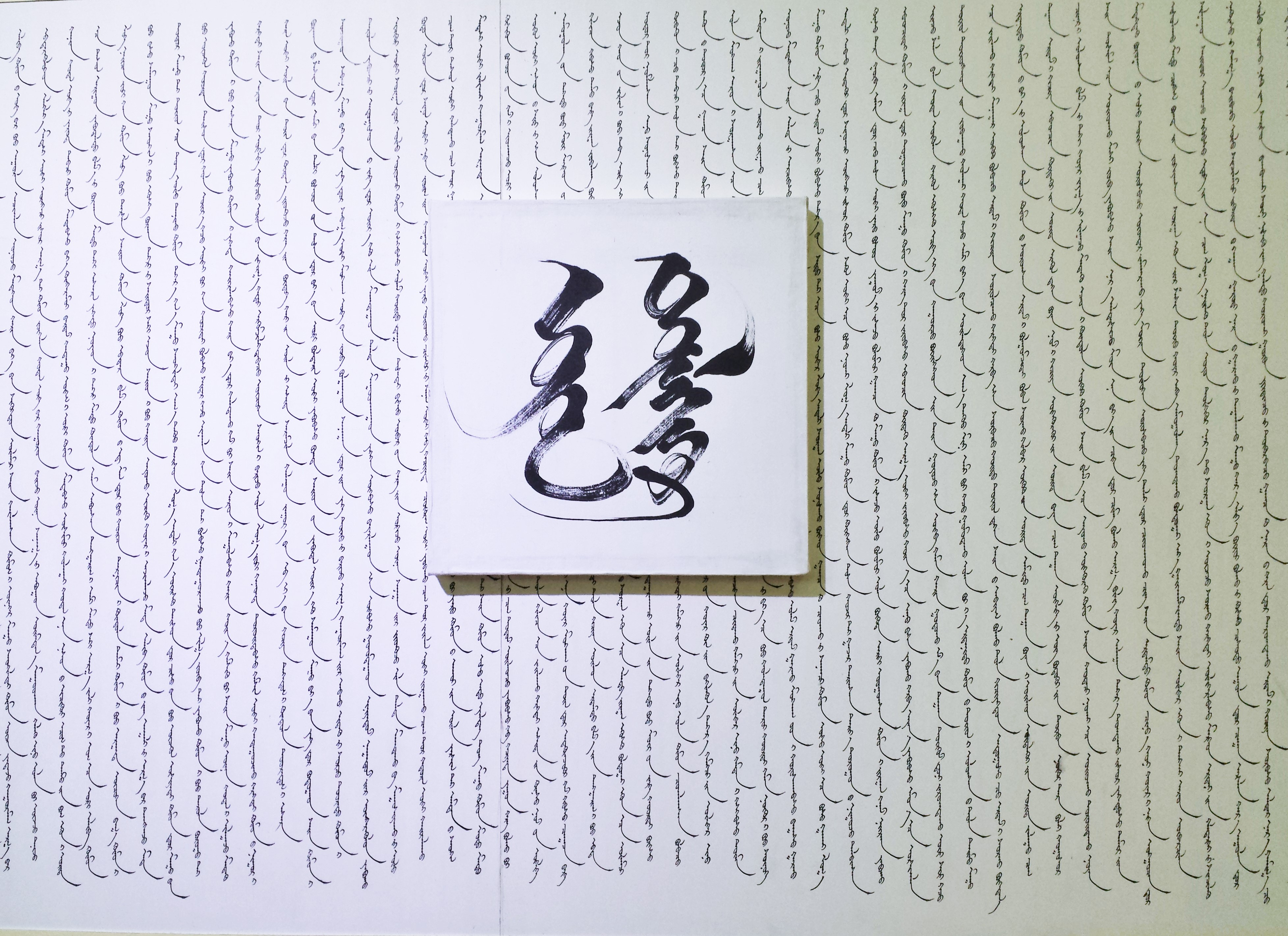

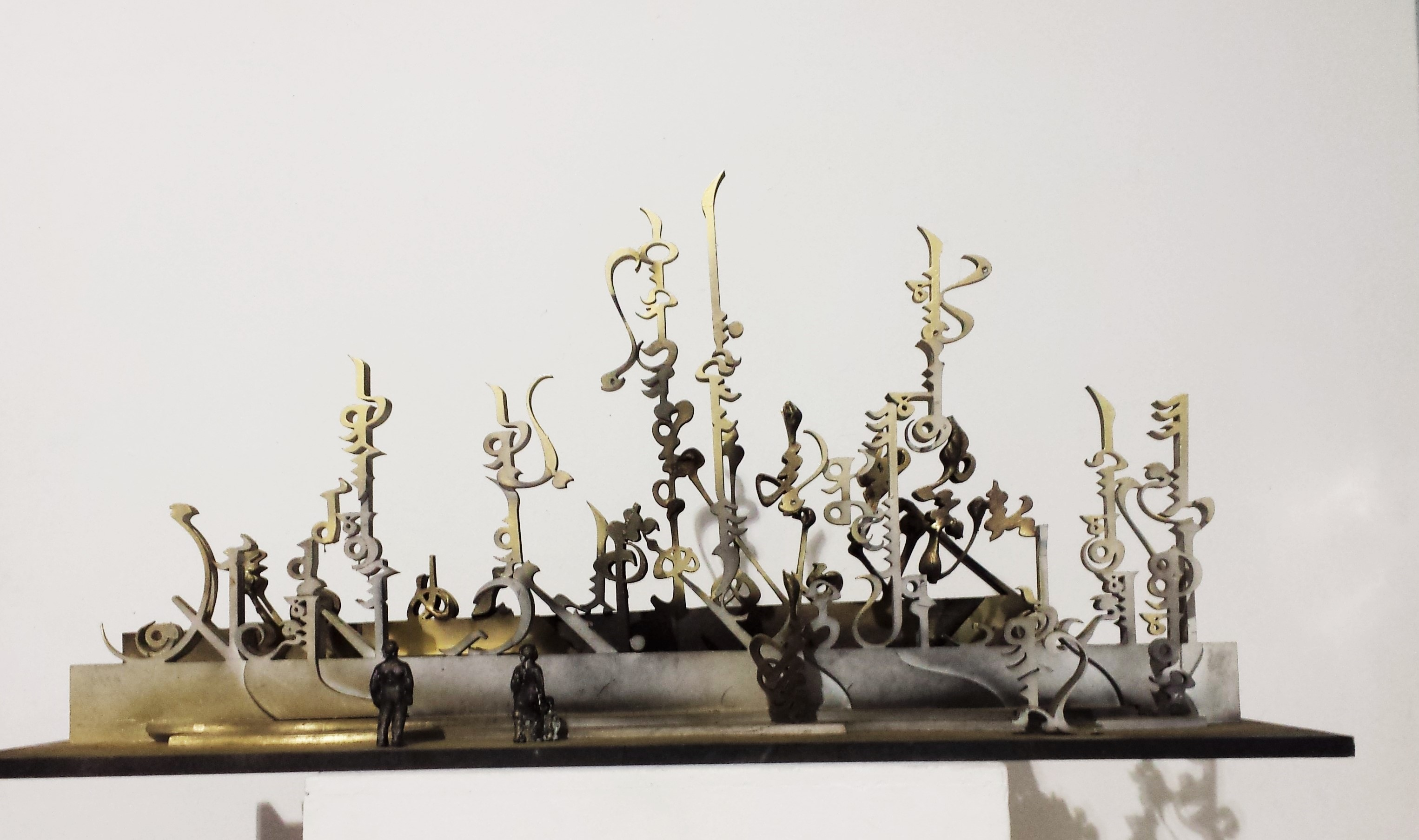

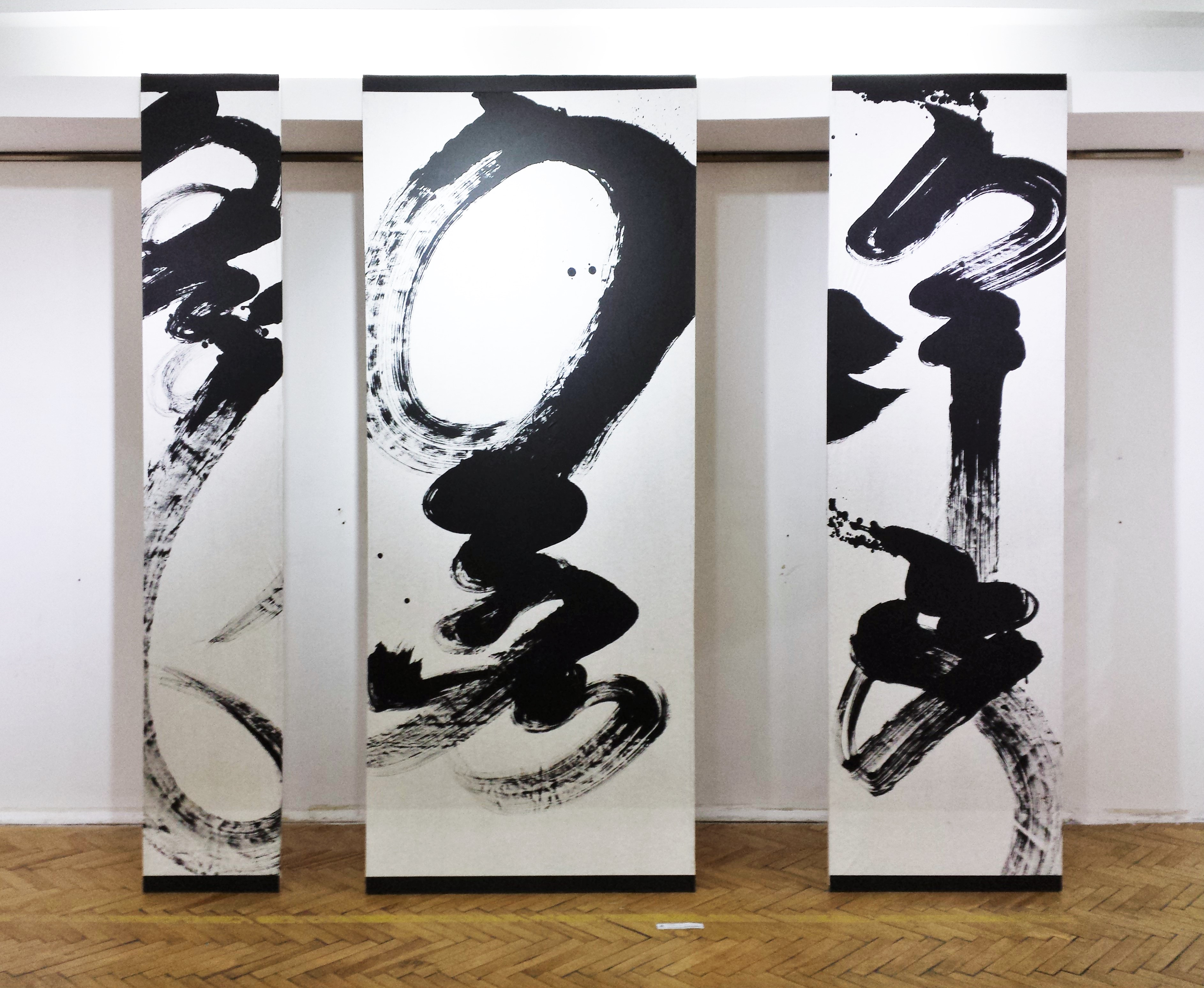

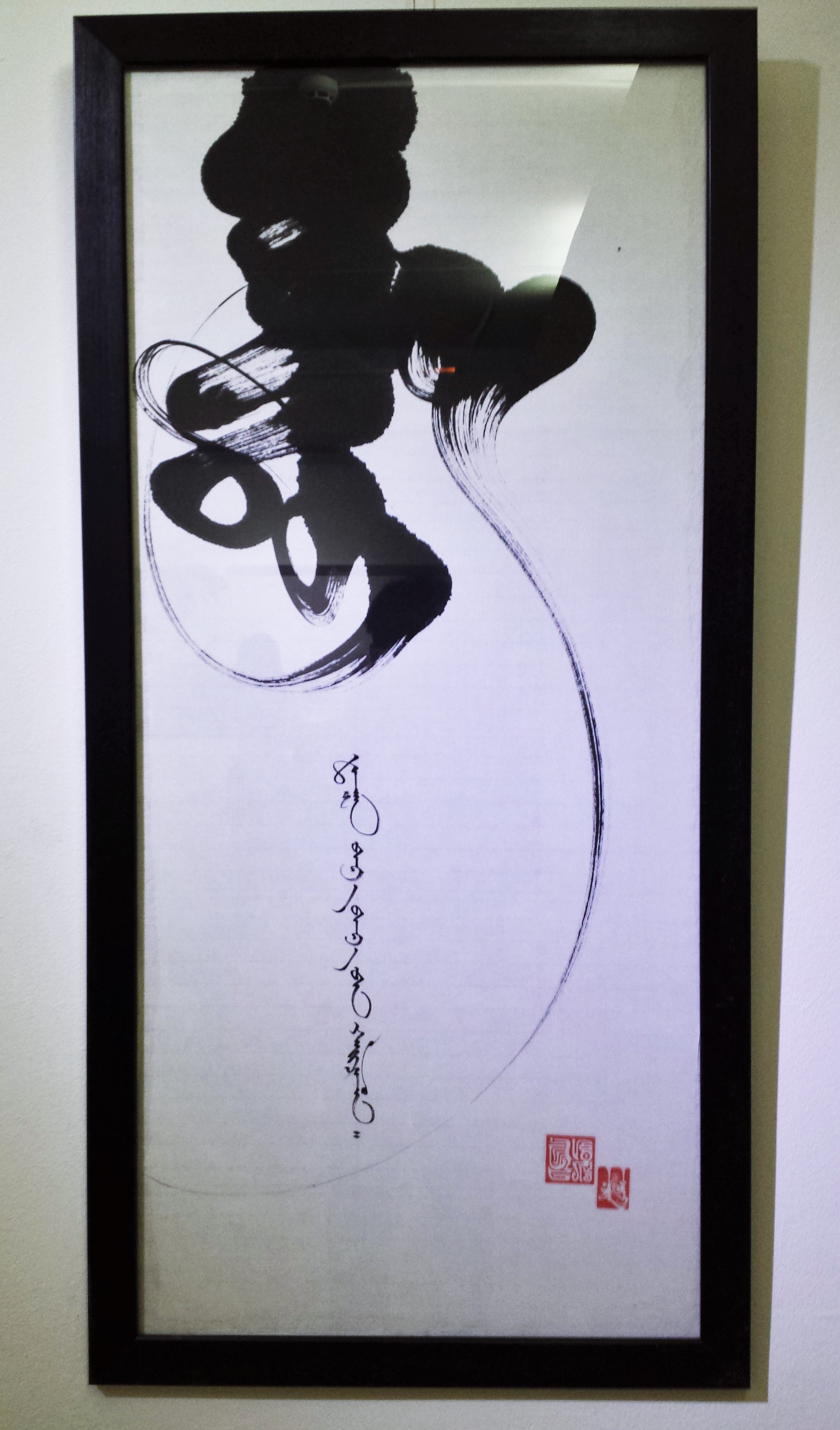

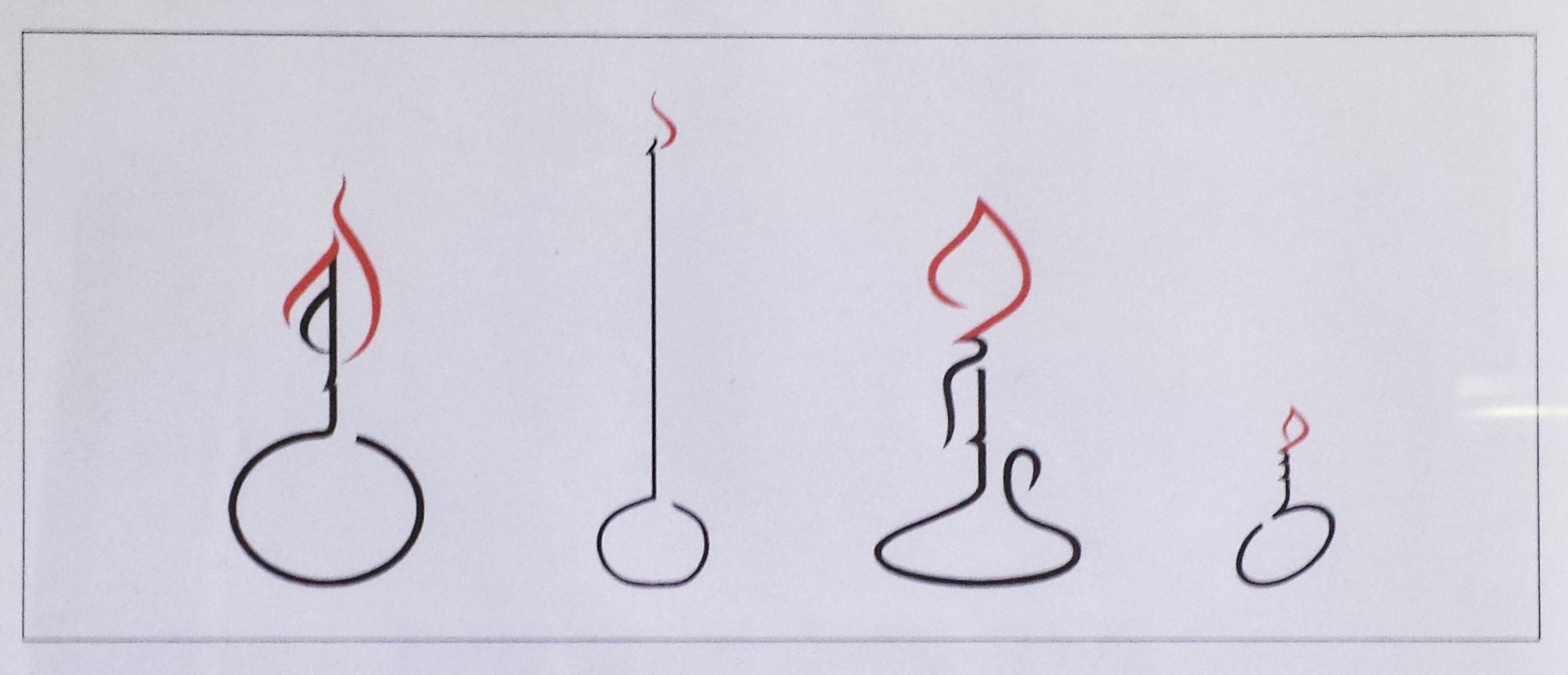

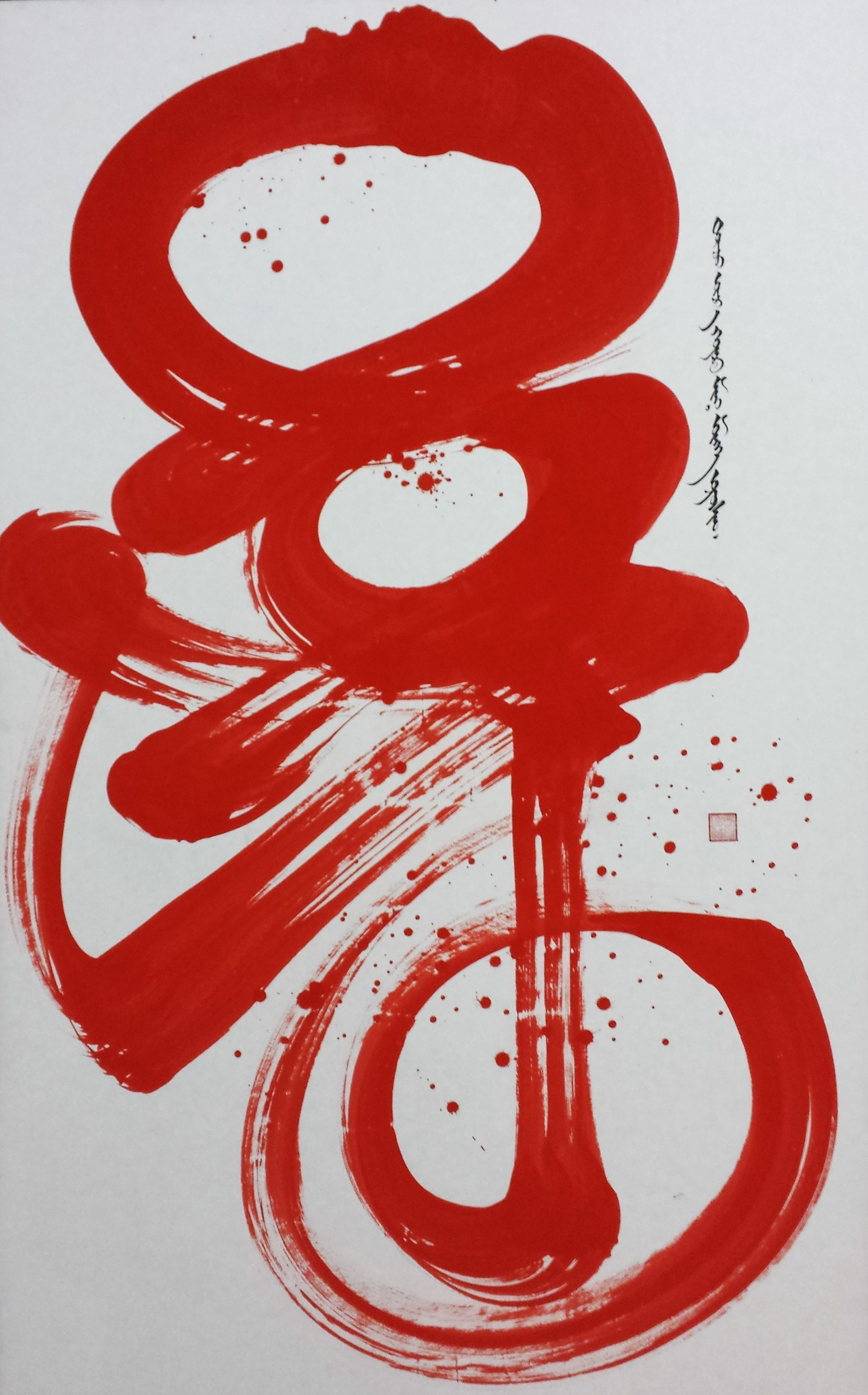

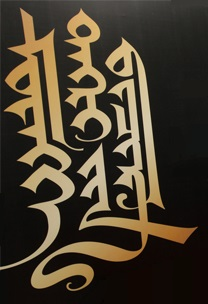

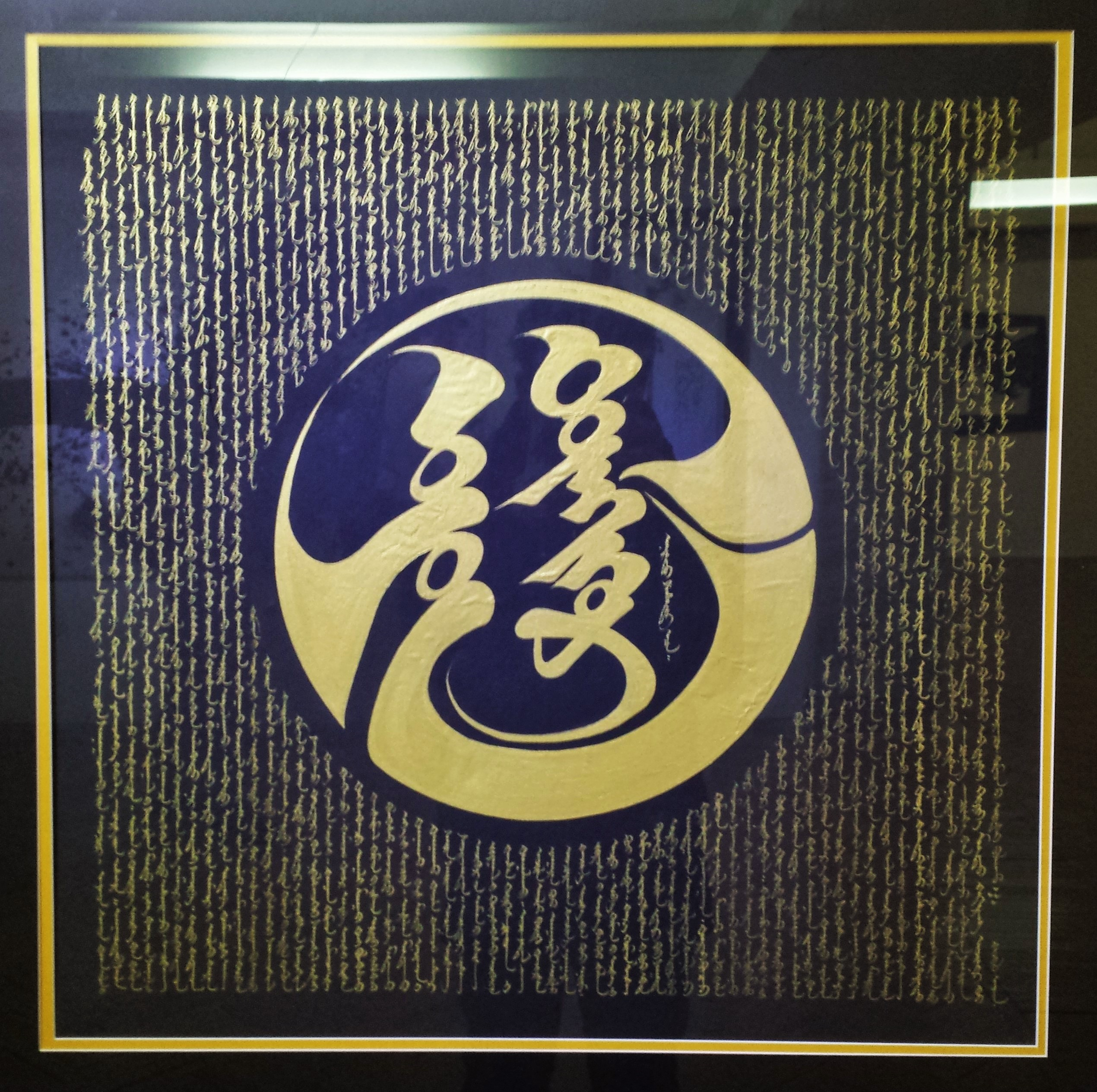

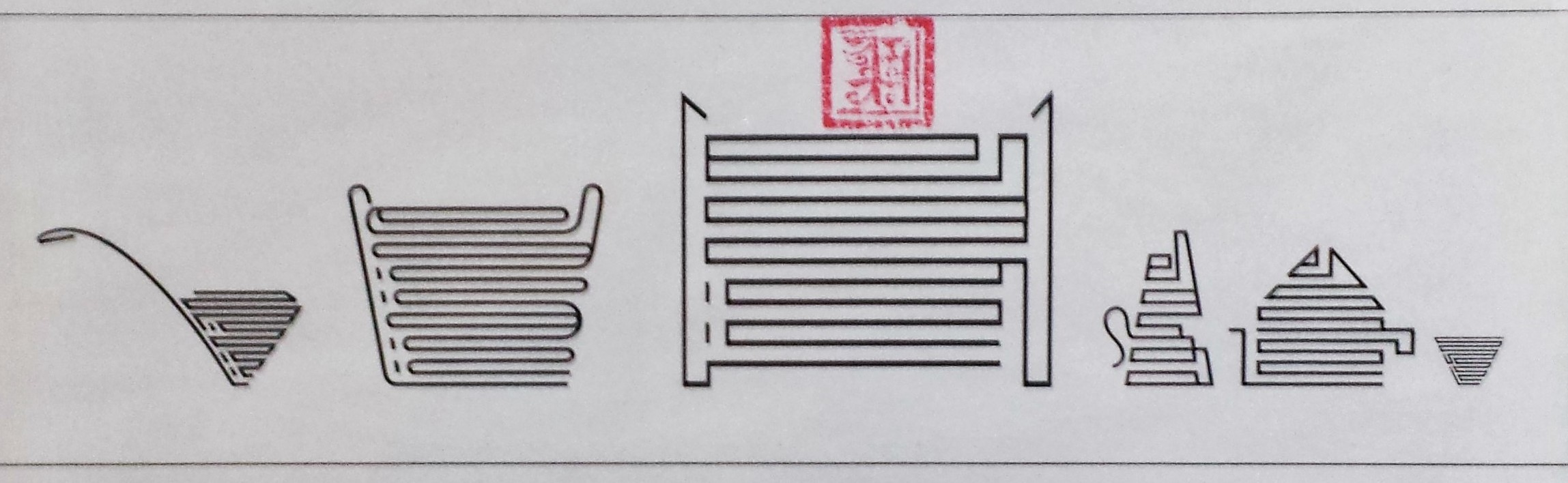

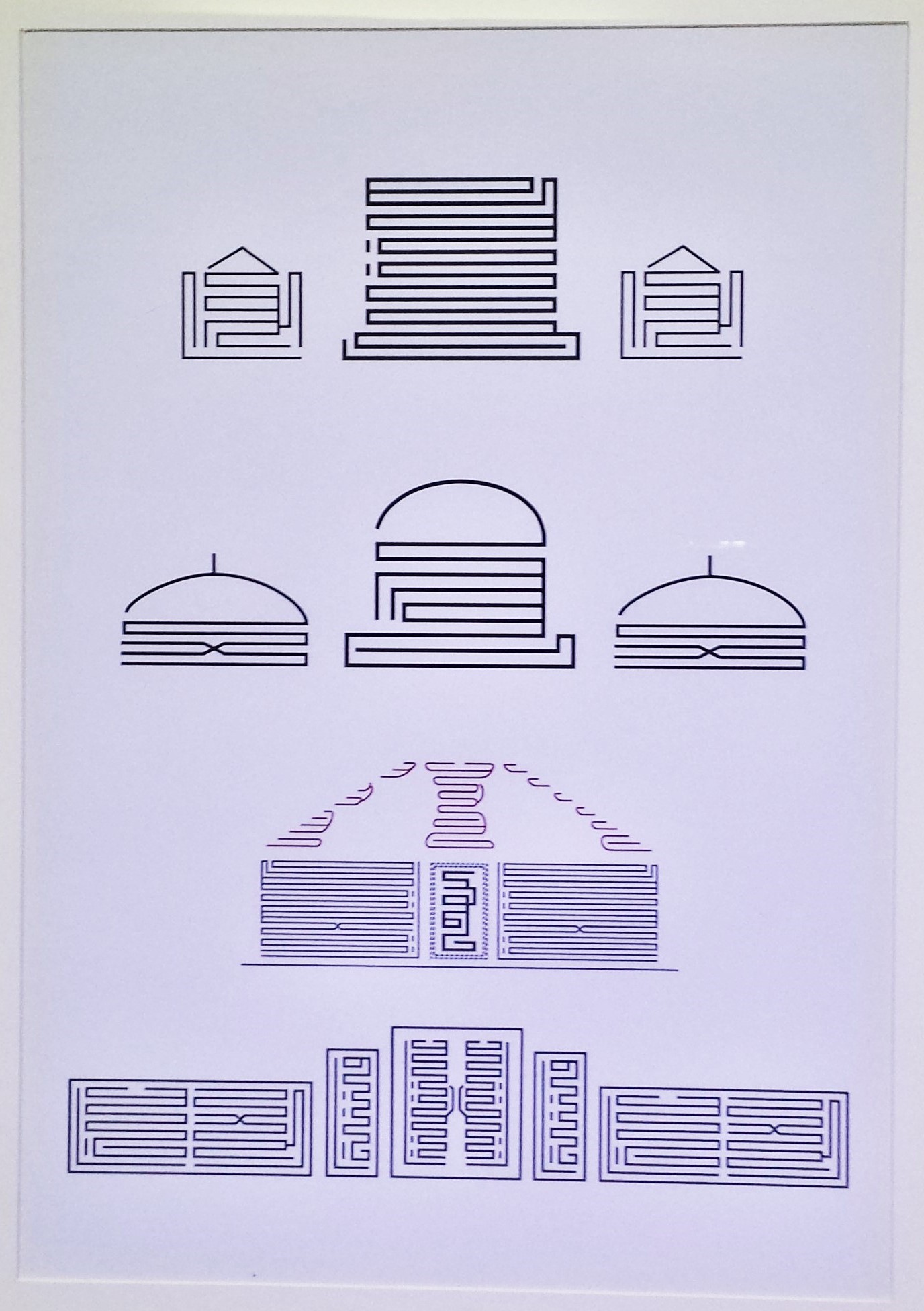
