= Crazy Shagdar =

Crazy Shagdar (Mongolian: Shaγdar soliyatu, 1869–1930s) was a wandering lama from the Baarin banner (in what is now Ulanhad city) in Inner Mongolia. He is the hero of a number of, usually quite critical, tales, in which he mocks corrupt nobles, other lamas etc. One tale deals with how he rebuked Chinese traders on a temple fair:

The annual Baarin temple fair had always attracted many traders from Inner China.

Shagdar came very close to the side of the tent of one of these traders, made a fireplace from three stones, pulled a Tibetan cooking pot from his bundle, then he helped himself to the water from the traders' clay ton and made a fire from their wood. When the eldest of the traders scolded him and called him crazy, Shagdar replied

I, Shagdar, only drank from the waters of my homeland,
Made a fire with nothing but the wood from my hills.
I used none of the water or wood you brought from Shandong!
Squeezing out the people's blood -
That's where you belong, bastards!

That is how he swore at them in both Mongolian and Chinese.

A collection of tales about him appeared in Mukden in 1959, and some of those have been translated into German.
