= BL =

BL (or similar) may refer to:

== Arts and entertainment ==
- Boys' love, a Japanese term for fiction featuring romantic relationships between male characters
- BL Publishing, a division of the wargames manufacturing company, Games Workshop
- Boston Legal, a US legal comedy-drama

== Businesses and organizations ==
- Balmer Lawrie, an Indian government-owned business
- Boys' Latin School of Maryland
- British Leyland, a former UK vehicle manufacturing company
- Pacific Airlines (IATA code BL), a low-cost airline

== Law ==
- Bachelor of Laws (B.L.), an undergraduate degree in law
- Barrister-at-Law, in Ireland and Northern Ireland

== Places ==
- BL postcode area, UK, covering Bolton and Bury in Greater Manchester
- Bakerloo line, a London Underground line
- Banja Luka, a city in Bosnia and Herzegovina
- Bannan line, a Taipei Metro line, code BL
- Saint Barthélemy [ISO country code BL], a Caribbean overseas collectivity of France
- Basel-Landschaft (Basel-Country), a canton of Switzerland
- Province of Belluno, Italy (car-license plate abbreviation BL)
- Blue Line (MBTA), a Boston subway line, code BL
- Bolivia (FIPS Pub 10-4 and obsolete NATO digram BL), a central South American country
- Brazil, LOC MARC code

== Science and technology ==
=== Mathematics and computing ===
- BL (logic), basic fuzzy logic
- BL register, the low byte of an X86 16-bit BX register

=== Other uses in science and technology ===
- Designation of unfiltered black light fluorescent tubes
- British term for breech-loading ordinance

== Other uses ==
- Ы, Yery or Yeru, a letter in the Cyrillic script, which resembles lowercase B and L written together (bl)
- Bill of lading, a receipt issued by a shipping carrier
- Bhutia-Lepcha, an Indian ethnic group
- BL, the production code of the second generation Mazda3/Axela
- Aceh (vehicle registration prefix BL)

== See also ==
- List of BL dramas
