= Biyelgee =

Traditional Mongolian folk dance

- Native name: Биелгээ / Бий
- Genre: Traditional dance
- Instrument(s): Tovshuur; Morin khuur; Ikhel
- Origin: Mongolia

Mongol Biyelgee, Mongolian traditional folk dance
- UNESCO Intangible Cultural Heritage
- Country: Mongolia
- Reference: 00311
- Region: Asia and the Pacific

Inscription history
- Inscription: 2009 (4th session)
- List: Need of Urgent Safeguarding

Biyelgee (Mongolian Cyrillic: Биелгээ) or Bii (Mongolian Cyrillic: Бий), is a traditional dance from Mongolia. Most of the country's regions have their own forms. The Western Mongols (Oirats) are particularly famous for their Biyelgee dance.

== Origin ==
Biyelgee is performed while half-sitting or cross-legged. Hand, shoulder and leg movements express aspects of Mongol herders' everyday lifestyle such as milking cows, cooking, hunting, household labor, customs and traditions, etc. as well as spiritual characteristics tied to different ethnic groups.

Mongolian dance developed very early, as evidenced by a reference in The Secret History of the Mongols: "The Mongqols celebrated by dancing and feasting. ... they danced around the Many-Leaved Tree of Qorqonaq until they stood in furrows up to their ribs and made wounds up to their knees."

== Musical instruments ==
Music is important in Biyelgee. The most common instruments used for accompaniment are the tovshuur, morin khuur (Horse-headed fiddle), and ikhel, sometimes in combination with other instruments.

There are also dances which are performed exclusively to the accompaniment of the human voice, for example, the Buryat dance Yohor.

== Choreography ==
Biyelgee is traditionally performed on the rather limited space before the hearth, so the dancers make practically no use of their feet. Instead, the dancers principally use only the upper part of their bodies, and through their rhythmic movements express various aspects of their identities, such as sex, tribe, and ethnic group.

== Styles ==
Each Mongolian ethnic group has its own particular form of expression. For example:

- The Dörvöd and the Torguud accompany their dances with songs;
- The Bayid dance with their knees bent outwards, balancing on them mugs filled with sour mare-milk (airag);
- The Dörvöd balance mugs filled with airag on their heads and hands;
- The Zakhchin dancers squat as they dance, with the body inclined forward;
- The Buryat dance in a circle, always moving in the direction of the sun; a solo singer improvises pairs of verses followed by the chorus singing the refrain.
