= Ayai =

Ayai (Khmer: អាយ៉ៃខ្មែរ) is one of the four main musical styles of Khmer traditional culture, along with pinpeat, mahori, and phleng khmer. It can be more specifically defined as "repartee singing, usually the theatrical alternation of a man and a woman, accompanied by an ensemble of the same name." Along with smot, while in a very different style, ayai singing has been described as "one of the most fascinating folk music traditions in Cambodia."

== History ==
The Ayai art form originated from popular routines, like many other Khmer traditions. In the past, Cambodian people would perform traditional games - which often included singing and dancing - in their villages, most often during the Khmer New Year festival and other celebrations.

Because of the ribaldry of the language used, ayai singing was considered lewd and this type popular leisure was not recommended for well-bred women in the traditional code of the Chbab Srey.

Before the Cambodian Civil War, one of the most famous ayai singers was Krom Ngoy's grandson, Nay Sleuk.

During the terror regime operated by the Khmer Rouge, most traditional forms of culture, including ayai, were controlled, if not banned. Occasionally, however, it survived as witnessed by Cambodian genocide survivor Daran Kravanh, who was asked to "sing a question and answer back and forth" by his guards feeling nostalgia for these ayai love songs. Khmer singer San Yoeun also confesses singing ayai for the regime's propaganda.

After the 1980s, culture was more free, small groups promoting traditional culture were set up in various provinces such as those by Chheng Phon, and ayai became a popular tool of political contestation, during the Vietnamese occupation of Cambodia. During those years, Ayai icon Prum Manh rose to fame and some of his best pieces have become classics of Cambodian folklore music. Since 2010, ayai traditional chant has fallen in popularity, and "ayai is only heard at weddings or in small villages nowadays".

In 2009, another controversy erupted as the government broke down on the "pornographic" character of the ayai songs and the matter obtained attention of world media.

However, others, such as Cambodian American rapper Prach Ly, see ayai as the inspiration for the new generation of Cambodian rappers in the 21st century as rap is also, a form of "wisdom competition in continuous rhymes." Through rap, ayai is coming back to more popular topics and contemporary social concerns such as welfare and drug abuse.

== Analysis ==
=== Poetry ===
The standard poetic meter of ayai singing consists of four phrases of seven syllables each. Responses from the two parties are usually expected to rhyme with each other according to the rules of Khmer poetry.

=== Content ===
Traditional legends of Khmer literature, Cambodian politics and casual jokes are common topics of ayai singing. While improvisation is the highest for of ayai, predetermined topics are more common for singing in ayai performances on stage. Two singers stand at the front of the stage while musicians sit playing instruments behind them. The vocalists describe a story and tell jokes directly to the audience.

=== Style ===
Ayai involves two singers, usually male and female, verbally jousting with each others questions through rhyming verses in Khmer language. Sarcasm as well as irony is often relied upon. These singers need to sing humorously. One singer begins the story then the other starts a new sentence that rhymes with the other singer's line. The singers need to be quick and intelligent in forming sentences that rhyme. Young Ayai singers have to learn rhyming words by heart at home before a performance.

Its style is similar to lam klawn repartee singing as performed in Thailand.

== Music ==
=== Vocal technique ===
Ayai is a form an alternate singing. This singing style which is often used while courting is also found in Montagnard groups of Indochina. It is called rang by the Muong, luon by the Tay, sly by the Nung, avong by the Bahnar. Ayai has also been compared to mor lam in neighbouring Laos.

=== Instruments ===
Up to six different instruments can be used to accompany ayai singing. The tro sor, a violin-like instrument with light tones, the tro ou, similar but with heavier tones, the takhe, the khloy bamboo flute, the skor daey hand-drum, and the ching cymbals. Some musicians also include one more instrument such as the khim, a harp with 16 strings sounded with bamboo hammers. The accompanying instruments usually introduce and echo the lines of the two singers according to standard patterns. About 15 songs make up an average ayai performance.

== Training ==
While ayai singing was traditionally passed on orally from one generation to another, it has since the 1990s been taught at Phnom Penh's Royal University of Fine Arts. Chin Cheang and his wife Ouk Sopha, both very popular ayai performers, are teaching the course.

As a form of repartee singing, ayai requires particular wit, in particular when performed as on-stage improvisation.
