= Skor daey =

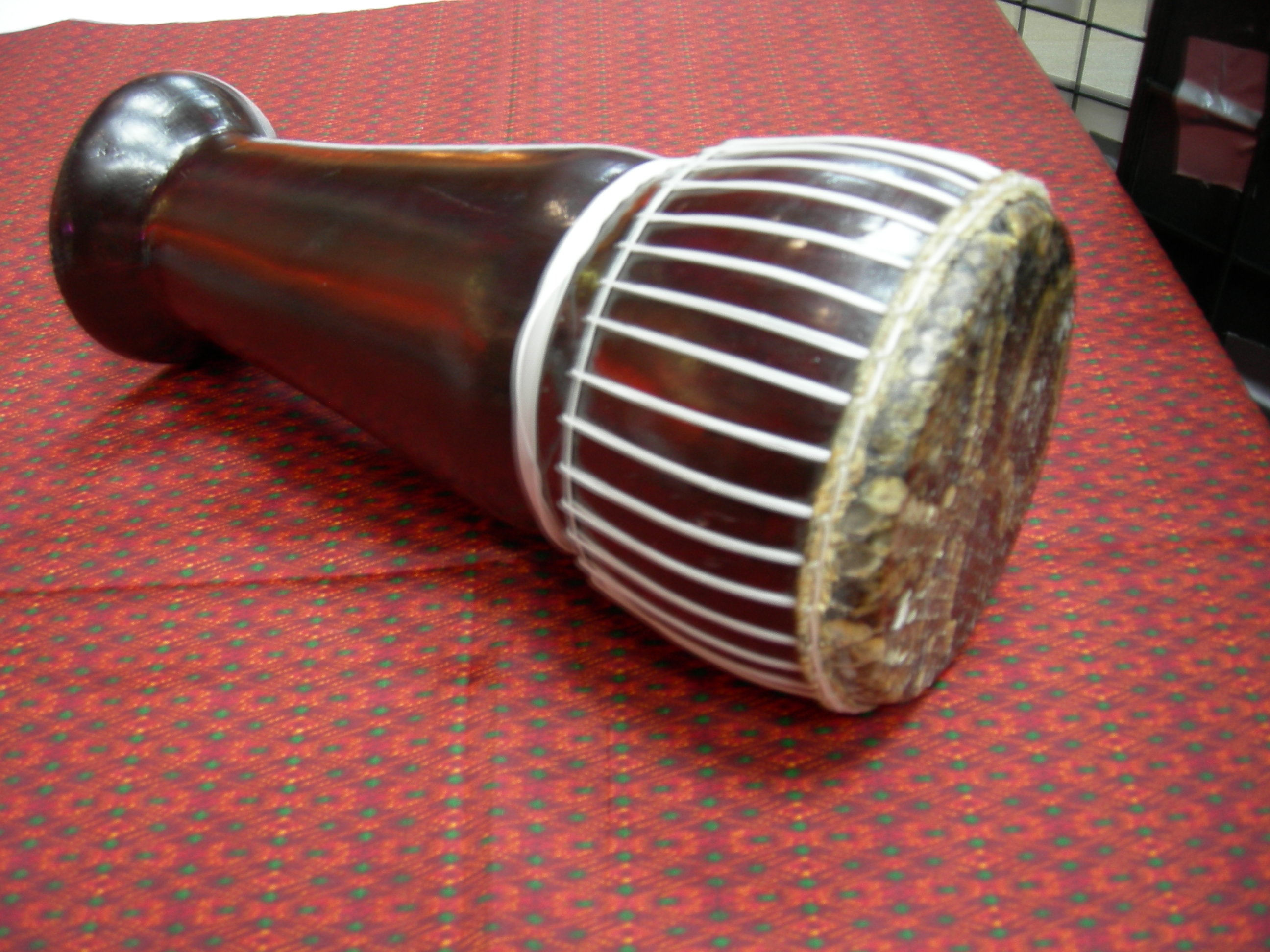
Goblet drum called skor daey (Khmer: ស្គរដៃ), meaning hand drum. This is the smaller of two Cambodian goblet drums, the larger being called skor chhaiyam (Khmer: ស្គរឆៃយ៉ាំ).

Two instruments being played by Cambodian musicians. The drum is one of the Cambodian goblet drums (skor daey, skor kar, skor arak or another). The fiddle is a tro (either the Tro sau thom or Tro sau toch).

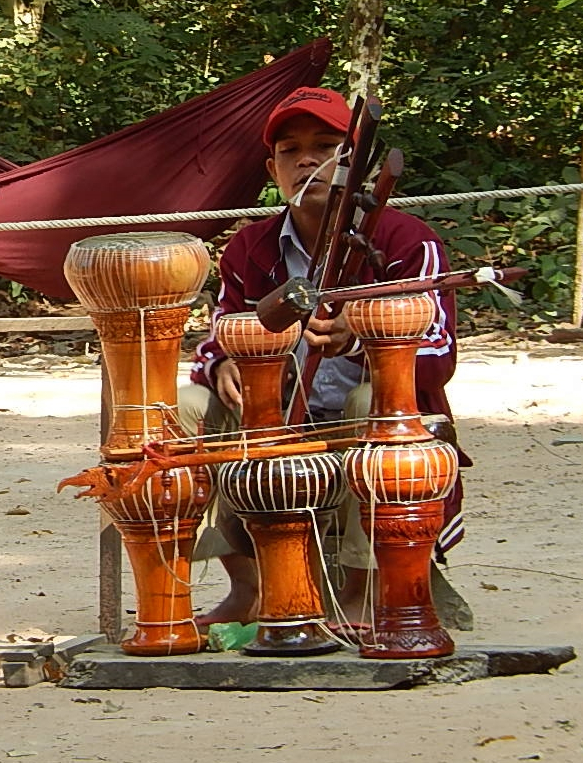
A salesman with goblet drums in Cambodia.

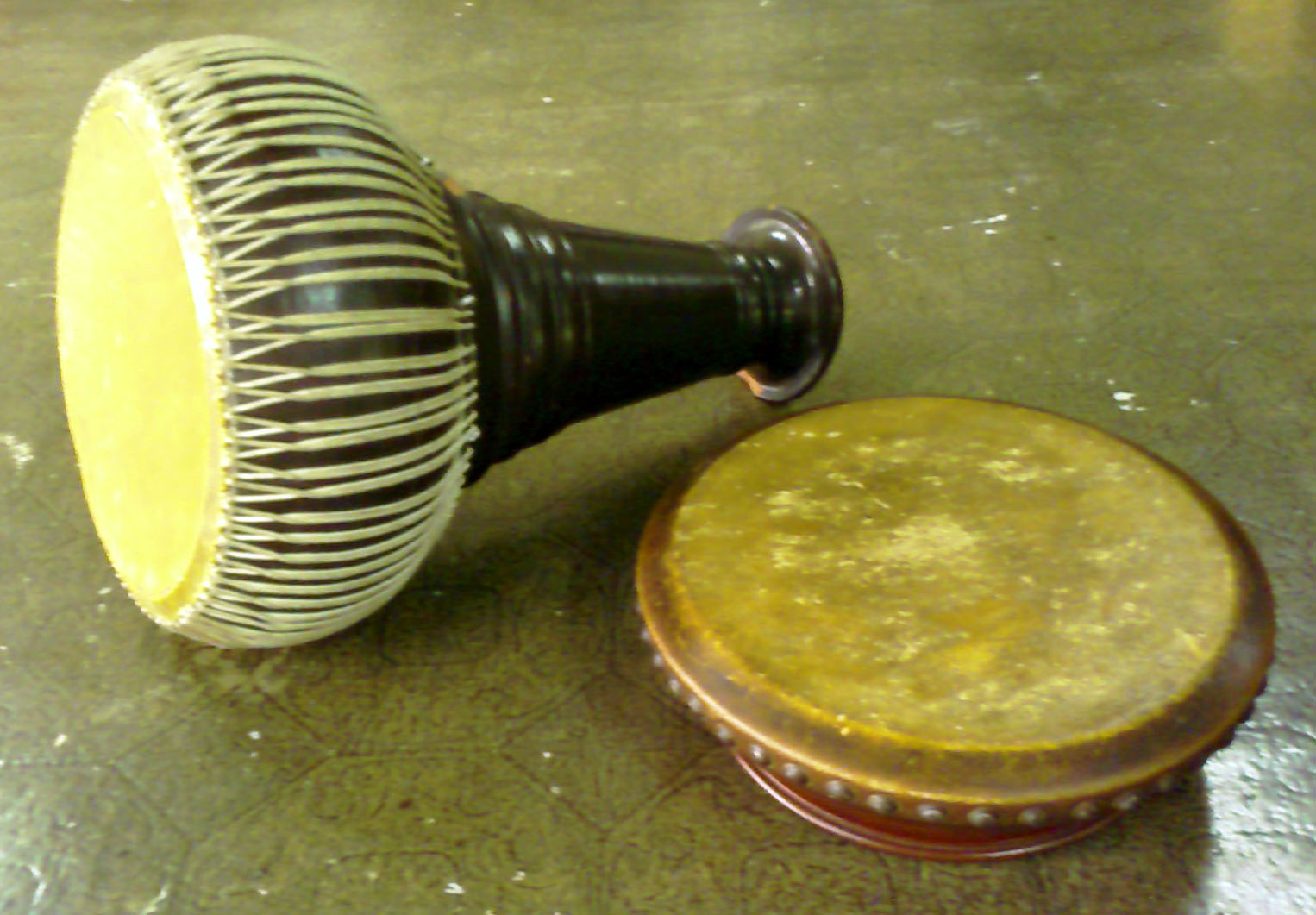
Two drums used in both Cambodia and Thailand. Left is the thon (Thai: โทน). On the right is the ramama (Thai: รำมะนาa).

The skor daey (ស្គរដៃ "hand drum" or "clay drum") is a short goblet drum from Cambodia, approximately 40 centimeters tall and 15 centimeters wide at the top. There are two common goblet drums there, the skor chhaiyam (Khmer: ស្គរឆៃយ៉ាំ), a very long goblet drum, resembling some from Burma, and the skor daey.

Alternative spellings in English include skor dai (hand) and skor dei (clay, also alternative in Khmer: ស្គរដី). Other Khmer names included skor arak, skor kar (ស្គរការ), skor ayai (ស្គរអាយ៉ៃ។). The name skor areak or skor arak or skor aaroksa (Khmer:ស្គរអារក្ស) links this variant to the Arak music it is used to play. Skor kar linked it to kar boran music for weddings, where two drums are used, representing male and female. Skor ayai refers to ayai repartee singing, in which a man and woman alternate quick, witty comments or replies back and forth, accompanied by an ensemble. The small goblet drums may also be called skor toch, (Khmer: ស្គរតូច), literally small drum, but that may be a description and not a name.

Another small goblet drum used in Cambodia is the thon, a Thai name: โทน. Compared to the Skor daey, it "has a shallower head and a slimmer body."

== See also ==
- Music of Cambodia
