= Mi gyaung =

Musical instrument

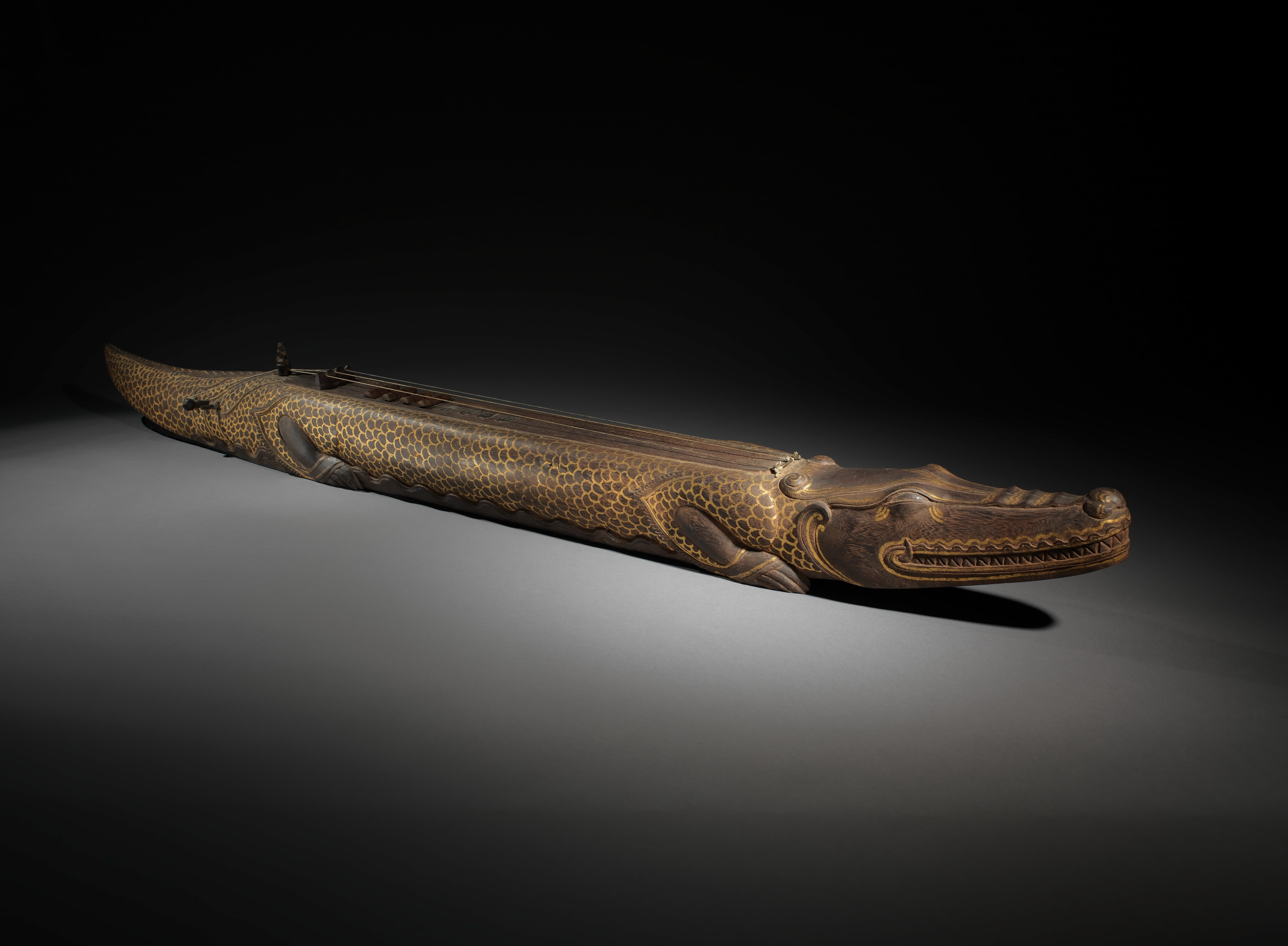
- Mi gyaung, 19th century

String instrument
- Classification: String instrument (plucked)

The mi gyaung (Burmese: မိကျောင်း [mḭ dʑáʊɰ̃]) or kyam (Mon: ကျာံ, [cam]; pronounced "chyam") is a crocodile-shaped fretted, plucked zither with three strings that is used as a traditional instrument in Burma. It is associated with the Mon people. Both Burmese and Mon names also mean 'crocodile.'

Tube zither of Myanmar, carved of wood in the shape of a crocodile with extended head and tail. It has three metal strings which pass over eight to ten raised movable frets on the flat top of the instrument and fasten to tuning pegs near the tail. This zither is related to similar instruments distributed widely in Southeast Asia. While the crocodile shape is not always found elsewhere, the reptilian name remains in variants such as the Thai čhakchē (‘alligator’, wooden tube zither) and the Indonesian and Philippine kacapi (box zither). In southern Myanmar the mí-gyaùng is associated with the Mon (who know it as kyam), an ethnic people linguistically related to the Mon-Khmer of Thailand and Cambodia.

The instrument's body is made of wood that is carved out on the underside like a dugout canoe. It has approximately 13 raised wooden frets that are diatonically rather than equidistantly or chromatically spaced. It has a carved crocodile's head and tail, as well as four legs. Its strings are tuned (from low to high) FCF. The lowest string is made of brass and the two higher strings are made from nylon. It is plucked with a short rod-shaped plectrum that tapers to a point, made of horn or hardwood. Unlike the Thai jakhe, the plectrum is not tied onto the right index finger, but instead simply held in the hand. Tremolo technique is often used. The instrument has a buzzing sound because the strings are raised just off the flat bridge by a sliver of bamboo or other thin material such as plastic.

It is similar to the Thai jakhe, the Cambodian krapeu (takhe), and Indonesian/Filipino kacapi. However, while the mi gyaung has realistic zoological features, its Thai and Cambodian relatives' animal forms are much more abstract.

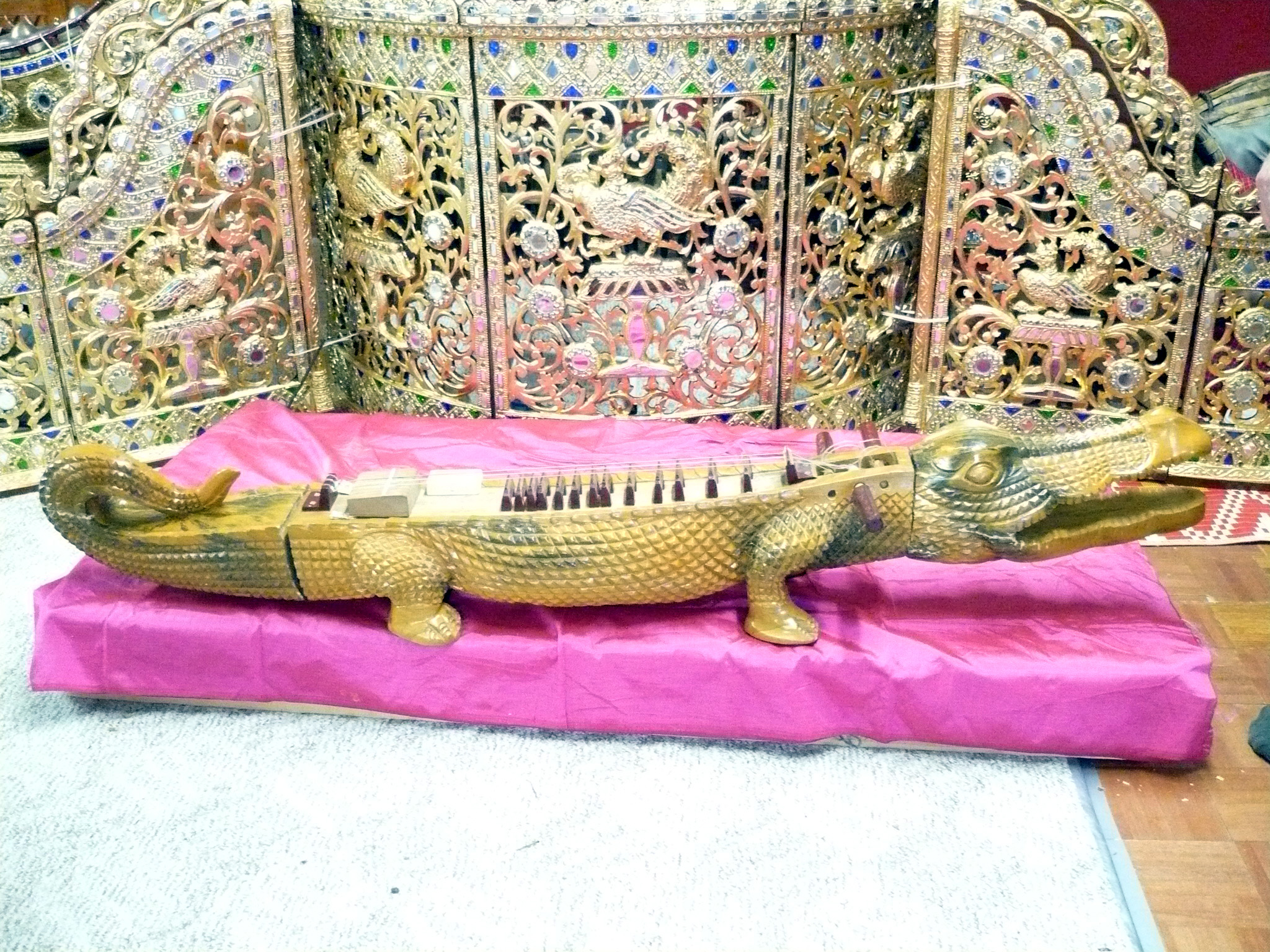
A kyam at the Mon Buddhist Temple in Fort Wayne, Indiana

A demonstration of the Mon crocodile zither
