= Prum Manh =

Cambodian actor

Prum Manh (Khmer: ព្រហ្ម ម៉ាញ) is a Cambodian comedian and ayai singer who survived the Khmer Rouge regime and currently has one of the longest careers as an actor in Cambodia along with Dy Saveth.

== Biography ==
Prum Manh was born around 1950 from a family of ordinary peasants in the province of Kampong Speu. He has four male siblings with the first brother specializing in sculpture design, the second brother being a teacher and his youngest brother is a traditional Bokator boxer. Prum Manh was the only one in his family to start a career in the performing arts.

He began his career as an Ayai performer during the Khmer Republic in 1970 at the age of 20.

During the Khmer Rouge terror regime, all his family members were decimated leaving him alone. He lived in Toek Chor commune on the border of Banteay Meanchey province. Prum Manh had to hide linguistic talents from the Khmer Rouge and was able to survive because he is also a skilled barber. After the end of this dark regime, Prum Manh came back to the stage at the age of 30, performing in the Ayai duo, and to this day, his reputation has spread throughout Cambodia.

Prum Manh has performed abroad, in countries such as performing in France, Australia and the United States.

In March 2007, Prime Minister Hun Sen referred to Prum Manh as an example of the freedom of expression and movement in Cambodia, as Prum Manh has often been seen expressing his critical opinions in politics.

In 2008, Prum Manh was involved in an accident in which his motorbike was hit by a car, which he accused of being an intentional attempt of homicide..

In 2010, Prum Manh took part in the Khmer Rouge Tribunal by acting for Khmer and Cham villagers, in an effort to promote justice and heal trauma among the population.

His niece, Srey Pov, is also following his career in Cambodian performing arts.

== Style ==
Prum Manh is a traditional Cambodian singer, who also has foreign influences such as Charlie Chaplin, who in 1935 visited Cambodia where he left a lasting influence. He is notorious for creating new jokes and puns while involving the audience.

While he remains widely popular among both men and women, young and old, some consider his humor to have aged, as in the case where he created a controversy by making fun of a speech disability in October 2022, and he presented an apology.

== Honors ==
In 2022, while he was suffering from arterial tension at the hospital, Prum Manh received an honorary doctorate for his long career in acting by the Royal Decree dated April 9, 2022 at the request of the Prime Minister of Cambodia Samdech Hun Sen.

== See also ==
- Ayai, preferred repertoire of Prum Manh
