= Chakhe =

Musical instrument

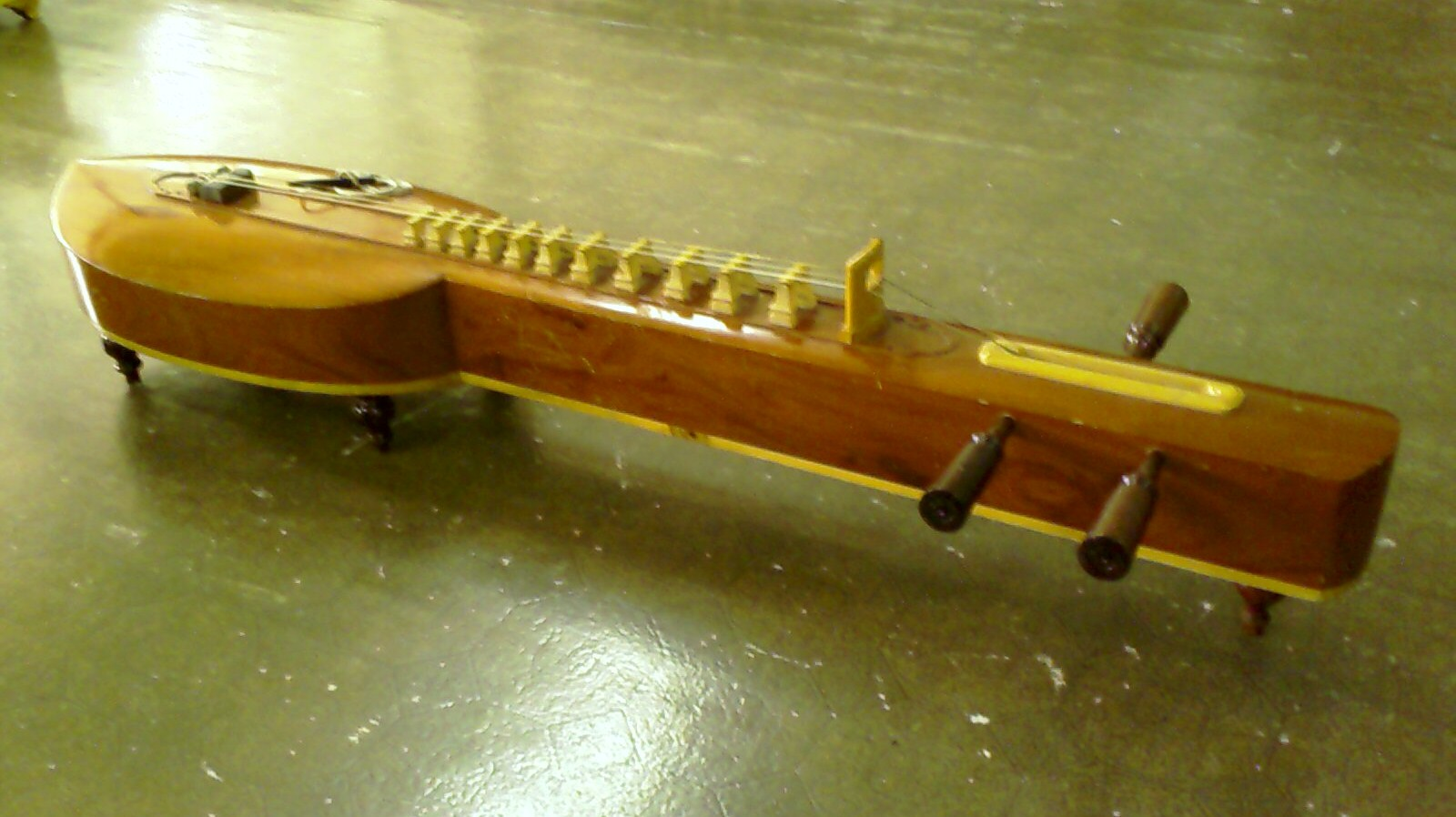
- Thai chakhe

String instrument
- Other names: Takhe, krapeu
- Classification: String (plucked)
- Hornbostel–Sachs classification: 314.122 (box zither)

Related instruments
- Mi gyaung Takhe

The chakhe (Thai: จะเข้, pronounced [tɕā.kʰêː], or krapeu (Khmer: ក្រពើ), also called takhe (Khmer: តាខេ), also called ja-khe (Lao: ຈະເຂ້, pronounced [tɕā.kʰȅː]), is a fretted floor zither or lute with three strings. The Thai and the Khmer versions of the instrument are virtually identical.

It is made of hardwood in a stylized crocodile shape, approximately 20 cm high and 130–132 cm long. The "head" portion is 52 cm long, 28 cm wide and 9–12 cm deep; the "tail" portion 81 cm long and 11.5 cm wide. It has eleven (takhe) or twelve (krapeu) raised frets made of bamboo, ivory, bone, or wood, graduated between 2 and 3.5 cm in height, which are affixed to the fretboard with wax or glue. Its highest two strings are made of silk yarn, catgut, or nylon, while the lowest is made of metal. They are tuned C–G–c. The instrument is usually supported by three or five legs.

The player, sitting beside the instrument, uses their left hand on the fretboard while plucking the string with their right hand using a 5- to 6-cm long, tapered plectrum made from ivory, bone, or water buffalo horn, which is tied to the player's index finger, and bracing it with the thumb and index finger. The instrument produces a buzzing sound because the strings are raised slightly off the flat bridge by a sliver of bamboo or other thin material such as plastic.

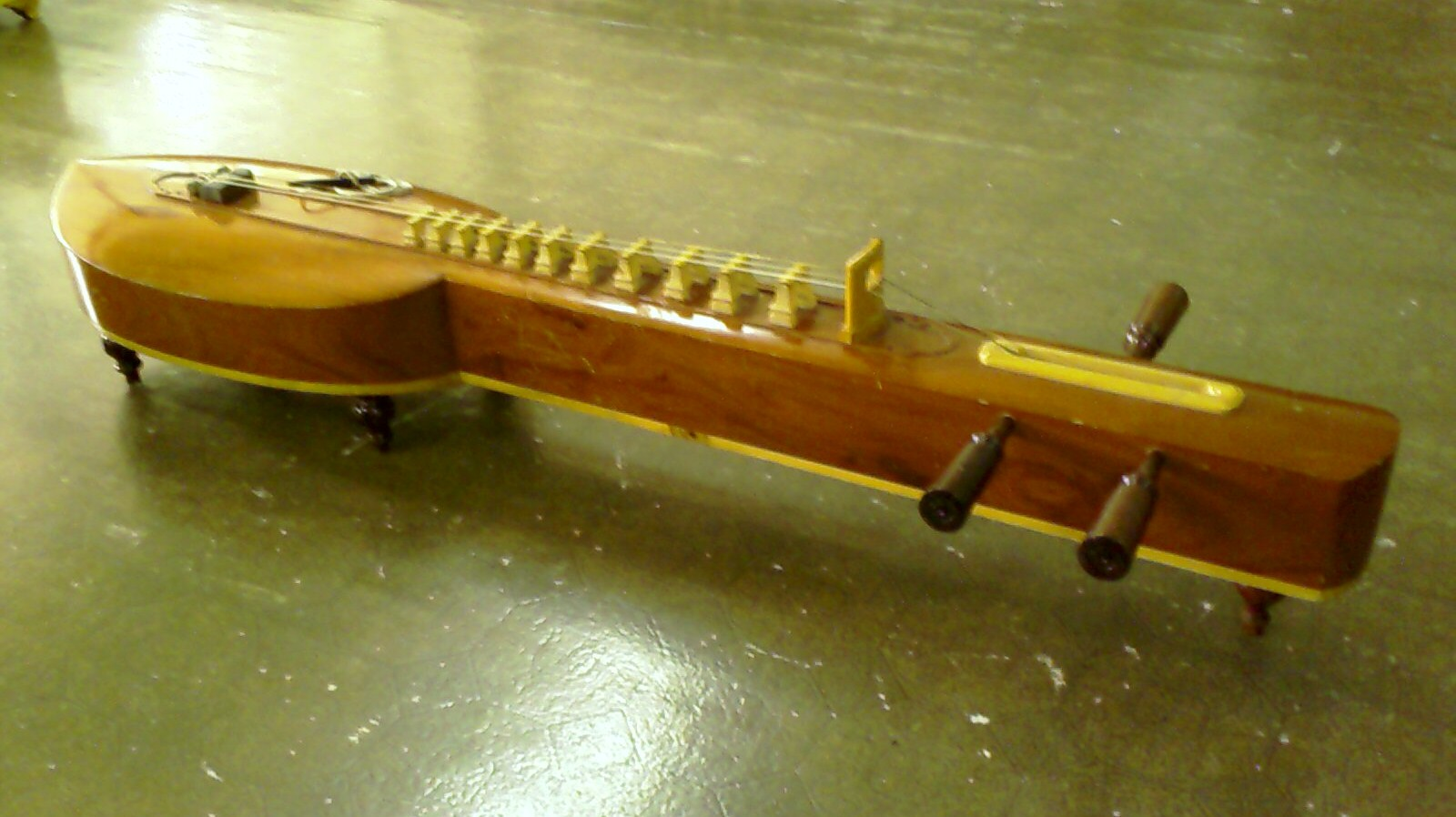
The Chakhe is a Thai musical instrument with three strings. It can be played by plucking a small stick against the strings.

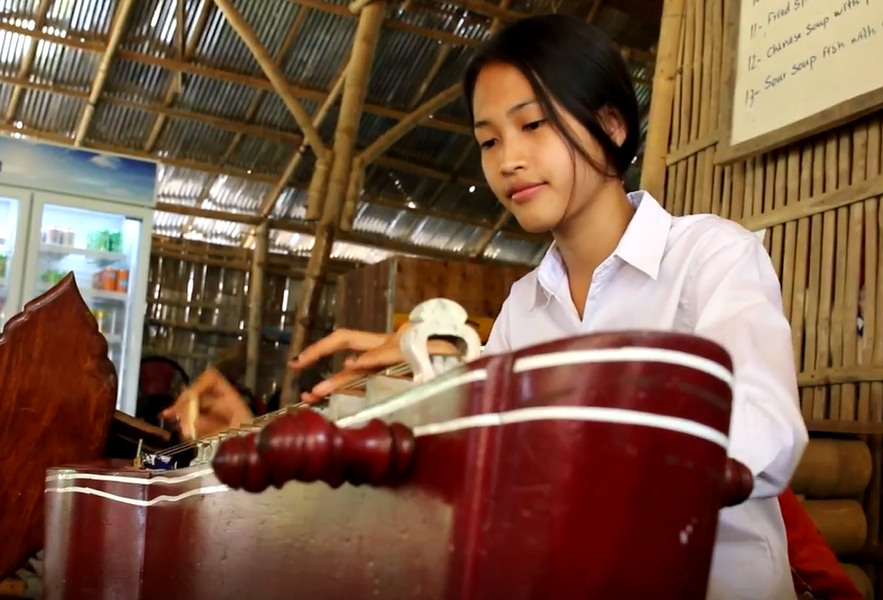
Cambodian woman playing a krapeu ក្រពើ or takhe តាខេ. The drum that is audible is a skor daey goblet drums or another short Cambodian goblet drum

In Thai music, the chakhe is part of the Mahori ensemble; in Khmer music, the krapeu is part of the equivalent Mohori. The word krapeu means "alligator" or "crocodile" in the Khmer language. The name Chakhe meaning "crocodile" in the Thai language. Chakhe and krapeu are also related to the Myanmar/Mon mi gyaung (kyam), which has realistic zoological features and not just the abstract form of a crocodile. More distantly, they are also related to the Indian Veena.

== See also ==
- Mi gyaung
