= Goblet drum =

Middle Eastern drum

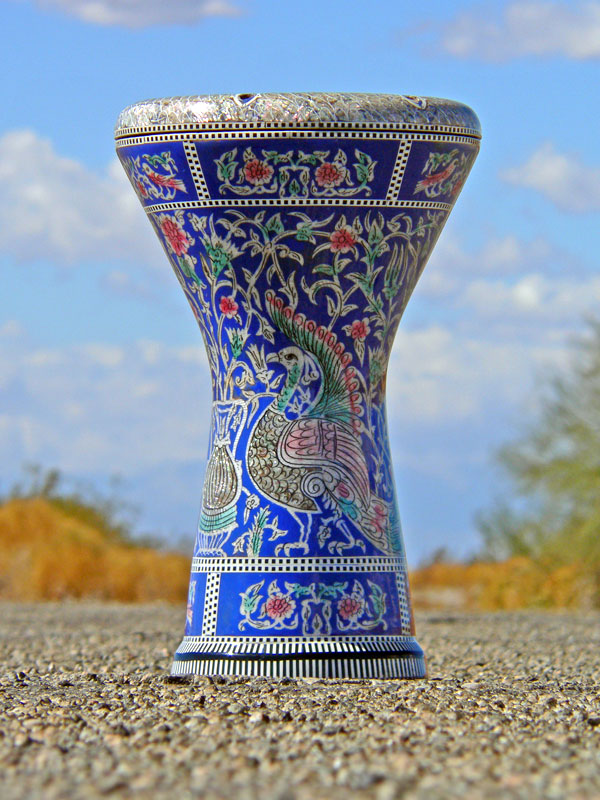

Percussion instrument
- Other names: Chalice drum, tarabuka (tarambuka), tarabaki, darbuka, derbake, debuka, doumbek, dumbec, dumbeg, dumbelek, dumbul, toumperleki (tumberleki), tumbak, zerbaghali
- Classification: Hand percussion, membranophone
- Hornbostel–Sachs classification: 211.26

The goblet drum (also chalice drum, tarabuka, tarabaki, darbuka, darabuka, derbake, debuka, doumbek, dumbec, dumbeg, dumbelek, toumperleki, tumbak, tabla, or zerbaghali; Arabic: دربوكة / Romanized: darbuka) is a single-head membranophone with a goblet-shaped body. It is most commonly used in the traditional music of North Africa, the Middle East, and the Balkans. The instrument is also featured in traditional music from South Asia and Eastern Europe. The West African Goblet drums have been around for thousands of years and were used in Mesopotamian and Ancient Egyptian cultures. They were also seen in Babylonia and Sumer from as early as 1100 BCE. On Sulawesi, large goblet drums are used as temple instruments and placed on the floor when played, which may reflect ancient use of the drum.

The origin of the term Darbuka lies in the rural Egyptian Arabic slang word that changed "darb" meaning "to strike" into "darbuka".

== Technique ==
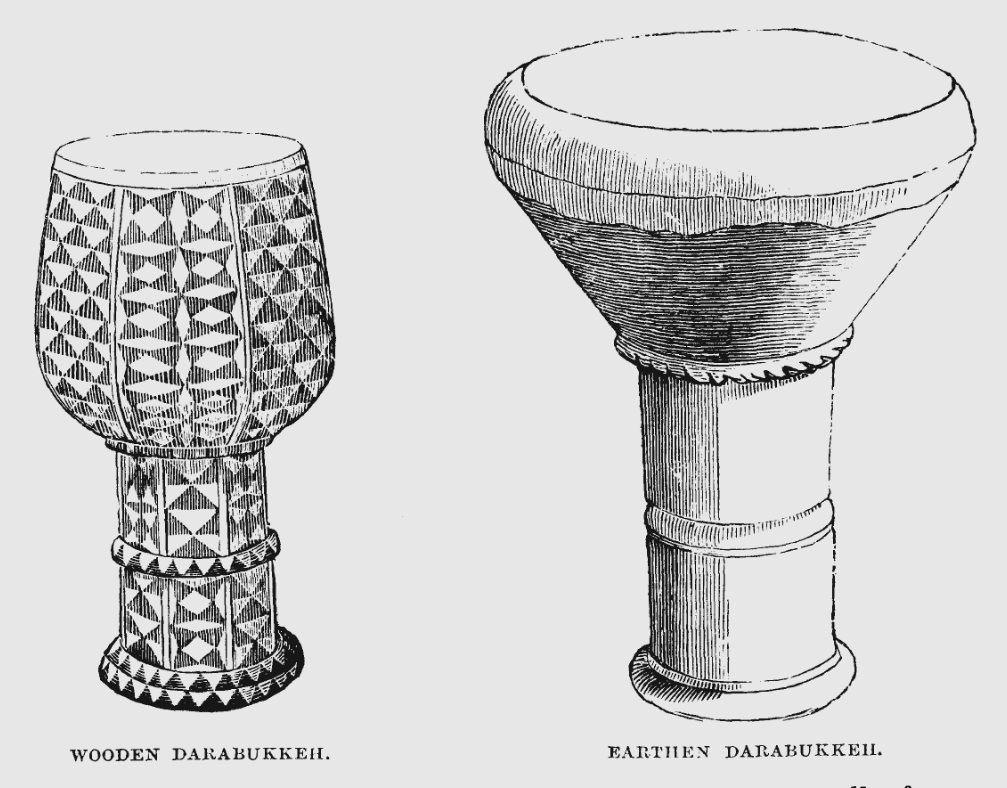
Darabukka from Egypt, 1825~35. From Lane 1836, p. 363

Sound of Darbuka

The Eastern and North-African goblet drums are played under the arm or resting on the player's leg, with a much lighter touch and quite different strokes to hand drums such as the djembe, found in West Africa – the strokes used with goblet drums sometimes include rolls or quick rhythms articulated with the fingertips.

There are two main types of goblet drums. The Egyptian style, Darbuka, is also known as Tabla (Arabic: طبلة) and is very popular; it has rounded edges around the head, whereas the Turkish style exposes the edge of the head. The exposed edge allows closer access to the head so finger-snapping techniques can be done, but the hard edge discourages the rapid rolls possible with the Egyptian style.

The goblet drum may be played while held under one arm (usually the non-dominant arm) or by placing it sideways upon the lap (with the head towards the player's knees) while seated. Some drums are also made with strap mounts so the drum may be slung over the shoulder, to facilitate playing while standing or dancing. It produces a resonant, low-sustain sound while played lightly with the fingertips and palm. Some players move their fists in and out of the bell to alter the tone. Some players also place their hands on the surface of the drum to produce a muted sound. There are a variety of rhythms (see dumbek rhythms) that form the basis of the folkloric and modern music and dance styles of the Middle East.

There are three main sounds produced by the goblet drum. The first is called a "doom". It is the deeper bass sound produced by striking the head near the center with the length of the fingers and palm and taking off the hand for an open sound. The second is called the "tak" and is the higher-pitched sound produced by hitting near the edge of the head with the fingertips. A "tak" struck with the secondary hand is also known as a "ka". The third is the closed sound "pa" (also called "sak"), for which the hand is briefly rested on the head so as not to permit an open sound. Additionally, there are more complex techniques including snaps, slaps, pops and rolls that are used to ornament the basic rhythm. Hand clapping and hitting the sides of the drum can be used in addition to drumhead sounds.

Another technique commonly used in Greece, Bulgaria, North Macedonia, Albania and Turkey is to tap with the fingers of one hand and with a thin drum stick in the other. In Turkey the stick is called the çubuk, which means wand, or stick, and where the Romanis there occasionally use this technique.

== Use in Western classical music ==
The first known Western classical composition to feature a goblet drum is the opera Les Troyens (1856–1858) by the French composer Hector Berlioz, which calls for a tarbuka in the Dance of the Nubian Slaves in Act IV.

The first compositions for goblet drum and orchestra were composed by the Egyptian-American musician Halim El-Dabh in the 1950s; his Fantasia-Tahmeel for goblet drum and strings was premiered in New York City in 1958, with a string orchestra conducted by Leopold Stokowski.

== Notable goblet drum musicians ==
- Mustapha Antari
- Setrak Sarkissian
- Said El Artist
- Hossam Ramzy
- Rony Barrak
- Carmine Guida
- Djamchid Chemirani
- Pettik Ádám
- Bilal Göregen

== Gallery ==
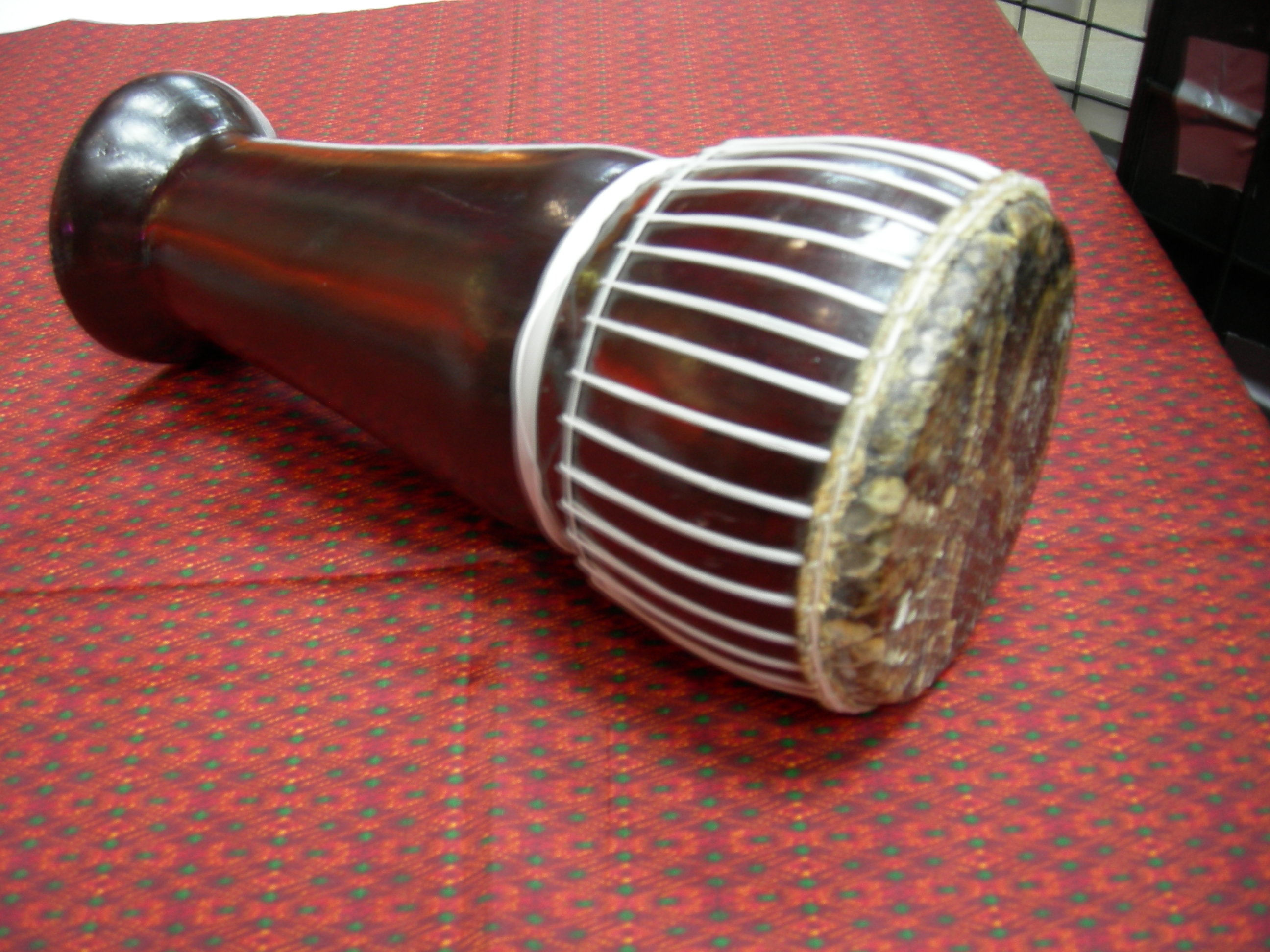
Cambodian skor daey, also known as skor arak. This is the smaller of two Cambodian goblet drums, the other being called skor chhaiyam (Khmer: ស្គរឆៃយ៉ាំ).

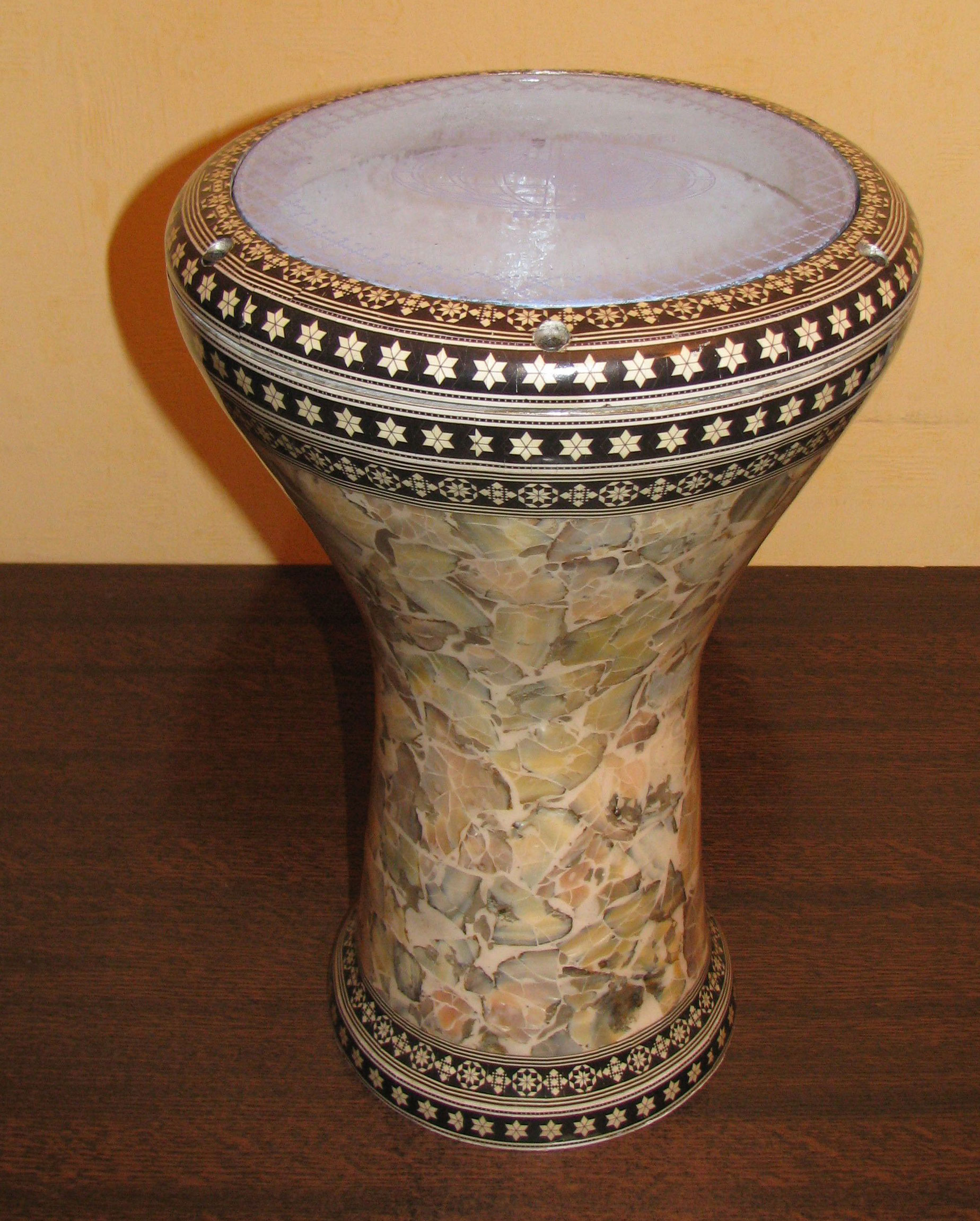
Egyptian tabla and darabuka

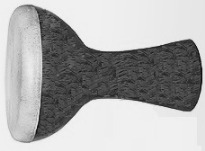
Indian tumbaknaer

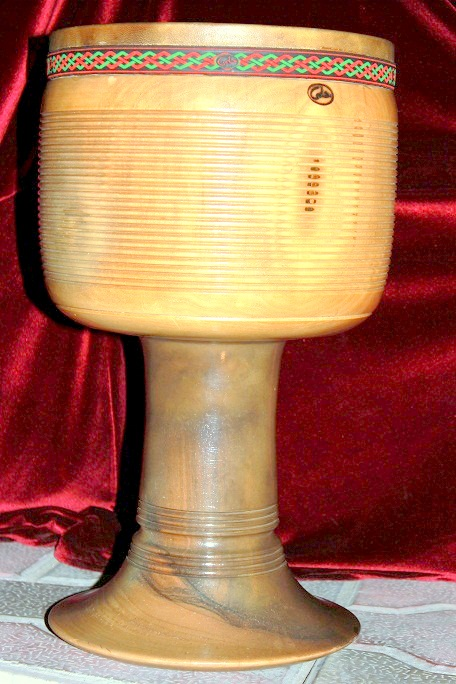
Iranian/Persian tombak or zarb

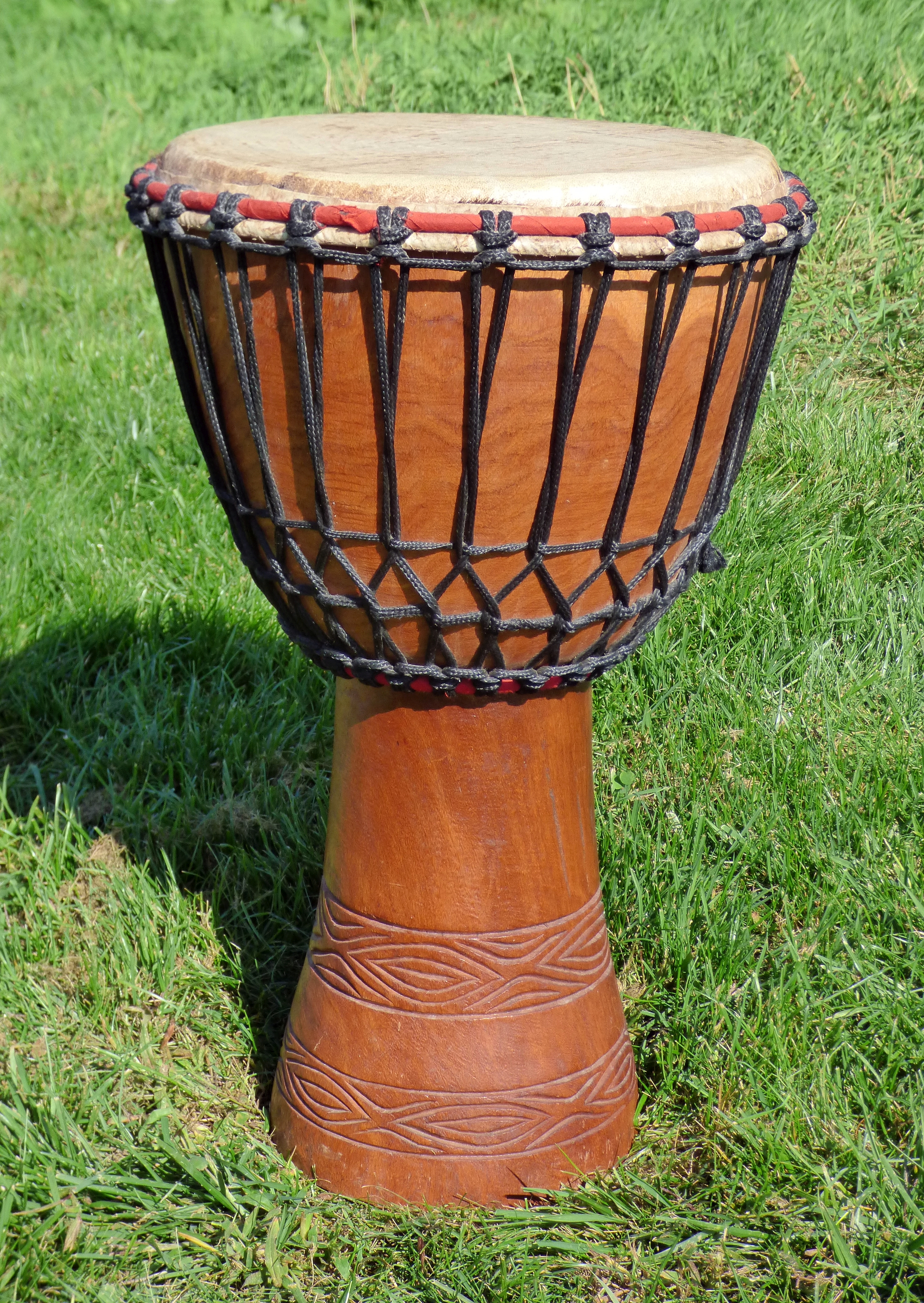
West African djembe

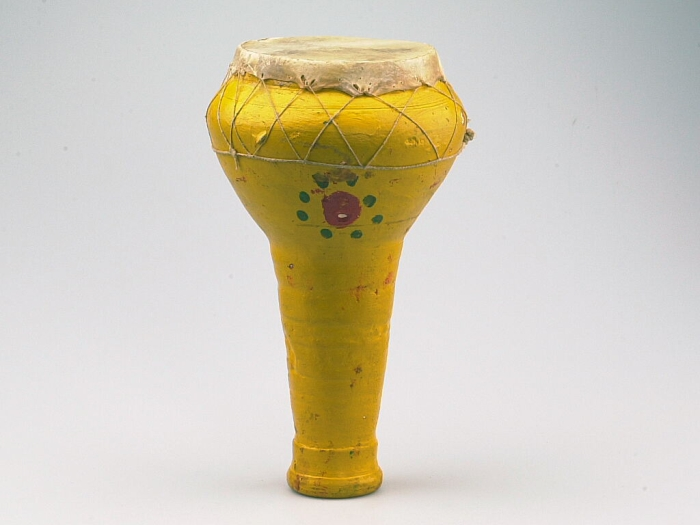
Libyan darbuka

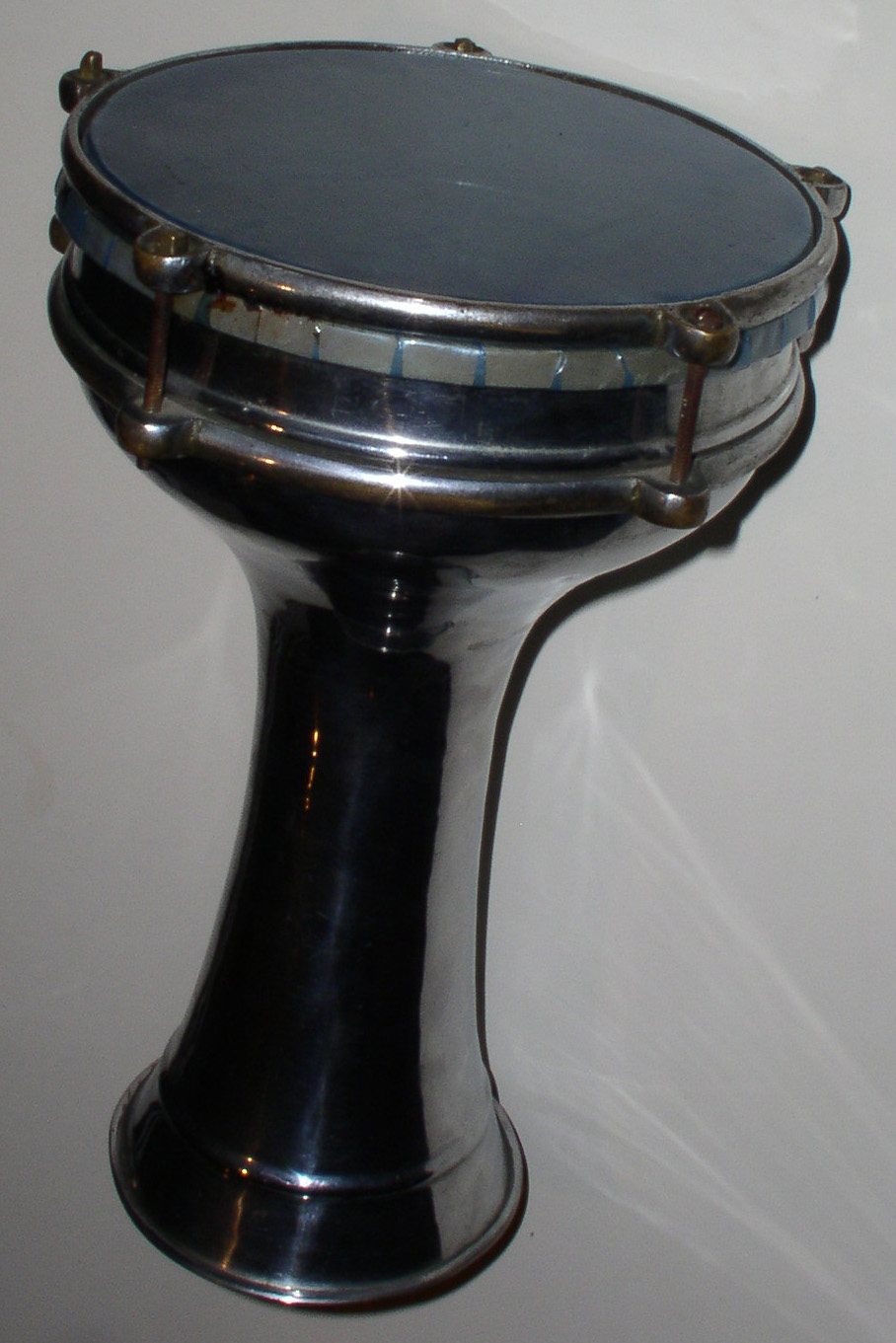
Turkish darbuka

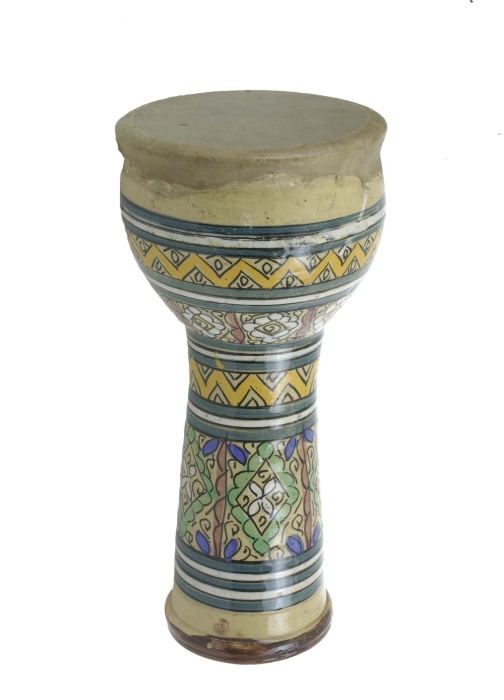
Moroccan taarija

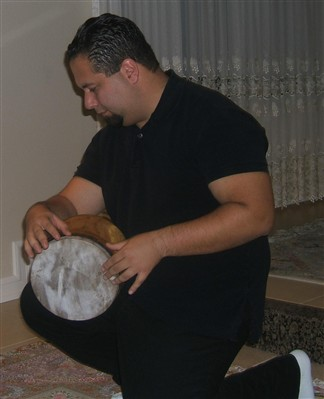
Man playing a tombak

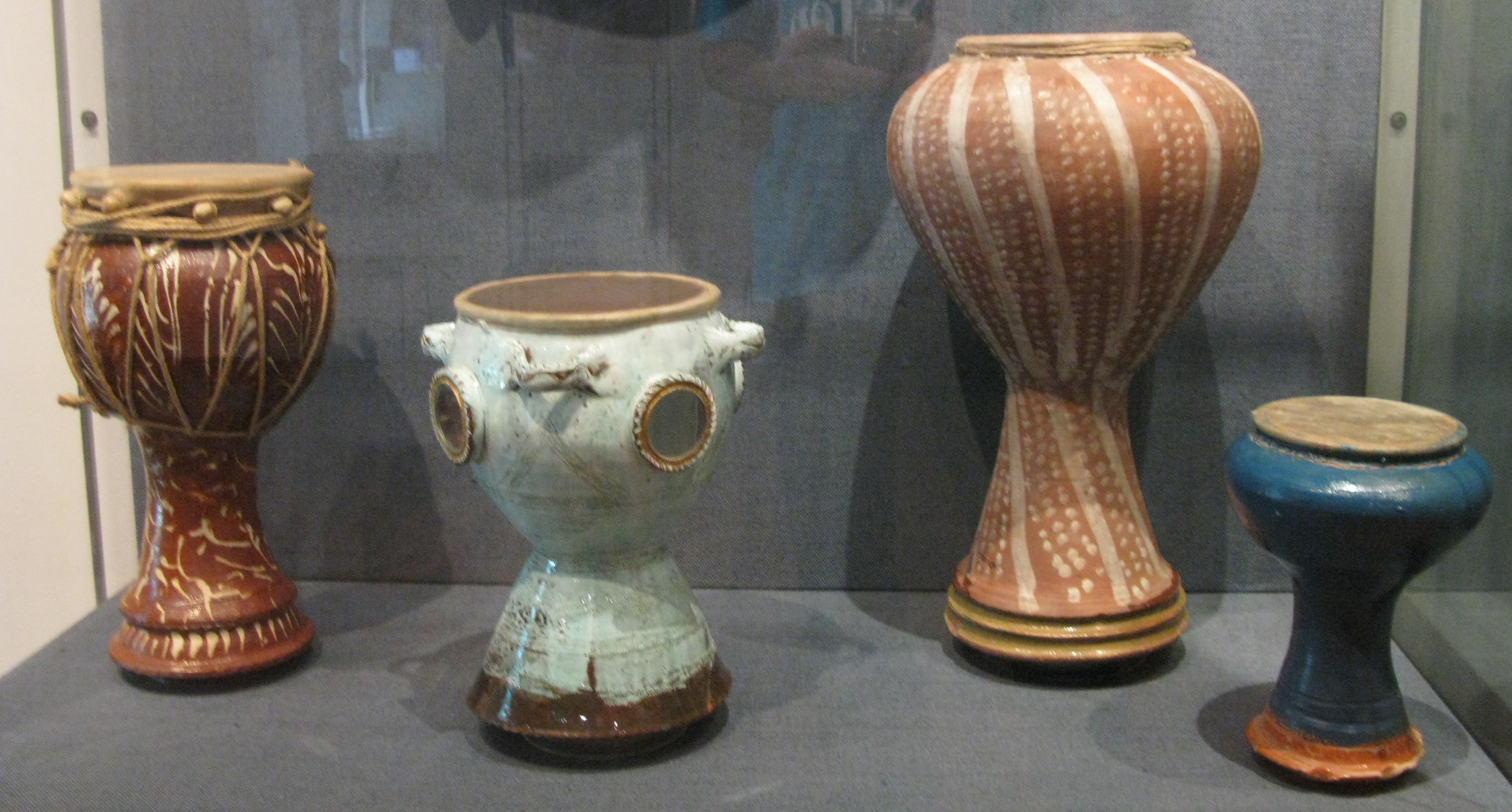
TOYMBELEKI Museum of Popular Instruments, Research Centre for Ethnomusicology. In Plaka, Athens, Greece.

== See also ==
- Ashiko
- Duhulla
- Taarija
- Tonbak
- Toubeleki
