= Skor chhaiyam =

Cambodian goblet drum

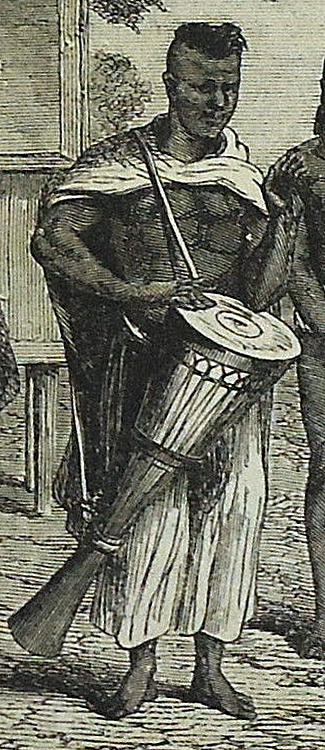
Skor chhaiyam in a 1892 engraving

Skor chhaiyam (Khmer: ស្គរឆៃយ៉ាំ) is a tall Cambodian goblet drum, slung over the shoulder with a string, so it can be played at waist level while walking. Only the top has skin, leaving a sound-hole at the bottom of a narrowed drum body. The instrument is used to "celebrate happy events."

There are 4-5 varieties of sklor chhaiyam, designed for different volume levels (quiet or loud).

== See also ==
- Music of Cambodia
