= Krom Ngoy =

Cambodian poet and musician (1865–1936)

- ក្រម ង៉ុយ
- Born: Ouk Ou (អ៊ុក អ៊ូ); 1865; Ang Snuol, French Cambodia
- Died: 1936 (aged 70–71); Phnom Penh, Cambodia, French Indochina
- Other names: Neak Preah Phirum Pheasa Ou; Phirum Ngoy
- Occupation: Poet
- Children: 6

Krom Ngoy (born Ouk Ou; 1865 – 1936) was a Cambodian poet and musician who played the khsae diev (musical bow).

He was educated as a Buddhist monk and was a traveling bard of the late 19th and 20th centuries, known as a poet of the people. He also served in the court of King Sisowath as the official singer of the royal orchestra.

His writings on poetry have been published by the Buddhist Institute.

He died at the age of 71 in 1936.
