= The Rite of Spring =

1913 ballet by Igor Stravinsky

Le Sacre du printemps The Rite of Spring
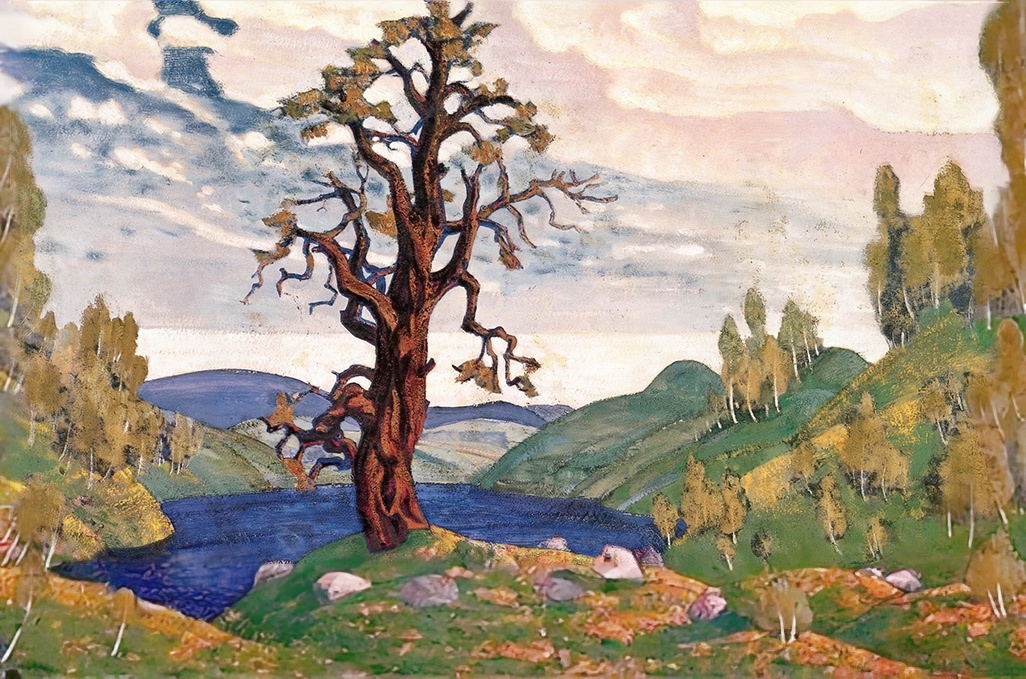
- Concept design from Diaghilev's 1913 production
- Native title: Russian: Весна священная, romanized: Vesna svyashchennaya, lit. 'Sacred Spring'
- Choreographer: Vaslav Nijinsky
- Music: Igor Stravinsky
- Based on: Pagan myths
- Premiere: 29 May 1913; Théâtre des Champs-Élysées; Paris
- Original ballet company: Ballets Russes
- Design: Nicholas Roerich

The Rite of Spring (Note: Russian: Весна священная, romanized: Vesna svyashchennaya, lit. 'sacred spring'. Full name: The Rite of Spring: Pictures from Pagan Russia in Two Parts (French: Le Sacre du printemps: tableaux de la Russie païenne en deux parties)) (French: Le Sacre du printemps) is a ballet and orchestral concert work by the Russian composer Igor Stravinsky. It was written for the 1913 Paris season of Sergei Diaghilev's Ballets Russes company; the original choreography was by Vaslav Nijinsky with stage designs and costumes by Nicholas Roerich. When first performed at the Théâtre des Champs-Élysées on 29 May 1913, the avant-garde nature of the music and choreography caused a sensation. Many have called the first-night reaction a "riot" or "near-riot", though this wording did not come about until reviews of later performances in 1924, over a decade later. Although designed as a work for the stage, with specific passages accompanying characters and action, the music achieved equal if not greater recognition as a concert piece and is widely considered to be one of the most influential musical works of the 20th century.

Stravinsky was a young, virtually unknown composer when Diaghilev recruited him to create works for the Ballets Russes. Le Sacre du printemps was the third such major project, after the acclaimed Firebird (1910) and Petrushka (1911). (Note: Though The Firebird was their first major project, Stravinsky's first collaboration with Diaghilev was creating new orchestrations for two pieces in a 1909 version of Les Sylphides.) The concept behind The Rite of Spring, developed by Roerich from Stravinsky's outline idea, is suggested by its subtitle, "Pictures of Pagan Russia in Two Parts"; the scenario depicts various primitive rituals celebrating the advent of spring, after which a young girl is chosen as a sacrificial victim and dances herself to death. After a mixed critical reception for its original run and a short London tour, the ballet was not performed again until the 1920s, when a version choreographed by Léonide Massine replaced Nijinsky's original, which saw only eight performances. Massine's was the forerunner of many innovative productions directed by the world's leading choreographers, gaining the work worldwide acceptance. In the 1980s, Nijinsky's original choreography, long believed lost, was reconstructed by the Joffrey Ballet in Los Angeles.

Stravinsky's score contains many novel features for its time, including experiments in tonality, metre, rhythm, stress and dissonance. Analysts have noted in the score a significant grounding in Russian folk music, a relationship Stravinsky tended to deny. Regarded as among the first modernist works, the music influenced many of the 20th century's leading composers and is one of the most recorded works in the classical repertoire.

== Background ==
Igor Stravinsky was the son of Fyodor Stravinsky, the principal bass singer at the Imperial Opera, Saint Petersburg, and Anna, née Kholodovskaya, a competent amateur singer and pianist from an old-established Russian family. Fyodor's association with many of the leading figures in Russian music, including Rimsky-Korsakov, Borodin and Mussorgsky, meant that Igor grew up in an intensely musical home. In 1901 Stravinsky began to study law at Saint Petersburg University while taking private lessons in harmony and counterpoint. Stravinsky worked under the guidance of Rimsky-Korsakov, having impressed him with some of his early compositional efforts. By the time of his mentor's death in 1908, Stravinsky had produced several works, among them a Piano Sonata in F♯ minor (1903–04), a Symphony in E♭ major (1907), which he catalogued as "Opus 1", and a short orchestral piece, Feu d'artifice ("Fireworks", composed in 1908).

Stravinsky, sketched by Picasso, 1920

In 1909 Feu d'artifice was performed at a concert in Saint Petersburg. Among those in the audience was the impresario Sergei Diaghilev, who at that time was planning to introduce Russian music and art to western audiences. Like Stravinsky, Diaghilev had initially studied law, but had gravitated via journalism into the theatrical world. In 1907 he began his theatrical career by presenting five concerts in Paris; in the following year he introduced Mussorgsky's opera Boris Godunov. In 1909, still in Paris, he launched the Ballets Russes, initially with Borodin's Polovtsian Dances from Prince Igor and Rimsky-Korsakov's Scheherazade. To present these works Diaghilev recruited the choreographer Michel Fokine, the designer Léon Bakst and the dancer Vaslav Nijinsky. Diaghilev's intention, however, was to produce new works in a distinctively 20th-century style, and he was looking for fresh compositional talent. Having heard Feu d'artifice he approached Stravinsky, initially with a request for help in orchestrating music by Chopin to create new arrangements for the ballet Les Sylphides. Stravinsky worked on the opening Nocturne in A-flat major and the closing Grande valse brillante; his reward was a much bigger commission, to write the music for a new ballet, The Firebird (L'oiseau de feu) for the 1910 season.

Stravinsky worked through the winter of 1909–10, in close association with Fokine who was choreographing The Firebird. During this period Stravinsky made the acquaintance of Nijinsky who, although not dancing in the ballet, was a keen observer of its development. Stravinsky was uncomplimentary when recording his first impressions of the dancer, observing that he seemed immature and gauche for his age (he was 21). On the other hand, Stravinsky found Diaghilev an inspiration, "the very essence of a great personality". The Firebird was premiered on 25 June 1910, with Tamara Karsavina in the main role, and was a great public success. This ensured that the Diaghilev–Stravinsky collaboration would continue, in the first instance with Petrushka (1911) and then The Rite of Spring.

== Synopsis and structure ==
In a note to the conductor Serge Koussevitzky in February 1914, Stravinsky described Le Sacre du printemps as "a musical-choreographic work, [representing] pagan Russia ... unified by a single idea: the mystery and great surge of the creative power of Spring". In his analysis of The Rite, Pieter van den Toorn writes that the work lacks a specific plot or narrative, and should be considered as a succession of choreographed episodes.

The French titles are given in the form as written in the four-part piano score published in 1913. There have been numerous variants of the English translations; those shown are from the 1967 edition of the score.

Synopsis and structure
Episode	English translation	Synopsis (Note: Except as indicated by a specific citation, the synopsis information is taken from Stravinsky's February 1914 note to Koussevitsky.)
Part I: L'Adoration de la Terre (Adoration of the Earth)
Introduction	Introduction	Before the curtain rises, an orchestral introduction resembles, according to Stravinsky, "a swarm of spring pipes [dudki]"
Les Augures printaniers	Augurs of Spring	The celebration of spring begins in the hills. A 300-year-old woman enters and begins to foretell the future.
Jeu du rapt	Ritual of Abduction	Young girls arrive from the river, in single file. They begin the "Dance of the Abduction".
Rondes printanières	Spring Rounds	The young girls dance the Khorovod, the "Spring Rounds".
Jeux des cités rivales	Ritual of the Rival Tribes	The people divide into two groups in opposition to each other, and begin the "Ritual of the Rival Tribes".
Cortège du sage: Le Sage	Procession of the Sage: The Sage	A holy procession leads to the entry of the wise elders, headed by the Sage who brings the games to a pause and blesses the earth. (Note: In many early editions of the score, the closing section of this episode, in which the Sage blesses the earth, is separated into its own piece, either called "Embrasse de la terre" (The Kiss of the Earth), or "Le sage" (The Sage).)
Danse de la terre	Dance of the Earth	The people break into a passionate dance, sanctifying and becoming one with the earth.
Part II: Le Sacrifice (The Sacrifice)
Introduction	Introduction	
Cercles mystérieux des adolescentes	Mystic Circles of the Young Girls	The young girls engage in mysterious games, walking in circles.
Glorification de l'élue	Glorification of the Chosen One	One of the young girls is selected by fate, being twice caught in the perpetual circle, and is honoured as the "Chosen One" with a forceful dance.
Évocation des ancêtres	Evocation of the Ancestors	In a brief dance, the young girls invoke the ancestors.
Action rituelle des ancêtres	Ritual Action of the Ancestors	The Chosen One is entrusted to the care of the old wise men.
Danse sacrale (L'Élue)	Sacrificial Dance (The Chosen One)	The Chosen One dances to death in the presence of the old men, in the great "Sacrificial Dance".

== Creation ==
=== Conception ===
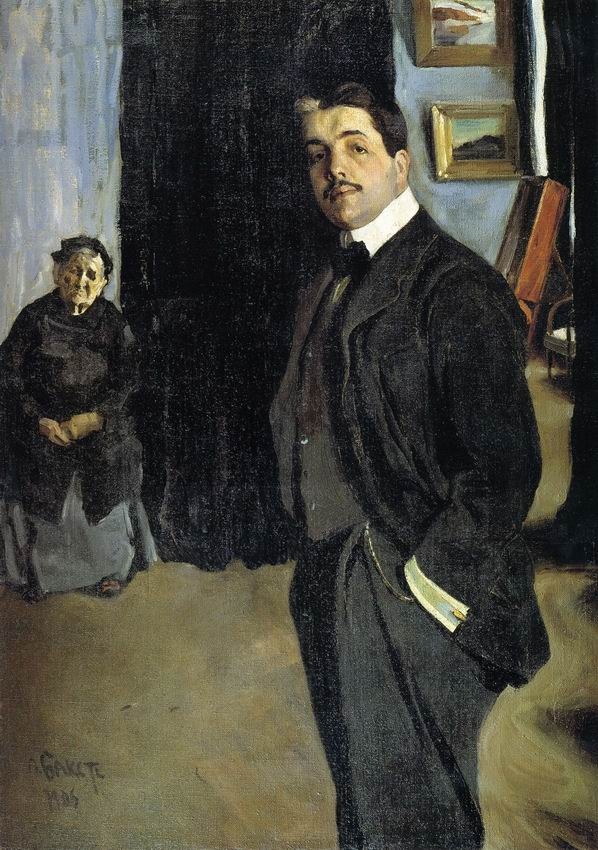
Sergei Diaghilev, director of the Ballets Russes from 1909 to 1929, as painted by Léon Bakst

Lawrence Morton, in a study of the origins of The Rite, records that in 1907–08 Stravinsky set to music two poems from Sergey Gorodetsky's collection Yar. Another poem in the anthology, which Stravinsky did not set but is likely to have read, is "Yarila" which, Morton observes, contains many of the basic elements from which The Rite of Spring developed, including pagan rites, sage elders, and the propitiatory sacrifice of a young maiden: "The likeness is too close to be coincidental". Stravinsky himself gave contradictory accounts of the genesis of The Rite. In a 1920 article he stressed that the musical ideas had come first, that the pagan setting had been suggested by the music rather than the other way round. However, in his 1936 autobiography he described the origin of the work thus: "One day [in 1910], when I was finishing the last pages of L'Oiseau de Feu in Saint Petersburg, I had a fleeting vision ... I saw in my imagination a solemn pagan rite: sage elders, seated in a circle, watching a young girl dance herself to death. They were sacrificing her to propitiate the god of Spring. Such was the theme of the Sacre du printemps."

By May 1910 Stravinsky was discussing his idea with Nicholas Roerich, the foremost Russian expert on folk art and ancient rituals. Roerich had a reputation as an artist and mystic, and had provided the stage designs for Diaghilev's 1909 production of the Polovtsian Dances. The pair quickly agreed on a working title, "The Great Sacrifice" (Russian: Velikaia zhertva); Diaghilev gave his blessing to the work, although the collaboration was put on hold for a year while Stravinsky was occupied with his second major commission for Diaghilev, the ballet Petrushka.

In July 1911 Stravinsky visited Talashkino, near Smolensk, where Roerich was staying with the Princess Maria Tenisheva, a noted patron of the arts and a sponsor of Diaghilev's magazine World of Art. Here, over several days, Stravinsky and Roerich finalised the structure of the ballet. Thomas F. Kelly, in his history of the Rite premiere, suggests that the two-part pagan scenario that emerged was primarily devised by Roerich. Stravinsky later explained to Nikolai Findeyzen, the editor of the Russian Musical Gazette, that the first part of the work would be called "The Kiss of the Earth", and would consist of games and ritual dances interrupted by a procession of sages, culminating in a frenzied dance as the people embraced the spring. Part Two, "The Sacrifice", would have a darker aspect; secret night games of maidens, leading to the choice of one for sacrifice and her eventual dance to the death before the sages. The original working title was changed to "Holy Spring" (Russian: Vesna sviashchennaia), but the work became generally known by the French translation Le Sacre du printemps, or its English equivalent The Rite of Spring, with the subtitle "Pictures of Pagan Russia".

=== Composition ===
First page from the handwritten score of Le Sacre du printemps

Stravinsky's sketchbooks show that after returning to his home at Ustilug in Ukraine in September 1911, he worked on two movements, the "Augurs of Spring" and the "Spring Rounds". In October he left Ustilug for Clarens in Switzerland, where in a tiny and sparsely-furnished room—an 8-by-8-foot (2.4 by 2.4 m) closet, with only a muted upright piano, a table and two chairs—he worked throughout the 1911–12 winter on the score. By March 1912, according to the sketchbook chronology, Stravinsky had completed Part I and had drafted much of Part II. He also prepared a two-hand piano version, subsequently lost, which he may have used to demonstrate the work to Diaghilev and the Ballets Russes conductor Pierre Monteux in April 1912. He also made a four-hand piano arrangement which became the first published version of Le Sacre; he and the composer Claude Debussy played the first half of this together, in June 1912.

Following Diaghilev's decision to delay the premiere until 1913, Stravinsky put The Rite aside during the summer of 1912. He enjoyed the Paris season, and accompanied Diaghilev to the Bayreuth Festival to attend a performance of Parsifal. Stravinsky resumed work on The Rite in the autumn; the sketchbooks indicate that he had finished the outline of the final sacrificial dance on 17 November 1912. During the remaining months of winter he worked on the full orchestral score, which he signed and dated as "completed in Clarens, March 8, 1913". He showed the manuscript to Maurice Ravel, who was enthusiastic and predicted, in a letter to a friend, that the first performance of Le Sacre would be as important as the 1902 premiere of Debussy's Pelléas et Mélisande. After the orchestral rehearsals began in late March, Monteux drew the composer's attention to several passages which were causing problems: inaudible horns, a flute solo drowned out by brass and strings, and multiple problems with the balance among instruments in the brass section during fortissimo episodes. Stravinsky amended these passages, and as late as April was still revising and rewriting the final bars of the "Sacrificial Dance". Revision of the score did not end with the version prepared for the 1913 premiere; rather, Stravinsky continued to make changes for the next 30 years or more. According to Van den Toorn, "[n]o other work of Stravinsky's underwent such a series of post-premiere revisions".

Stravinsky acknowledged that the work's opening bassoon melody was derived from an anthology of Lithuanian folk songs, but maintained that this was his only borrowing from such sources; if other elements sounded like aboriginal folk music, he said, it was due to "some unconscious 'folk' memory". However, Morton has identified several more melodies in Part I as having their origins in the Lithuanian collection. More recently Richard Taruskin discovered in the score an adapted tune from one of Rimsky-Korsakov's "One Hundred Russian National Songs". Taruskin notes the paradox whereby The Rite, generally acknowledged as the most revolutionary of the composer's early works, is in fact rooted in the traditions of Russian music.

=== Realisation ===
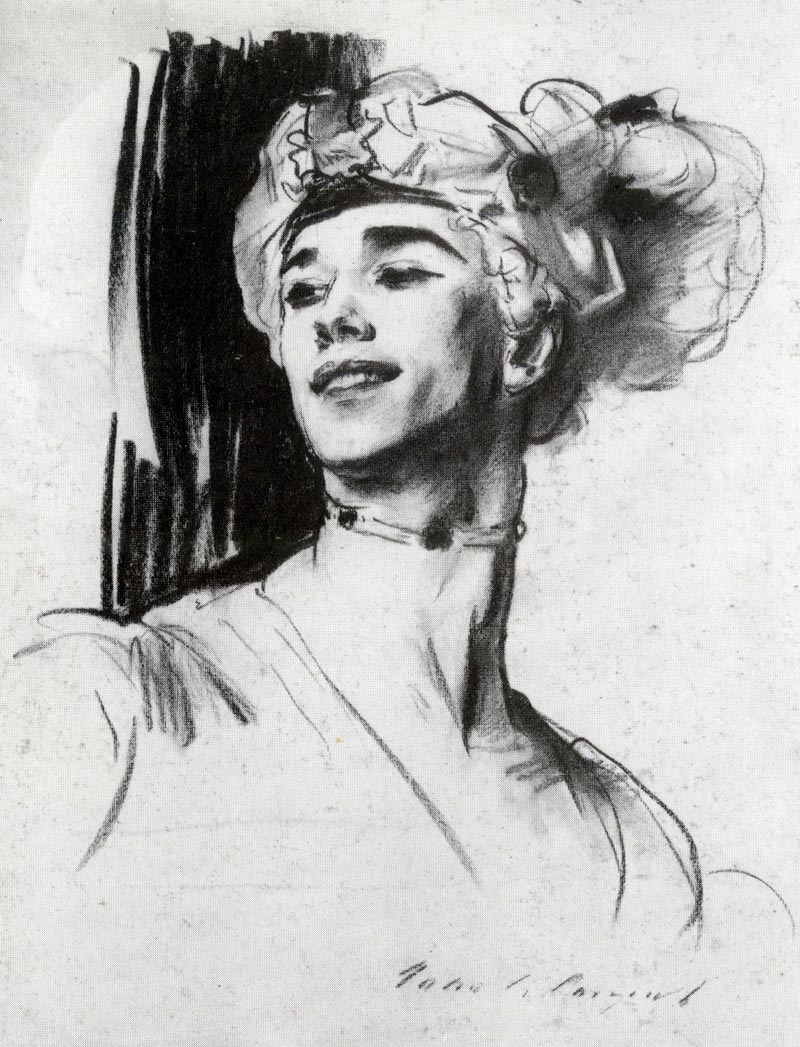
Nijinsky in 1911, depicted by John Singer Sargent in costume for his role in Nikolai Tcherepnin's ballet Le Pavillon d'Armide

Taruskin has listed a number of sources that Roerich consulted when creating his designs. Among these are the Primary Chronicle, a 12th-century compendium of early pagan customs, and Alexander Afanasyev's study of peasant folklore and pagan prehistory. The Princess Tenisheva's collection of costumes was an early source of inspiration. When the designs were complete, Stravinsky expressed delight and declared them "a real miracle".

Stravinsky's relationship with his other main collaborator, Nijinsky, was more complicated. Diaghilev had decided that Nijinsky's genius as a dancer would translate into the role of choreographer and ballet master; he was not dissuaded when Nijinsky's first attempt at choreography, Debussy's L'après-midi d'un faune, caused controversy and near-scandal because of the dancer's novel stylised movements and his overtly sexual gesture at the work's end. It is apparent from contemporary correspondence that, at least initially, Stravinsky viewed Nijinsky's talents as a choreographer with approval; a letter he sent to Findeyzen praises the dancer's "passionate zeal and complete self-effacement". However, in his 1936 memoirs Stravinsky writes that the decision to employ Nijinsky in this role filled him with apprehension; although he admired Nijinsky as a dancer he had no confidence in him as a choreographer: "the poor boy knew nothing of music. He could neither read it nor play any instrument". (Note: Nijinsky's sister Bronislava Nijinska later insisted that her brother could play a number of instruments, including the balalaika, the clarinet and the piano.) Later still, Stravinsky would ridicule Nijinsky's dancing maidens as "knock-kneed and long-braided Lolitas".

Stravinsky's autobiographical account refers to many "painful incidents" between the choreographer and the dancers during the rehearsal period. By the beginning of 1913, when Nijinsky was badly behind schedule, Stravinsky was warned by Diaghilev that "unless you come here immediately ... the Sacre will not take place". The problems were slowly overcome, and when the final rehearsals were held in May 1913, the dancers appeared to have mastered the work's difficulties. Even the Ballets Russes's sceptical stage director, Serge Grigoriev, was full of praise for the originality and dynamism of Nijinsky's choreography.

The conductor Pierre Monteux had worked with Diaghilev since 1911 and had been in charge of the orchestra at the premiere of Petrushka. Monteux's first reaction to The Rite, after hearing Stravinsky play a piano version, was to leave the room and find a quiet corner. He drew Diaghilev aside and said he would never conduct music like that; Diaghilev managed to change his mind. Although he would perform his duties with conscientious professionalism, he never came to enjoy the work; nearly fifty years after the premiere he told enquirers that he detested it. In old age he said to Sir Thomas Beecham's biographer Charles Reid: "I did not like Le Sacre then. I have conducted it fifty times since. I do not like it now". On 30 March Monteux informed Stravinsky of modifications he thought were necessary to the score, all of which the composer implemented. The orchestra, drawn mainly from the Concerts Colonne in Paris, comprised 99 players, much larger than normally employed at the theatre, and had difficulty fitting into the orchestra pit.

After the first part of the ballet received two full orchestral rehearsals in March, Monteux and the company departed to perform in Monte Carlo. Rehearsals resumed when they returned; the unusually large number of rehearsals—seventeen solely orchestral and five with the dancers—were fit into the fortnight before the opening, after Stravinsky's arrival in Paris on 13 May. The music contained so many unusual note combinations that Monteux had to ask the musicians to stop interrupting when they thought they had found mistakes in the score, saying he would tell them if something was played incorrectly. According to Doris Monteux, "The musicians thought it absolutely crazy". At one point—a climactic brass fortissimo—the orchestra broke into nervous laughter at the sound, causing Stravinsky to intervene angrily. (Note: Kelly and Walsh both cite Henri Girard, a member of the double-bass section. According to Truman Bullard, the section referred to is at the conclusion of the "Spring Rounds".)

The role of the sacrificial victim was to have been danced by Nijinsky's sister, Bronislava Nijinska; when she became pregnant during rehearsals, she was replaced by the then relatively unknown Maria Piltz.

== Performance history and reception ==
=== Premiere ===
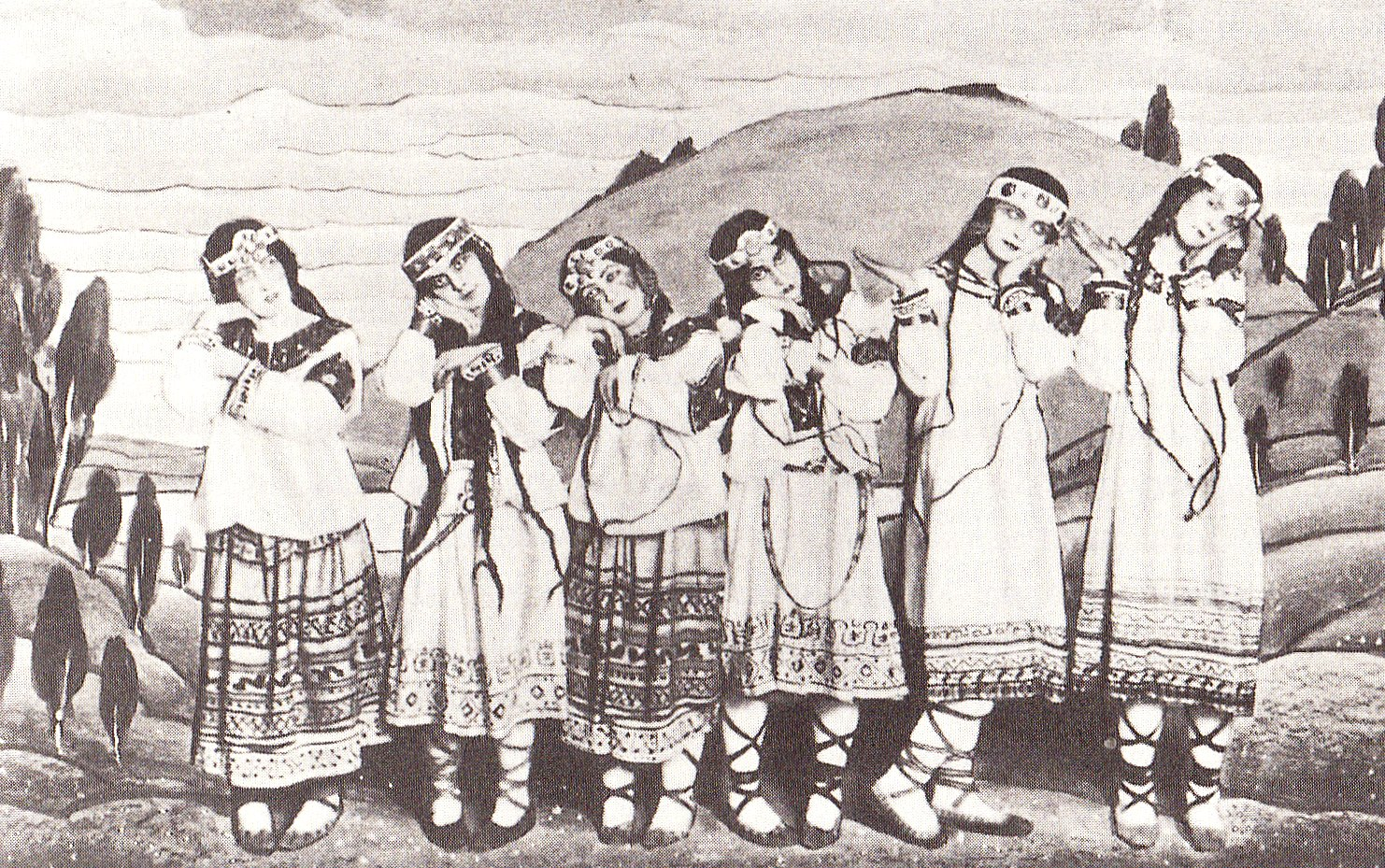
Dancers in Nicholas Roerich's original costumes. From left, Julitska, Marie Rambert, Jejerska, Boni, Boniecka, Faithful

Paris's Théâtre des Champs-Élysées was a new structure, which had opened on 2 April 1913 with a programme celebrating the works of many of the leading composers of the day. The theatre's manager, Gabriel Astruc, was determined to house the 1913 Ballets Russes season, and paid Diaghilev the large sum of 25,000 francs per performance, double what he had paid the previous year. The programme for 29 May 1913, as well as the Stravinsky premiere, included Les Sylphides, Weber's Le Spectre de la Rose and Borodin's Polovtsian Dances. Ticket sales for the evening, ticket prices being doubled for a premiere, amounted to 35,000 francs. A dress rehearsal was held in the presence of members of the press and assorted invited guests. According to Stravinsky, all went peacefully. However, the critic of L'Écho de Paris, Adolphe Boschot, foresaw possible trouble; he wondered how the public would receive the work, and suggested that they might react badly if they thought they were being mocked.

On the evening of 29 May, Gustav Linor reported, "Never ... has the hall been so full, or so resplendent; the stairways and the corridors were crowded with spectators eager to see and to hear". The evening began with Les Sylphides, in which Nijinsky and Karsavina danced the main roles. Le Sacre followed. Some eyewitnesses and commentators said that the disturbances in the audience began during the Introduction, and grew noisier when the curtain rose on the stamping dancers in "Augurs of Spring". But Taruskin asserts, "it was not Stravinsky's music that did the shocking. It was the ugly earthbound lurching and stomping devised by Vaslav Nijinsky." Marie Rambert, who was working as an assistant to Nijinsky, recalled later that it was soon impossible to hear the music on the stage. In his autobiography, Stravinsky writes that the derisive laughter that greeted the first bars of the Introduction disgusted him, and that he left the auditorium to watch the rest of the performance from the stage wings. The demonstrations, he says, grew into "a terrific uproar" which, along with the on-stage noises, drowned out the voice of Nijinsky who was shouting the step numbers to the dancers. Two years after the premiere the journalist and photographer Carl Van Vechten claimed in his book Music After the Great War that the person behind him became carried away with excitement, and "began to beat rhythmically on top of my head with his fists". In 1916, in a letter not published until 2013, Van Vechten admitted he had actually attended the second night, among other changes of fact.

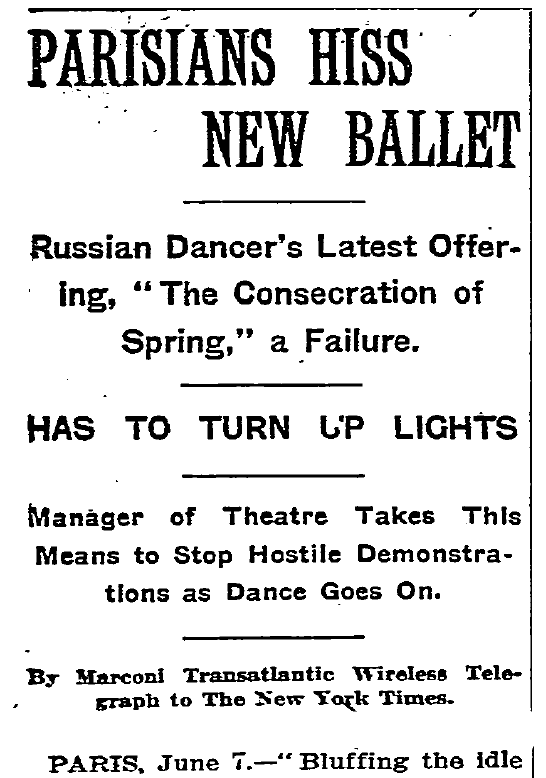
The New York Times reported the sensational premiere, nine days after the event.

At that time, a Parisian ballet audience typically consisted of two diverse groups: the wealthy and fashionable set, who would be expecting to see a traditional performance with beautiful music, and a "Bohemian" group who, the poet-philosopher Jean Cocteau asserted, would "acclaim, right or wrong, anything that is new because of their hatred of the boxes". Monteux believed that the trouble began when the two factions began attacking each other, but their mutual anger was soon diverted towards the orchestra: "Everything available was tossed in our direction, but we continued to play on". Around forty of the worst offenders were ejected—possibly with the intervention of the police, although this is uncorroborated. Through all the disturbances the performance continued without interruption. The unrest receded significantly during Part II, and by some accounts Maria Piltz's rendering of the final "Sacrificial Dance" was watched in reasonable silence. At the end there were several curtain calls for the dancers, for Monteux and the orchestra, and for Stravinsky and Nijinsky before the evening's programme continued.

Among the more hostile press reviews was that of Le Figaro's critic Henri Quittard, who called the work "a laborious and puerile barbarity" and added "We are sorry to see an artist such as M. Stravinsky involve himself in this disconcerting adventure". On the other hand, Gustav Linor, writing in the leading theatrical magazine Comœdia, thought the performance was superb, especially that of Maria Piltz; the disturbances, while deplorable, were merely "a rowdy debate" between two ill-mannered factions. Emile Raudin, of Les Marges, who had barely heard the music, wrote: "Couldn't we ask M. Astruc ... to set aside one performance for well-intentioned spectators? ... We could at least propose to evict the female element". The composer Alfredo Casella thought that the demonstrations were aimed at Nijinsky's choreography rather than at the music, a view shared by the critic Michel-Dimitri Calvocoressi, who wrote: "The idea was excellent, but was not successfully carried out". Calvocoressi failed to observe any direct hostility to the composer—unlike, he said, the premiere of Debussy's Pelléas et Mélisande in 1902. Of later reports that the veteran composer Camille Saint-Saëns had stormed out of the premiere, Stravinsky observed that this was impossible; Saint-Saëns did not attend. (Note: Monteux's biographer records that Saint-Saëns walked out of the Paris premiere of the concert version of The Rite, which Monteux conducted in April 1914; Saint-Saëns opined that Stravinsky was "mad".) Stravinsky also rejected Cocteau's story that, after the performance, Stravinsky, Nijinsky, Diaghilev and Cocteau himself took a cab to the Bois de Boulogne where a tearful Diaghilev recited poems by Pushkin. Stravinsky merely recalled a celebratory dinner with Diaghilev and Nijinsky, at which the impresario expressed his entire satisfaction with the outcome. To Maximilien Steinberg, a former fellow-pupil under Rimsky-Korsakov, Stravinsky wrote that Nijinsky's choreography had been "incomparable: with the exception of a few places, everything was as I wanted it".

=== Initial run and early revivals ===
The premiere was followed by five further performances of Le Sacre du printemps at the Théâtre des Champs-Élysées, the last on 13 June. Although these occasions were relatively peaceful, something of the mood of the first night remained; the composer Giacomo Puccini, who attended the second performance on 2 June, described the choreography as ridiculous and the music cacophonous—"the work of a madman. The public hissed, laughed—and applauded". Stravinsky, confined to his bed by typhoid fever, did not join the company when it went to London for four performances at the Theatre Royal, Drury Lane. Reviewing the London production, The Times critic was impressed how different elements of the work came together to form a coherent whole, but was less enthusiastic about the music itself, opining that Stravinsky had entirely sacrificed melody and harmony for rhythm: "If M. Stravinsky had wished to be really primitive, he would have been wise to ... score his ballet for nothing but drums". The ballet historian Cyril Beaumont commented on the "slow, uncouth movements" of the dancers, finding these "in complete opposition to the traditions of classical ballet".

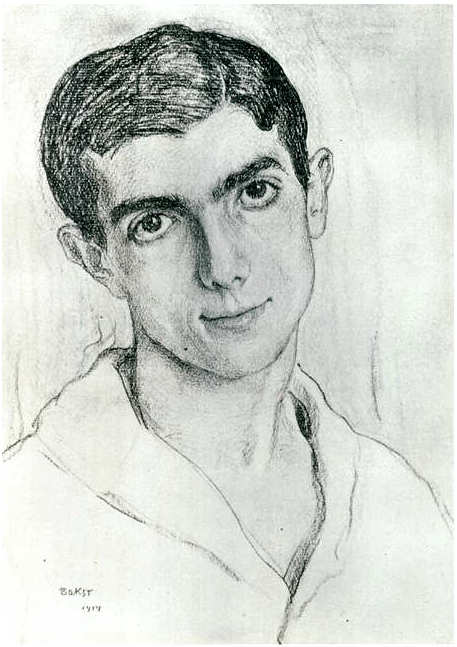
Léonide Massine, who choreographed the 1920 revival

After the opening Paris run and the London performances, events conspired to prevent further stagings of the ballet. Nijinsky's choreography, which Kelly describes as "so striking, so outrageous, so frail as to its preservation", did not appear again until attempts were made to reconstruct it in the 1980s. On 19 September 1913 Nijinsky married Romola de Pulszky while the Ballets Russes was on tour without Diaghilev in South America. When Diaghilev found out he was distraught and furious that his lover had married, and dismissed Nijinsky. Diaghilev was then obliged to re-hire Fokine, who had resigned in 1912 because Nijinsky had been asked to choreograph Faune. Fokine made it a condition of his re-employment that none of Nijinsky's choreography would be performed. In a letter to the art critic and historian Alexandre Benois, Stravinsky wrote, "[T]he possibility has gone for some time of seeing anything valuable in the field of dance and, still more important, of again seeing this offspring of mine".

With the disruption following the outbreak of the First World War in August 1914 and the dispersal of many artistes, Diaghilev was ready to re-engage Nijinsky as both dancer and choreographer, but Nijinsky had been placed under house arrest in Hungary as an enemy Russian citizen. Diaghilev negotiated his release in 1916 for a tour in the United States, but the dancer's mental health steadily declined and he took no further part in professional ballet after 1917. In 1920, when Diaghilev decided to revive The Rite, he found that no one now remembered the choreography. After spending most of the war years in Switzerland, and becoming a permanent exile from his homeland after the 1917 Russian Revolution, Stravinsky resumed his partnership with Diaghilev when the war ended. In December 1920 Ernest Ansermet conducted a new production in Paris, choreographed by Léonide Massine, with the Nicholas Roerich designs retained; the lead dancer was Lydia Sokolova. In his memoirs, Stravinsky is equivocal about the Massine production; the young choreographer, he writes, showed "unquestionable talent", but there was something "forced and artificial" in his choreography, which lacked the necessary organic relationship with the music. Sokolova, in her later account, recalled some of the tensions surrounding the production, with Stravinsky, "wearing an expression that would have frightened a hundred Chosen Virgins, pranc[ing] up and down the centre aisle" while Ansermet rehearsed the orchestra.

=== Later choreographies ===
The ballet was first shown in the United States on 11 April 1930, when Massine's 1920 version was performed by the Philadelphia Orchestra in Philadelphia under Leopold Stokowski, with Martha Graham dancing the role of the Chosen One. The production moved to New York, where Massine was relieved to find the audiences receptive, a sign, he thought, that New Yorkers were finally beginning to take ballet seriously. The first American-designed production, in 1937, was that of the modern dance exponent Lester Horton, whose version replaced the original pagan Russian setting with a Wild West background and the use of Native American dances.

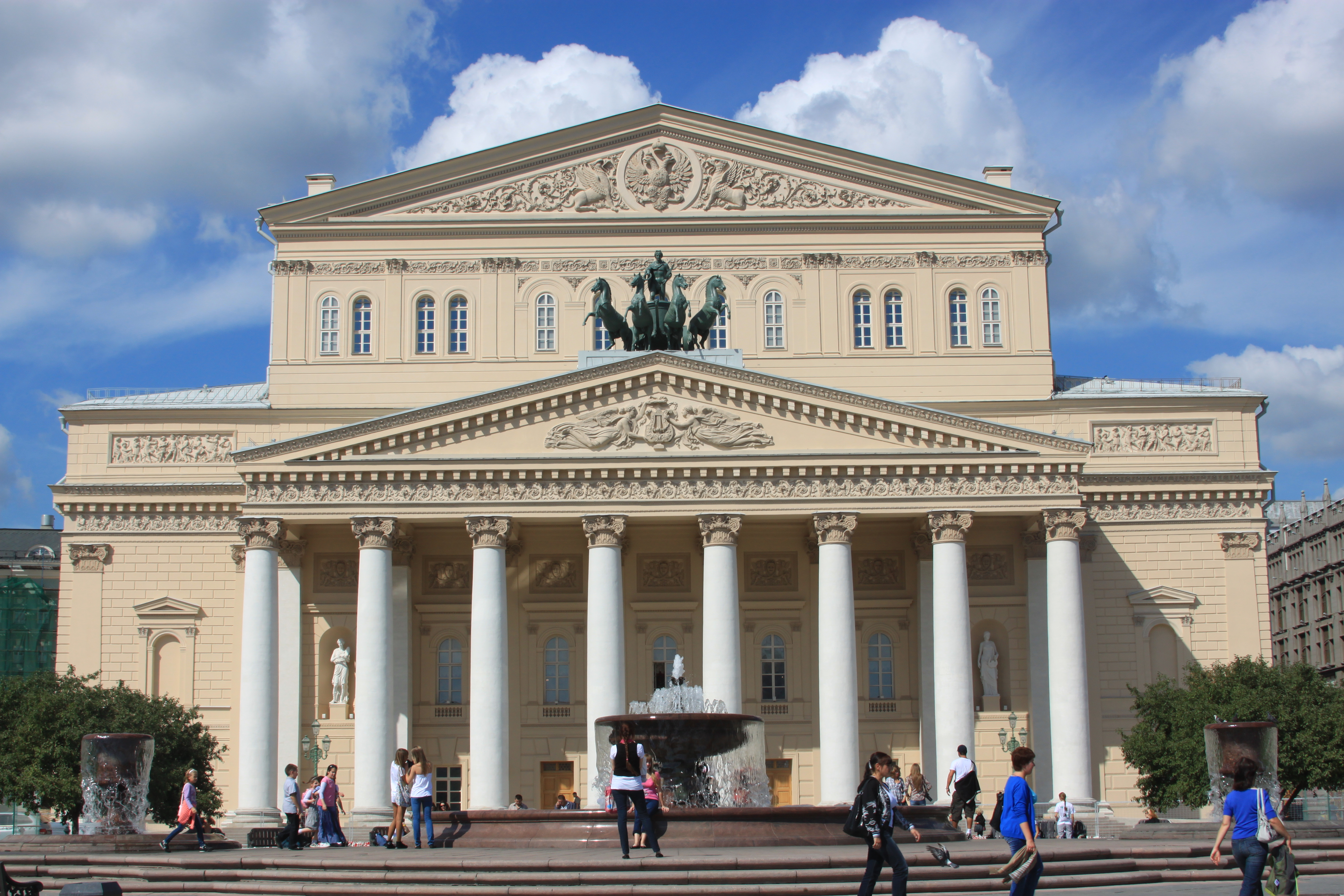
The Bolshoi Theatre in Moscow, where the 1965 production of The Rite was described by a critic as "Soviet propaganda at its best"

In 1944 Massine began a new collaboration with Roerich, who before his death in 1947 completed a number of sketches for a new production which Massine brought to fruition at La Scala in Milan in 1948. This heralded a number of significant post-war European productions. Mary Wigman in Berlin (1957) followed Horton in highlighting the erotic aspects of virgin sacrifice, as did Maurice Béjart in Brussels (1959). Béjart's representation replaced the culminating sacrifice with a depiction of what the critic Robert Johnson describes as "ceremonial coitus". The Royal Ballet's 1962 production, choreographed by Kenneth MacMillan and designed by Sidney Nolan, was first performed on 3 May and was a critical triumph. It has remained in the company's repertoire for more than 50 years; after its revival in May 2011 The Daily Telegraph's critic Mark Monahan called it one of the Royal Ballet's greatest achievements. Moscow first saw The Rite in 1965, in a version choreographed for the Bolshoi Ballet by Natalia Kasatkina and Vladimir Vasiliev. This production was shown in Leningrad four years later, at the Maly Opera Theatre, and introduced a storyline that provided the Chosen One with a lover who wreaks vengeance on the elders after the sacrifice. Johnson describes the production as "a product of state atheism ... Soviet propaganda at its best".

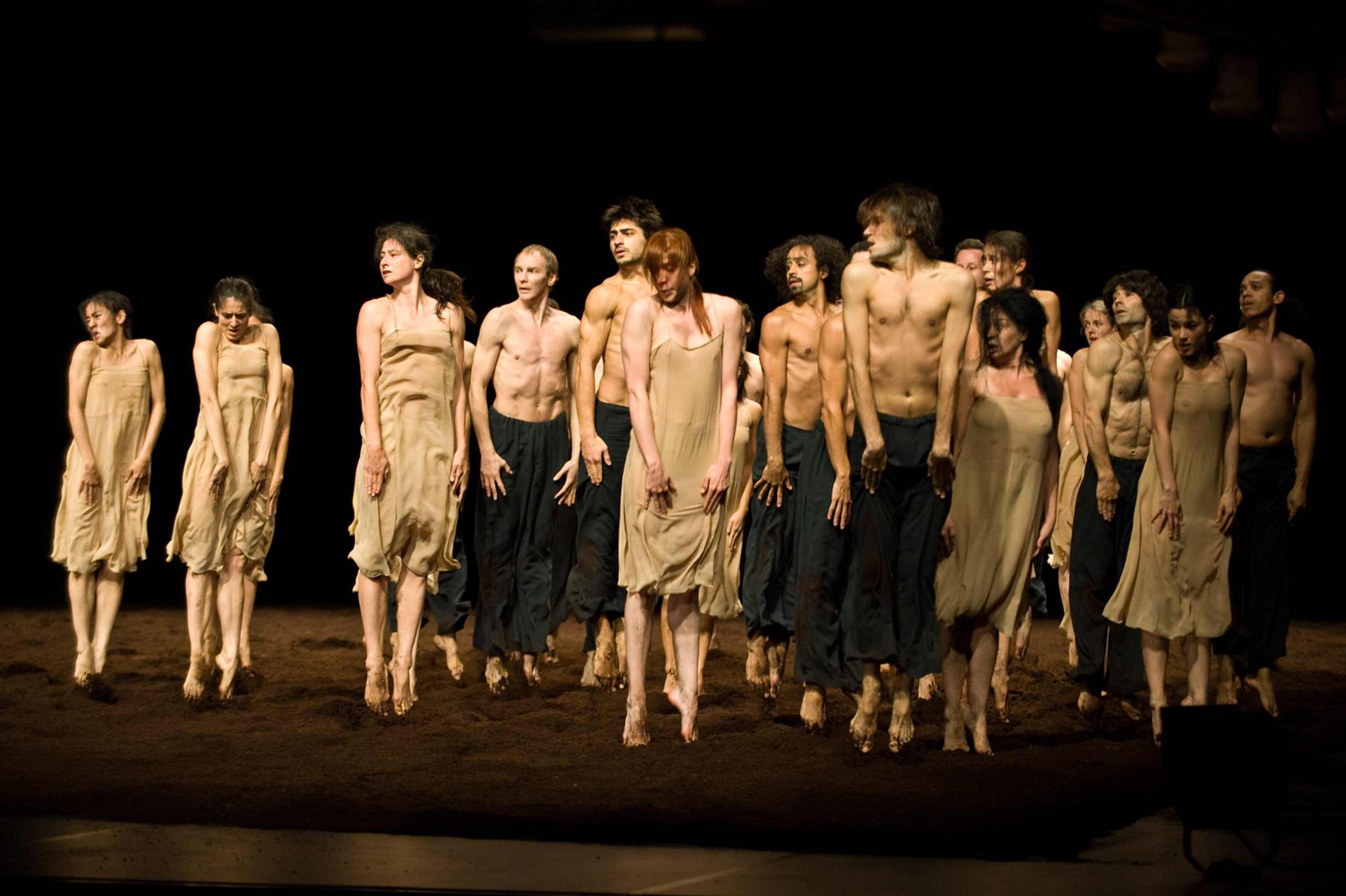
Tanztheater Wuppertal in Pina Bausch's production

In 1975 modern dance choreographer Pina Bausch, who transformed the Ballett der Wuppertaler Bühnen to Tanztheater Wuppertal, caused a stir in the dance world with her stark depiction, played out on an earth-covered stage, in which the Chosen One is sacrificed to gratify the misogyny of the surrounding men. At the end, according to The Guardian's Luke Jennings, "the cast is sweat-streaked, filthy and audibly panting". Part of this dance appears in the film Pina. Bausch's version had also been danced by two ballet companies, the Paris Opera Ballet and English National Ballet. In America, in 1980, Paul Taylor used Stravinsky's four-hand piano version of the score as the background for a scenario based on child murder and gangster film images. In February 1984 Martha Graham, in her 90th year, resumed her association with The Rite by choreographing a new production at New York State Theater. The New York Times critic declared the performance "a triumph ... totally elemental, as primal in expression of basic emotion as any tribal ceremony, as hauntingly staged in its deliberate bleakness as it is rich in implication".

On 30 September 1987, the Joffrey Ballet performed in Los Angeles The Rite based on a reconstruction of Nijinsky's 1913 choreography, until then thought lost beyond recall. The performance resulted from years of research, primarily by Millicent Hodson, who pieced the choreography together from the original prompt books, contemporary sketches and photographs, and the recollections of Marie Rambert and other survivors. Hodson's version has since been performed by the Kirov Ballet, at the Mariinsky Theatre in 2003 and later that year at Covent Garden. In its 2012–13 season the Joffrey Ballet gave centennial performances at numerous venues, including the University of Texas, the University of Massachusetts, and with the Cleveland Orchestra.

The music publishers Boosey & Hawkes have estimated that since its premiere, the ballet has been the subject of at least 150 productions, many of which have become classics and have been performed worldwide. Among the more radical interpretations is Glen Tetley's 1974 version, in which the Chosen One is a young male. More recently there have been solo dance versions devised by Molissa Fenley and Javier de Frutos and a punk rock interpretation from Michael Clark. The 2004 film Rhythm Is It! documents a project by conductor Simon Rattle with the Berlin Philharmonic and choreographer Royston Maldoom to stage a performance of the ballet with a cast of 250 children recruited from Berlin's public schools, from 25 countries. In Rites (2008), by The Australian Ballet in conjunction with Bangarra Dance Theatre, Aboriginal perceptions of the elements of earth, air, fire and water are featured.

=== Concert performances ===
On 18 February 1914 The Rite received its first concert performance (the music without the ballet), in Saint Petersburg under Serge Koussevitzky. On 5 April that year, Stravinsky experienced for himself the popular success of Le Sacre as a concert work, at the Casino de Paris. After the performance, again under Monteux, the composer was carried in triumph from the hall on the shoulders of his admirers. The Rite had its first British concert performance on 7 June 1921, at the Queen's Hall in London under Eugene Goossens. Its American premiere occurred on 3 March 1922, when Stokowski included it in a Philadelphia Orchestra programme. Goossens was also responsible for introducing The Rite to Australia on 23 August 1946 at the Sydney Town Hall, as guest conductor of the Sydney Symphony Orchestra.

Stravinsky first conducted the work in 1926, in a concert given by the Concertgebouw Orchestra in Amsterdam; two years later he brought it to the Salle Pleyel in Paris for two performances under his baton. Of these occasions he later wrote that "thanks to the experience I had gained with all kinds of orchestras ... I had reached a point where I could obtain exactly what I wanted, as I wanted it". Commentators have broadly agreed that the work has had a greater impact in the concert hall than it has on the stage; many of Stravinsky's revisions to the music were made with the concert hall rather than the theatre in mind. The work has become a staple in the repertoires of all the leading orchestras, and has been cited by Leonard Bernstein as "the most important piece of music of the 20th century".

In 1963, 50 years after the premiere, Monteux (then aged 88) agreed to conduct a commemorative performance at London's Royal Albert Hall. According to Isaiah Berlin, a close friend of the composer, Stravinsky informed him that he had no intention of hearing his music being "murdered by that frightful butcher". Instead he arranged tickets for that particular evening's performance of Mozart's opera The Marriage of Figaro, at Covent Garden. Under pressure from his friends, Stravinsky was persuaded to leave the opera after the first act. He arrived at the Albert Hall just as the performance of The Rite was ending; (Note: In a different account of the incident, the music historian Richard Morrison writes that Stravinsky arrived at the end of the first part, rather than at the end of the piece.) composer and conductor shared a warm embrace in front of the unaware, wildly cheering audience. Monteux's biographer John Canarina provides a different slant on this occasion, recording that by the end of the evening Stravinsky had asserted that "Monteux, almost alone among conductors, never cheapened Rite or looked for his own glory in it, and he continued to play it all his life with the greatest fidelity".

== Music ==
=== General character ===
Commentators have often described The Rite's music in vivid terms; Paul Rosenfeld, in 1920, wrote of it "pound[ing] with the rhythm of engines, whirls and spirals like screws and fly-wheels, grinds and shrieks like laboring metal". In a more recent analysis, The New York Times critic Donal Henahan refers to "great crunching, snarling chords from the brass and thundering thumps from the timpani". The composer Julius Harrison acknowledged the uniqueness of the work negatively: it demonstrated Stravinsky's "abhorrence of everything for which music has stood these many centuries ... all human endeavour and progress are being swept aside to make room for hideous sounds".

In The Firebird, Stravinsky had begun to experiment with bitonality (the use of two different keys simultaneously). He took this technique further in Petrushka, but reserved its full effect for The Rite where, as the analyst E.W. White explains, he "pushed [it] to its logical conclusion". White also observes the music's complex metrical character, with combinations of duple and triple time in which a strong irregular beat is emphasised by powerful percussion. The music critic Alex Ross has described the irregular process whereby Stravinsky adapted and absorbed traditional Russian folk material into the score. He "proceeded to pulverize them into motivic bits, pile them up in layers, and reassemble them in cubistic collages and montages".

The duration of the work is about 35 minutes.

=== Instrumentation ===
The score calls for a large orchestra consisting of the following instruments:

Woodwinds

1 piccolo
3 flutes (third doubling second piccolo)
1 alto flute
4 oboes (fourth doubling second cor anglais)
1 cor anglais
3 clarinets in B♭ and A (third doubling second bass clarinet)
1 clarinet in E♭ and D
1 bass clarinet
4 bassoons (fourth doubling second contrabassoon)
1 contrabassoon

Brass

8 horns (seventh and eighth doubling tenor Wagner tubas)
1 piccolo trumpet in D
4 trumpets in C (fourth doubling bass trumpet in E♭)
3 trombones
2 bass tubas

Percussion

5 timpani (requiring two players)
bass drum
tam-tam
triangle
tambourine
cymbals
antique cymbals in A♭ and B♭
güiro

Strings

violins I, II
violas
cellos
double basses

Despite the large orchestra, much of the score is written chamber-fashion, with individual instruments and small groups having distinct roles.

=== Part I: The Adoration of the Earth ===
The opening melody is played by a solo bassoon in a very high register, which renders the instrument almost unidentifiable; gradually other woodwind instruments are sounded and are eventually joined by strings. The sound builds up before stopping suddenly, Hill says, "just as it is bursting ecstatically into bloom". There is then a reiteration of the opening bassoon solo, now played a semitone lower.

The first dance, "Augurs of Spring", is characterized by a repetitive stamping chord in the horns and strings, based on E♭ dominant 7 superimposed on an F♭ major triad (i.e., F♭, A♭, and C♭) (Note: This is enharmonically equivalent to an E major triad, i.e. E, G♯, and B; however, the score clearly notates it as an F♭ major triad.). White suggests that this bitonal combination, which Stravinsky considered the focal point of the entire work, was devised on the piano, since the constituent chords are comfortable fits for the hands on a keyboard. The rhythm of the stamping is disturbed by Stravinsky's constant shifting of the accent, on and off the beat, before the dance ends in a collapse, as if from exhaustion. Alex Ross has summed up the pattern (italics = rhythmic accents) as follows:

one two three four five six seven eight
one two three four five six seven eight
one two three four five six seven eight
one two three four five six seven eight

According to Roger Nichols: "At first sight there seems no pattern in the distribution of accents to the stamping chords. Taking the initial quaver of bar 1 as a natural accent we have for the first outburst the following groups of quavers: 9, 2, 6, 3, 4, 5, 3. However, these apparently random numbers make sense when split into two groups:

9 6 4 3
2 3 5

Clearly the top line is decreasing, the bottom line increasing, and by respectively decreasing and increasing amounts ...Whether Stravinsky worked them out like this we shall probably never know. But the way two different rhythmic 'orders' interfere with each other to produce apparent chaos is... a typically Stravinskyan notion."

The "Ritual of Abduction" which follows is described by Hill as "the most terrifying of musical hunts". It concludes in a series of flute trills that usher in the "Spring Rounds", in which a slow and laborious theme gradually rises to a dissonant fortissimo, a "ghastly caricature" of the episode's main tune.

Brass and percussion predominate as the "Ritual of the Rival Tribes" begins. A tune emerges on two tenor and two bass tubas, leading after much repetition to the entry of the Sage's procession. The music then comes to a virtual halt, "bleached free of colour" (Hill), as the Sage blesses the earth. The "Dance of the Earth" then begins, bringing Part I to a close in a series of phrases of the utmost vigour which are abruptly terminated in what Hill describes as a "blunt, brutal amputation".

=== Part II: The Sacrifice ===
Sketches of Maria Piltz performing the sacrificial dance

Part II has a greater cohesion than its predecessor. Hill describes the music as following an arc stretching from the beginning of the Introduction to the conclusion of the final dance. Woodwind and muted trumpets are prominent throughout the Introduction, which ends with a number of rising cadences on strings and flutes. The transition into the "Mystic Circles" is almost imperceptible; the main theme of the section has been prefigured in the Introduction. A loud repeated chord, which Berger likens to a call to order, announces the moment for choosing the sacrificial victim. The "Glorification of the Chosen One" is brief and violent; in the "Evocation of the Ancestors" that follows, short phrases are interspersed with drum rolls. The "Ritual Action of the Ancestors" begins quietly, but slowly builds to a series of climaxes before subsiding suddenly into the quiet phrases that began the episode.

The final transition introduces the "Sacrificial Dance". This is written as a more disciplined ritual than the extravagant dance that ended Part I, though it contains some wild moments, with the large percussion section of the orchestra given full voice. Stravinsky had difficulties with this section, especially with the final bars that conclude the work. The abrupt ending displeased several critics, one of whom wrote that the music "suddenly falls over on its side". Stravinsky himself referred to the final chord disparagingly as "a noise", but in his various attempts to amend or rewrite the section, was unable to produce a more acceptable solution.

== Influence and adaptations ==
The music historian Donald Jay Grout has written: "The Sacre is undoubtedly the most famous composition of the early 20th century ... it had the effect of an explosion that so scattered the elements of musical language that they could never again be put together as before". The academic and critic Jan Smaczny, echoing Bernstein, calls it one of the 20th century's most influential compositions, providing "endless stimulation for performers and listeners". Taruskin writes that "one of the marks of The Rite's unique status is the number of books that have been devoted to it—certainly a greater number than have been devoted to any other ballet, possibly to any other individual musical composition ..." According to Kelly the 1913 premiere might be considered "the most important single moment in the history of 20th-century music", and its repercussions continue to reverberate in the 21st century. Ross has described The Rite as a prophetic work, presaging the "second avant-garde" era in classical composition—music of the body rather than of the mind, in which "[m]elodies would follow the patterns of speech; rhythms would match the energy of dance ... sonorities would have the hardness of life as it is really lived". The work is regarded as among the first examples of modernism in music.

Among 20th-century composers most influenced by The Rite is Stravinsky's near contemporary, Edgard Varèse, who had attended the 1913 premiere. Varèse, according to Ross, was particularly drawn to the "cruel harmonies and stimulating rhythms" of The Rite, which he employed to full effect in his concert work Amériques (1921), scored for a massive orchestra with added sound effects including a lion's roar and a wailing siren. Aaron Copland, to whom Stravinsky was a particular inspiration in the former's student days, considered The Rite a masterpiece that had created "the decade of the displaced accent and the polytonal chord". Copland adopted Stravinsky's technique of composing in small sections which he then shuffled and rearranged, rather than working through from beginning to end. Ross cites the music of Copland's ballet Billy the Kid as coming directly from the "Spring Rounds" section of The Rite. For Olivier Messiaen The Rite was of special significance; he constantly analysed and expounded on the work, which gave him an enduring model for rhythmic drive and assembly of material. Stravinsky was sceptical about over-intellectual analysis of the work. "The man has found reasons for every note and that the clarinet line in page 3 is the inverted counterpoint of the horn in page 19. I never thought about that", he allegedly replied to Michel Legrand when asked about Pierre Boulez's take on the matter.

After the premiere the writer Léon Vallas opined that Stravinsky had written music 30 years ahead of its time, suitable to be heard in 1940. Coincidentally, it was in that year that Walt Disney released Fantasia, an animated feature film using music from The Rite and other classical compositions, conducted by Stokowski. The Rite segment of the film depicted the Earth's prehistory, with the creation of life, leading to the extinction of the dinosaurs as the finale. Among those impressed by the film was Gunther Schuller, later a composer, conductor and jazz scholar. The Rite of Spring sequence, he says, overwhelmed him and determined his future career in music: "I hope [Stravinsky] appreciated that hundreds—perhaps thousands—of musicians were turned onto The Rite of Spring ... through Fantasia, musicians who might otherwise never have heard the work, or at least not until many years later". In later life Stravinsky claimed distaste for the adaptation, though as Ross remarks, he said nothing critical at the time; according to Ross, the composer Paul Hindemith observed that "Igor appears to love it".

== Recordings ==
Before the first gramophone disc recordings of The Rite were issued in 1929, Stravinsky had helped to produce a pianola version of the work for the London branch of the Aeolian Company. He also created a much more comprehensive arrangement for the Pleyela, manufactured by the French piano company Pleyel, with whom he signed two contracts in April and May 1921, under which many of his early works were reproduced on this medium. The Pleyela version of The Rite of Spring was issued in 1921; the British pianolist Rex Lawson first recorded the work in this form in 1990.

In 1929 Stravinsky and Monteux vied with each other to conduct the first orchestral gramophone recording of The Rite. While Stravinsky led L'Orchestre des Concerts Straram in a recording for the Columbia label, at the same time Monteux was recording it for the HMV label. Stokowski's version followed in 1930. Stravinsky made two more recordings, in 1940 and 1960. According to the critic Edward Greenfield, Stravinsky was not technically a great conductor but, Greenfield says, in the 1960 recording with the Columbia Symphony Orchestra the composer inspired a performance with "extraordinary thrust and resilience". In conversations with Robert Craft, Stravinsky reviewed several recordings of The Rite made in the 1960s. He thought Herbert von Karajan's 1963 recording with the Berlin Philharmonic, was good, but "the performance is ... too polished, a pet savage rather than a real one". Stravinsky thought that Pierre Boulez, with the Orchestre National de France (1963), was "less good than I had hoped ... very bad tempi and some tasteless alterations". He praised a 1962 recording by The Moscow State Symphony Orchestra for making the music sound Russian, "which is just right", but Stravinsky's concluding judgement was that none of these three performances was worth preserving.

As of 2013 there were well over 100 different recordings of The Rite commercially available, and many more held in library sound archives. It has become one of the most recorded of all 20th century musical works.

== Editions ==
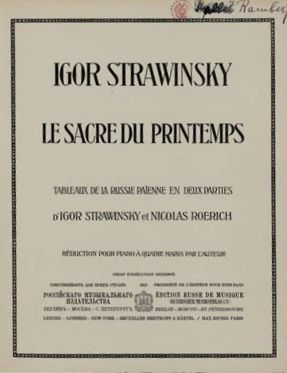
Cover of the 1913 four-hand piano reduction of Le Sacre du printemps, the first published version of the work

The first published score was the four-hand piano arrangement (Edition Russe de Musique, RV196), dated 1913. Publication of the full orchestral score was prevented by the outbreak of war in August 1914. After the revival of the work in 1920 Stravinsky, who had not heard the music for seven years, made numerous revisions to the score, which was finally published in 1921 (Edition Russe de Musique, RV 197/197b. large and pocket scores).

In 1922 Ansermet, who was preparing to perform the work in Berlin, sent to Stravinsky a list of errors he had found in the published score. In 1926, as part of his preparation for that year's performance with the Concertgebouw Orchestra, Stravinsky rewrote the "Evocation of the Ancestors" section and made substantial changes to the "Sacrificial Dance". The extent of these revisions, together with Ansermet's recommendations, convinced Stravinsky that a new edition was necessary, and this appeared in large and pocket form in 1929. It did not, however, incorporate all of Ansermet's amendments and, confusingly, bore the date and RV code of the 1921 edition, making the new edition hard to identify.

Stravinsky continued to revise the work, and in 1943 rewrote the "Sacrificial Dance". In 1948 Boosey & Hawkes issued a corrected version of the 1929 score (B&H 16333), although Stravinsky's substantial 1943 amendment of the "Sacrificial Dance" was not incorporated into the new version and remained unperformed, to the composer's disappointment. He considered it "much easier to play ... and superior in balance and sonority" to the earlier versions. A less musical motive for the revisions and corrected editions was copyright law. The composer had left Galaxy Music Corporation (agents for Editions Russe de la Musique, the original publisher) for Associated Music Publishers at the time, and orchestras would be reluctant to pay a second rental charge from two publishers to match the full work and the revised Sacrificial Dance; moreover, the revised dance could only be published in America. The 1948 score provided copyright protection to the work in America, where it had lapsed, but Boosey (who acquired the Editions Russe catalogue) did not have the rights to the revised finale.

The 1929 score as revised in 1948 forms the basis of most modern performances of The Rite. Boosey & Hawkes reissued their 1948 edition in 1965, and produced a newly engraved edition (B&H 19441) in 1967. The firm also issued an unmodified reprint of the 1913 piano reduction in 1952 (B&H 17271) and a revised piano version, incorporating the 1929 revisions, in 1967.

The Paul Sacher Foundation, in association with Boosey & Hawkes, announced in May 2013, as part of The Rite's centenary celebrations, their intention to publish the 1913 autograph score, as used in early performances. After being kept in Russia for decades, the autograph score was acquired by Boosey & Hawkes in 1947. The firm presented the score to Stravinsky in 1962, on his 80th birthday. After the composer's death in 1971 the manuscript was acquired by the Paul Sacher Foundation. As well as the autograph score, they have published the manuscript piano four-hands score.

In 2000, Kalmus Music Publishers brought out an edition where former Philadelphia Orchestra librarian Clint Nieweg made over 21,000 corrections to the score and parts. Since then a published errata list added some 310 more corrections. Then in 2021, Serenissima Music published a newer Nieweg edition, incorporating 2,200 more corrections based on Stravinsky's autograph manuscript score, superseding the older 2000 edition.

== Notes and references ==
=== Sources ===
- Adami, Giuseppe (1974). Giacomo Puccini: Letters. Translated by Ena Makin. London: Harrap. ISBN 978-0-245-52422-6.
- Buckle, Richard (1979). Diaghilev. London: Weidenfeld & Nicolson. ISBN 978-0-297-77506-5.
- Bullard, Truman (1971). The first performance of Igor Stravinsky's Sacre du printemps. Ann Arbor, Michigan: Ann Arbor University (microfilm copy). OCLC 937514.
- Calvocoressi, Michel-Dimitri (1934). Music and Ballet. London: Faber & Faber. OCLC 3375044.
- Canarina, John (2003). Pierre Monteux, Maître. Pompton Plains, New Jersey: Amadeus Press. ISBN 978-1-57467-082-0.
- Del Mar, Norman (1981). Anatomy of the Orchestra. London: Faber & Faber. ISBN 978-0-571-11552-5.
- Everdell, William R. (15 February 2009). The First Moderns: Profiles in the Origins of Twentieth-Century Thought. University of Chicago Press. ISBN 978-0-226-22484-8.
- Grigoriev, Serge (1952). The Diaghilev Ballet 1909–1929. London: Constable.
- Grout, Donald Jay; Palisca, Claude V. (1981). A History of Western Music (3rd ed.). London and Melbourne: J. M. Dent & Sons. ISBN 978-0-460-04546-9.
- Harrison, Julius (1934). "The Orchestra and Orchestral Music". In Bacharach, A. L. (ed.). The Musical Companion. London: Victor Gollancz. OCLC 991797.
- Hill, Peter (2000). Stravinsky: The Rite of Spring. Cambridge: Cambridge University Press. ISBN 978-0-521-62714-6.
- Johnson, Robert (1992). "Sacred Scandals". Dance Chronicle. 15 (2): 227–236. doi:10.1080/01472529208569095. JSTOR 1567675.
- Kelly, Thomas Forrest (2000). First Nights: Five Musical Premieres. New Haven: Yale University Press. ISBN 978-0-300-07774-2.
- Morrison, Richard (2004). Orchestra. London: Faber and Faber. ISBN 978-0-571-21584-3.
- Neff, Severine; Carr, Maureen; Horlacher, Gretchen; Reef, John, eds. (2013). The Rite of Spring at 100. Indiana University Press. doi:10.2307/j.ctt2005z70. ISBN 978-0-253-02735-1.
  - Levitz, Tamara. "Racism at the Rite". In Neff et al. (2013), pp. 146–178.
  - Taruskin, Richard. "Resisting The Rite". In Neff et al. (2013), pp. 417–446.
- Orenstein, Arbie (1975). Ravel: Man and Musician. New York: Columbia University Press. ISBN 978-0-231-03902-4.
- Reid, Charles (1961). Thomas Beecham: An Independent Biography. London: V. Gollancz. OCLC 1016272508.
- Rosenfeld, Paul (1920). Musical Portraits: Interpretations of Twenty Modern Composers. New York: Harcourt, Brace and Howe. OCLC 854294.
- Ross, Alex (2008). The Rest Is Noise. London: Fourth Estate. ISBN 978-1-84115-475-6.
- Smith, William Ander (1996). The Mystery of Leopold Stokowski. Cranbury, New Jersey: Association of University Presses. ISBN 978-0-8386-3362-5.
- Stravinsky, Igor (1962). An Autobiography. New York: W. W. Norton. OCLC 2872436.
- Stravinsky, Igor; Craft, Robert (1959). Conversations with Igor Stravinsky. New York: Doubleday. OCLC 896750.
- Stravinsky, Igor; Craft, Robert (1981) [1959]. Expositions and Developments. Berkeley and Los Angeles: University of California Press. ISBN 978-0-520-04403-6.
- Stravinsky, Igor; Craft, Robert (1982) [1961]. Dialogues. Berkeley and Los Angeles: University of California Press. ISBN 978-0-520-04650-4.
- Taruskin, Richard (Autumn 1980). "Russian Folk Melodies in The Rite of Spring". Journal of the American Musicological Society. 33 (3): 501–534. doi:10.1525/jams.1980.33.3.03a00040. JSTOR 831304.
- Taruskin, Richard (1996). Stravinsky and the Russian Tradition (Vol. I). Berkeley and Los Angeles: University of California Press. ISBN 978-0-520-07099-8.
- Van den Toorn, Pieter C. (1987). Stravinsky and the Rite of Spring: The Beginnings of a Musical Language. Berkeley and Los Angeles: University of California Press. ISBN 978-0-520-05958-0.
- Walsh, Stephen (1999). Stravinsky: A Creative Spring. London: Jonathan Cape. ISBN 978-0-224-06021-9.
- Walsh, Stephen (2012). "Stravinsky, Igor". Grove Music Online. Oxford University Press. doi:10.1093/gmo/9781561592630.article.52818. ISBN 978-1-56159-263-0. (subscription, Wikilibrary access, or UK public library membership required)
- White, Eric Walter (1961). "Stravinsky". In Hartog, Howard (ed.). European Music in the Twentieth Century. London: Pelican Books. OCLC 263537162.
- White, Eric Walter (1966). Stravinsky the Composer and his Works (Original ed.). Berkeley and Los Angeles: University of California Press. OCLC 283025.
- White, Eric Walter (1979). Stravinsky the Composer and his Works (2nd ed.). Berkeley and Los Angeles: University of California Press. ISBN 978-0-520-03985-8.
