= Truba =

Musical instrument

- Classification: Aerophone
- Hornbostel–Sachs classification: 422.121-1

Playing range
- c^{3}-g^{5}

Related instruments
- Lihava; Sihna'na truba; Rih

The Wooden Trumpet (truba (Ukrainian: Труба) Lihava, Cossack Trumpet, Sihnal'na truba). The truba, or lihava, is an instrument of the surma-horn type, only with a mouthpiece like that of a standard trumpet made of wood. The instrument has seven to ten finger-holes and is used in contemporary folk instrument orchestras.

== See also ==
- Ukrainian folk music

== Sources ==
- Humeniuk, A. - Ukrainski narodni muzychni instrumenty - Kyiv: Naukova dumka, 1967
- Mizynec, V. - Ukrainian Folk Instruments - Melbourne: Bayda books, 1984
- Cherkaskyi, L. - Ukrainski narodni muzychni instrumenty // Tekhnika, Kyiv, Ukraine, 2003 - 262 pages. ISBN 966-575-111-5
