= Ukrainian folk music =

Music genre

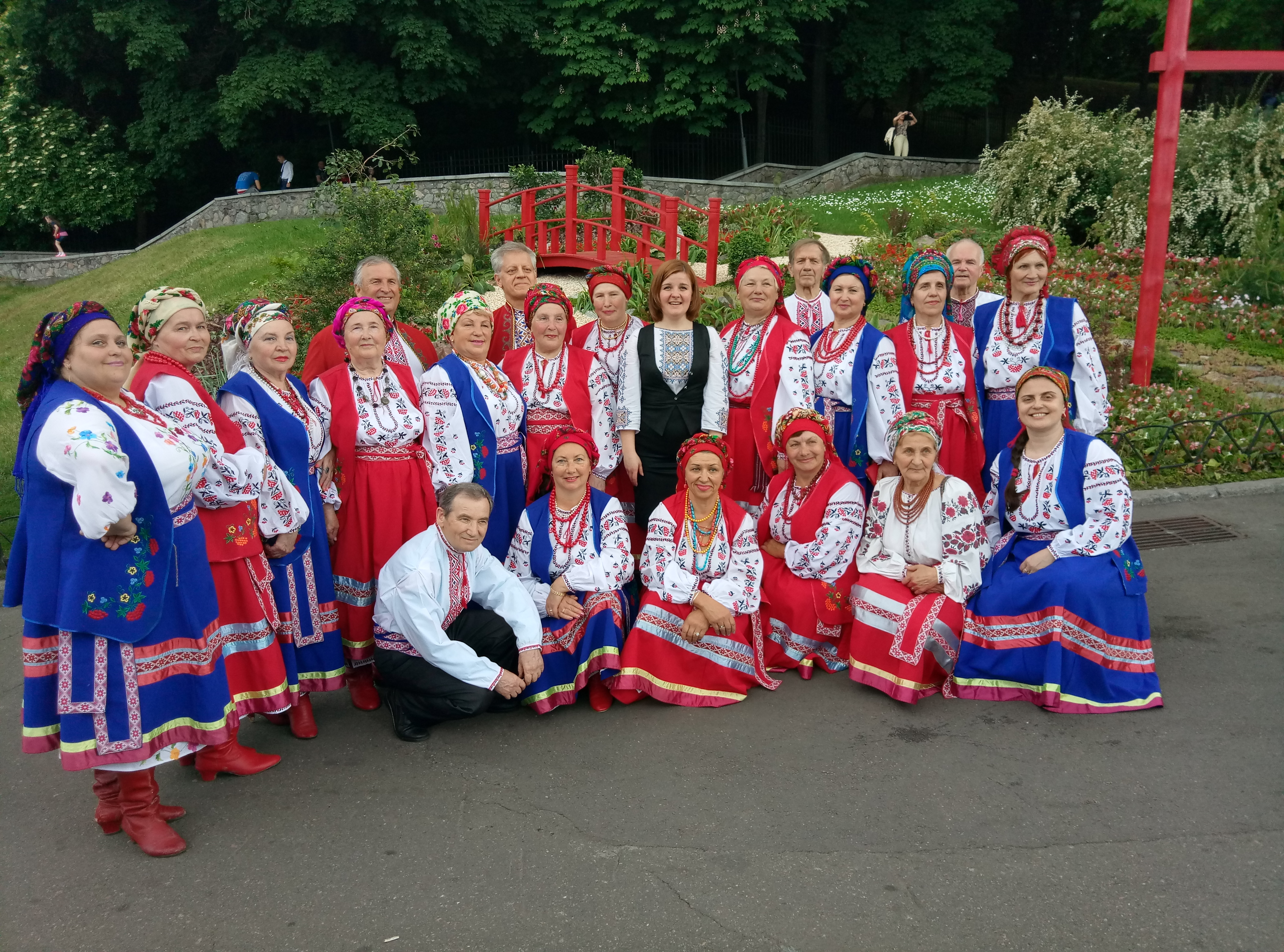
Ukrainian folk choir

Ukrainian folk music includes a number of varieties of traditional, folkloric, folk-inspired popular music, and folk-inspired European classical music traditions.

In the 20th century numerous ethnographic and folkloric musical ensembles were established in Ukraine and gained popularity.

During the Soviet era, music was a controlled commodity and was used as a tool for the indoctrination of the population. As a result, the repertoire of Ukrainian folk music performers and ensembles was controlled and restricted.

== Vocal music ==
=== Authentic folk singing ===
Ukrainians, particularly in Eastern Ukraine have fostered a peculiar style of singing – The White voice (Ukrainian: Білий голос). This type of singing primarily exploits the chest register and is akin to controlled yelling or shouting. The vocal range is restrictive and in a lower tessitura. In recent times vocal courses have been established to study this particular form of singing. Among the most popular exponents of traditional Ukrainian folk singing in the modern era are Nina Matviyenko and Raisa Kyrychenko.

==== Singing ensembles ====
Ensemble singing in three and occasionally four-part harmony was one of the features of traditional village music in Ukraine. The multi-part singing used in Central Ukraine was thought to have been unique at the turn of the 19th century. Numerous folk choirs were established (Okhmatinsky choir) and studies were published on the style of choral singing.

It was supported in the Soviet period in opposition to church music, as village song was viewed by the authorities as being more proletarian.

In recent times (post-1980s) there is a movement toward authentic ensemble singing particularly in eastern Ukraine with the establishment of various ensembles and festivals there focusing on this style of music. Notable groups who perform in this tradition are Dyke Pole and Bozhychi.

==== Folkloric ensembles ====
The first such ensemble in Ukraine was the Okhmatynsky Village Folk Choir organized by Dr Mykola Demutsky in 1889. Ethnographic ensembles became popular in the 20th century. These were usually choirs often with orchestral accompaniment and sometimes a group of dancers. They originally performed works based on the ethnic folk music of the area, however over the past 40 years they have become more academic regarding their performance style and material.

The most prominent professional groups are:

- State Academic Merited Ukrainian Folk Choir named after Hryhoriy Veryovka (established 1943)

Regional groups include:

- Veselka – (now known as Poltava) (est. 1987, Poltava)
- Donbas – merited miners ensemble of song and dance (est. 1937 Donetsk)
- Podolianka – ensemble of song and dance (est. 1938 Khmelnytskyi)
- Bukovina merited ensemble of song and dance (est. 1944, Chernivtsi)
- Transcarpathian merited folk choir (est. 1945, (Uzhhorod)
- Verkhovyna – merited Carpathian ensemble of song and dance (est. 1946, Drohobych)
- Lionok – Polissia ensemble of song and dance (est. 1970, Zhytomyr)
- Tavria – Women's vocal-choreographic ensemble (est 1971, Simferopol)
- Slavutych – ensemble of song and dance (est. 1972, Dnipro)
- Volyn Folk Choir (est. 1978, Lutsk)
- Zoria ensemble (est. 1987, Rivne)

Characteristics of these choirs were the use of chest register singing (particularly in Eastern Ukraine) and the use of Ukrainian folk instruments in the accompanying orchestras.

=== Art singing ===
In the 20th century, popular operatic singers like Modest Mencinsky and Solomea Krushelnycki included Ukrainian folk songs in their concert performances. Other prominent Ukrainian singers including Ivan Kozlovsky, Borys Hmyria, Anatoliy Solovianenko have also propagated the singing of Ukrainian folk songs and romances. In the United States Kvitka Cisyk also promoted art songs.

==== Choral art singing ====
Choral singing has a rich tradition in Ukraine. While the Catholic West developed sophisticated vocal instrumental works, the Orthodox church frowned on the use of musical instruments in sacred music and a cappella choral music was the only genre that was actively supported.

In the 20th century notable Ukrainian a cappella choirs have included the Ukrainian National Choir, Dumka (choir), Kyiv frescoes and Boyan which is the touring choir of the L. Revutsky Capella of Ukraine.

Notable choral conductors include Olexander Koshetz, Wolodymyr Kolesnyk, Nestor Horodovenko, Dmytro Kotko.

=== Accompanied singing ===
In Ukraine there existed a class of professional musicians who sang to their own instrumental accompaniment. These professional musicians were often known as kobzari or lirnyky. This category also includes players of the torban and bandura. The repertoire of these itinerant musicians differed considerably from that sung by the folk including the performance of dumy (sung epic poems).

In the 20th century the vocal-instrumental tradition has grown into a movement where ensembles and whole choirs sing to their own accompaniment on these instruments. Notable examples include the Ukrainian Bandurist Chorus, The Canadian Bandurist Capella and the Kyiv Bandurist Capella.

== Traditional instrumental music ==
Ukrainians have a wealth of folk instruments and a well-developed tradition of instrumental music. This is particularly because the Soviet government strongly discouraged the population away from religious music and encouraged "proletarian" forms of musical performance.

The bulk of the ethnic Ukrainian population lived in a village setting and did not share the urban culture of the city-based elite that controlled the country. As a result, traditional village music was encouraged and fostered.

=== Scholarship ===
The first significant scholarship dealing with authentic Ukrainian folk instrumental music traditions is ascribed to the Ukrainian composer Mykola Lysenko and his publications starting in 1874 was dealing with the bandura and other Ukrainian folk instruments.

Further scholarship was undertaken in the early 20th century by ethnomusicologists Filaret Kolessa and Klyment Kvitka. Publications in the new science of organology were undertaken by Hnat Khotkevych with his 1930 monograph "Musical instruments of the Ukrainian people". It was banned by the Soviet authorities in 1934 because it studied the phenomena of folk instruments from a national perspective.

After WWII scholarship was continued by Andriy Humeniuk who began the trend of mixing Soviet innovations in instrument construction and training with authentic instrumental music. This tendency was avoided by Sofia Hrytsa but became a feature of the publications of Victor Hutsal, Victor Mishalow and the bulk of Soviet and post-Soviet scholarship.

In recent times this trend has taken an about-face with the publications by the ethnomusicologist Mykhailo Khai of the early 21st century which has clearly separated Ukrainian instrumental music into so-called authentic and so-called fakeloric instrumental music traditions.

Significant contributions to the study of Ukrainian organology and performance have been done by both Russian and Polish ethnomusicologists such as Alexander Famintsyn and Stanislaw Mzrekowski.

=== Instruments ===
==== Idiophones (percussion) ====
- Briazalnytsia
- Bubon (Buben)
- Bubentsi
- Bubonchyk
- Buhay
- Bukhalo
- Bylo
- Derkach
- Drymba (Vargan)
- Dzvin – bell
- Dzvinok – bells
- Kalatalo
- Klepalo
- Korobochka
- Lozhky – decorated wooden spoons.
- Tarilky – cymbals
- Pidkova – horseshoe
- Rapach
- Rubel
- Skrynka
- Trishchotky – set of wooden boards on a string that are clapped together as a group.
- Trykutnyk – triangle
- Vertushka
- Zatula
- Zvonchalka

==== Membranophones ====
- Lytavry, Tulumbas – kettle drum
- Baraban – side drum
- Bubon – large tambourine
- Buhay, Berbenytsia
- Hrebinetz – comb
- Ocheretianka

==== String instruments ====
- Bandura – a multi-stringed zither played with the fingers.
- Kobza – four-stringed lute with a round soundboard, plucked or strummed with or without a plectrum.
- Lira – a Ukrainian hurdy-gurdy with an oval or cello-shaped body and an attached triangular pegbox.
- Hudok – a three-stringed, pear-shaped Ukrainian bowed instrument which is usually held vertically, a relative of rebec.
- Husli – one of the oldest known Ukrainian musical instruments, described by the Greeks as early as the 6th century CE. Many different versions of this plucked string instrument exist.
- Torban – a relative of the theorbo with its own unique tuning.
- Tsymbaly – a relative of the cymbalom with its own unique tuning.
- Skrypka – a relative of the violin.
- Basolia – a 3-string cello with its own unique tuning.
- Tsytra – Ukrainian cittern.
- Kozobas -a Western Ukrainian bowed and percussive instrument.

==== Wind instruments ====
- Dentsivka – a hollow pipe with no additional air holes, used for whistling sounds.
- Dudka-vykrutka – a shepherd's instrument in Rivne Polesia.
- Dvodentsivka – double fipple flute
- Floyara – a non fipple flute
- Frilka – a smaller version of the floyara
- Kosa dudka
- Kuvytsi – variant of panpipes
- Okaryna – Ukrainian ocarina
- Rebro – variant of the panpipes
- Rih – Ukrainian folk clarinet/hornpipe.
- Rizhok – small horn
- Pivtoradentsivka
- Sopilka – simple fipple flute in various sizes
- Surma – a folk oboe or shawm.
- Sviril – Ukrainian panpipe.
- Svystunetz – folk whistle
- Telenka – an overtone flute
- Trembita, Lihava – Alpine horn
- Truba – a wooden trumpet.
- Volynka, Duda, Koza – traditional Slavic bagpipe.
- Zholomiha – a double fipple flute
- Zubivka – similar to Telenka

==== Recent instruments ====
- Bayan – a chromatic button accordion
- Ukrainian balalaika – a 6-string regional variant of the Russian balalaika
- 4-string domra – a regional variant of the 3-string Russian domra
- Mandolin
- Seven-string guitar

== Influence and legacy ==
=== Regional ===
Ukrainian folk music has had a significant influence on the music of neighbouring peoples. Many Ukrainian melodies have become popular in Poland, Slovakia, Austria, Russia, Romania and Moldova. Through the interaction with the Eastern European Jewish community, Ukrainian folk songs such as "Oi ne khody Hrytsiu" composed by singer Marusia Churai have been introduced into North American culture as "Yes my darling daughter" (sung by Dinah Shore).

The traditional music of the kobzari inspired the Dumky composed by various Slavic composers such as Tchaikovsky, Mussorgsky and Dvořák.

The use of folk melodies is especially encouraged in ballet and opera. Among the Ukrainian composers who often included Ukrainian folk themes in their music were Lysenko, Lev Revutsky, Mykola Dremliuha, Yevhen Stankovych, Aleksandr Shymko, Myroslav Skoryk (who adapted e.g. the folk song Verbovaya Doschechka).

In the late 1960s and early 1970s Ukrainian folk songs and folk song elements began to be included in pop and rock music in the rock-oriented Kobza, Smerichka, Opryshky, Medikus and many other ensembles. This was driven by the lack of Ukrainian pop songs of the time. In time the genre of folk-inspired pop music became significant, particularly inspired by the popularity of the Belarusian group known as Pesniary.

Of the Ukrainian groups, the longest surviving and most significant was the group known as Kobza.

=== Western music ===
"Where Have All the Flowers Gone?" is a folk song of the 1960s written by Pete Seeger and Joe Hickerson. Seeger found inspiration for the song while on his way to a concert. Leafing through his notebook he saw the passage, "Where are the flowers, the girls have plucked them. Where are the girls, they've all taken husbands. Where are the men, they're all in the army." These lines were from a Ukrainian and Cossack folk song referenced in a novel by Mikhail Sholokhov, And Quiet Flows the Don. Seeger adapted it to a tune, a lumberjack version of "Drill, Ye Tarriers, Drill". With only three verses, he recorded it once in a medley on a Rainbow Quest album and forgot about it. Hickerson later added verses four and five.

"Summertime" is an aria composed by George Gershwin for the 1935 opera Porgy and Bess. The lyrics are by DuBose Heyward, the author of the novel Porgy on which the opera was based. It has since become a jazz standard. While it is primarily a spiritual in the style of the African American folk music of late nineteenth century, the Ukrainian-Canadian composer and singer Alexis Kochan has suggested that some part of Gershwin's inspiration may have come from having heard the Ukrainian lullaby, Oi Khodyt Son Kolo Vikon (A Dream Passes By The Windows) at a New York City performance by Oleksander Koshetz's Ukrainian National Chorus in 1929 (or 1926).

== See also ==
- Music of Ukraine
- List of Ukrainian Koliadkas and Shchedrivkas
