= Taraban =

Unpitched percussion instrument

- Classification: Membranophone
- Hornbostel–Sachs classification: 232.311

Related instruments
- Bubon; Resheto; Tambourine

The taraban (Turkish: daraban; Ukrainian: тарабан) is a percussive drum-like folk instrument of Turkish origin, which was once used in Ukraine and, to a lesser extent, in Poland.

The etymology of the term comes from a word meaning to make a lot of noise. The first mentions of the taraban date back to the 11th century. It was most likely introduced in East-Central Europe by the Ottoman Janissaries.

The taraban consists of a wooden ring with a diameter of up to 50 cm (20 in) which has a skin (often made of dog or cat hide) tightened over both sides. The taraban is struck with the hand or a stick. In comparison to the bubon, the taraban usually has two sides with a stretched skin and no cymbals.

It was a popular instrument among the Ukrainian Cossacks and is considered a Ukrainian folk instrument. Taraban is also mentioned in the Polish anthem and was once utilised by some army units of the Polish–Lithuanian Commonwealth.

== Related instruments ==
- Resheto
- Bubon
- Lytavry

== See also ==
- Ukrainian folk music

== Sources ==
- Humeniuk, A. Ukrainski narodni muzychni instrumenty, Kyiv: Naukova dumka, 1967 (in Ukrainian)
- Mizynec, V. Ukrainian Folk Instruments, Melbourne: Bayda books, 1984 (in Ukrainian)
- Cherkaskyi, L. Ukrainski narodni muzychni instrumenty, Tekhnika, Kyiv, Ukraine, 2003 – 262 pages. ISBN 966-575-111-5 (in Ukrainian)
