= Resheto =

Resheto - Решето
- Classification: Membranophone
- Hornbostel–Sachs classification: 232.311

Related instruments
- Taraban; Bubon; Tambourine

The resheto (Ukrainian: решето) is a Ukrainian percussive folk instrument. The resheto consists of a wooden ring with a diameter of up to 50cm (20in). Initially the ring was strung with a sieve rather than a skin tightened over one side. The resheto is struck with the hand or a stick.

== Related instruments ==
- Tambourine
- Bubon
- Taraban

== See also ==
- Ukrainian folk music

== Sources ==
- Humeniuk, A. Ukrainski narodni muzychni instrumenty, Kyiv: Naukova dumka, 1967 (in Ukrainian)
- Mizynec, V. Ukrainian Folk Instruments, Melbourne: Bayda books, 1984 (in Ukrainian)
- Cherkaskyi, L. Ukrainski narodni muzychni instrumenty, Tekhnika, Kyiv, Ukraine, 2003. 262 pages. ISBN 966-575-111-5 (in Ukrainian)
