= Zatula =

Ukrainian folk musical instrument

- Other names: rubal, rubel, kuchelka, kachanka, kachalka, rebra
- Classification: Idiophone
- Hornbostel–Sachs classification: 112.2 (Scraped Idiophones)

Related instruments
- Rubal; Rubel; Kuchelka; Kachanka; Kachalka; Rebra

The zatula (Ukrainian: Затула), also known as the rubal, rubel, rebra, kuchelka, kachanka, and kachalka, is a Ukrainian washboard also occasionally used as a folk percussion musical instrument.

The zatula consists of a piece of wood with grooves carved into it. A wooden rod is run over these grooves to soften clothes after washing. A musician plays the zatula in a humorous way, by placing the rounded rod under the chin and using the zatula as a bow, playing over the rod, or vice versa. The rasping sound thus produced is similar to that of the derkach.

== See also ==
- Ukrainian folk music
- Washboard

== Sources ==
- Humeniuk, A. Ukrainski narodni muzychni instrumenty, Kyiv: Naukova dumka, 1967 (in Ukrainian)
- Mizynec, V. Ukrainian Folk Instruments, Melbourne: Bayda books, 1984 (in Ukrainian)
- Cherkaskyi, L. Ukrainski narodni muzychni instrumenty, Tekhnika, Kyiv, Ukraine, 2003 - 262 pages. ISBN 966-575-111-5 (in Ukrainian)
