= HulyaiHorod =

Ukrainian folk band

- Origin: Kropyvnytskyi, Ukraine
- Genres: Folk
- Years active: 2002-present
- Members: Serhiy Postolnykov, Iryna Baramba, Anastasia Filatova, Olena Didyk, Oleksandr Vovk, Severyn Danyleiko, Danylo Danyleiko, Kyi Danyleiko, Ruslan Pavliuk, Oleksiy Nahorniuk
- Website: http://gulgorod.com/en/

HulyaiHorod (Ukrainian: Гуляйгород) is a Ukrainian folk band.

== Description ==
The band HulyaiHorod was founded in Kropyvnytskyi, Ukraine, in 2002 as a continuation of student bands Дикий Карапет (Wild Karapet) and Златопіль (Zlatopil). Kropyvnytskyi functions as the administrative center of the Kirovohrad Oblast, which is a place of birth for significant number of band members.

The members of HulyaiHorod actively explore the traditional folklore of the central regions of Ukraine, so called Middle Dnipro Ukraine (Cherkasy, Poltava and Kirovohrad regions). The repertoire of the band includes traditional instrumental music: calendar, ritual, social and everyday life songs as well as dances, collected from village artists in expeditions. The songs are performed in a traditional polyphonic manner of singing, which is a typical style in Central Ukraine. The band treats folklore as a fully developed, independent culture. Therefore, it does not allow any processing, enhancements or “polishing” of authentic original sources for achieving stage effects. While performing the songs, the band pays attention to preserving unique features of local traditions. HulyaiHorod does not mechanically copy traditional songs but imbibes traditions and tries to follow them.

The band members also conduct workshops of traditional Ukrainian dances, such as Гопак (Hopak), Орлиця (Orlytsa), Гречаники (Hrechanyky), Баламут (Balumut) and Молодичка (Molodychka), accompanied by triple music, which includes two violins, basolia and buben.

Since 2015 the band has worked on GG HulyaiHorod project, which combines traditional polyphonic singing style and instrumental folk tunes with modern electronic music, including the DJ-versions. Musical compositions are created by members of HulyaiHorod in cooperation with the team of recording studio Kofein and electronic music maker Andriy Antonenko.

HulyaiHorod takes part in festivals, art events and various folklore projects in Ukraine, Germany, Poland, Lithuania, Georgia, Denmark. In 2017 the band performed at Atlas Weekend.

== Band members ==
- Serhiy Postolnykov
- Iryna Baramba
- Anastasia Filatova
- Olena Didyk
- Oleksandr Vovk
- Severyn Danyleiko
- Danylo Danyleiko
- Kyi Danyleiko
- Ruslan Pavliuk
- Oleksiy Nahorniuk

== Discography ==
- Гуляйгород (HulyaiHorod) (2005) together with the band Tartak
- Terra cosaccorum. Тера Козацька (2010) together with the band Хорея Козацька (Khorea Kozatska)
- Гуляйгород GG (GG HulyaiHorod) (2016), the music album of the ethno-electro project GG created by HulyaiHorod in collaboration with Andriy Antonenko and recording studio Kofein.
