= Pidkova =

- Classification: Ideophone
- Hornbostel–Sachs classification: 111.211

Related instruments
- Horseshoe; Triangle

The pidkova (Ukrainian: Підкова, literally "Horseshoe") is a musical instrument.

In some Ukrainian folk instrument ensembles a steel horseshoe dangling from the end of a gut string is struck with a piece of metal wire. This produces a high-pitched ringing sound similar to a triangle.

== See also ==
- Ukrainian folk music

== Sources ==
- Humeniuk, A. - Ukrainski narodni muzychni instrumenty - Kyiv: Naukova dumka, 1967
- Mizynec, V. - Ukrainian Folk Instruments - Melbourne: Bayda books, 1984
- Cherkaskyi, L. - Ukrainski narodni muzychni instrumenty // Tekhnika, Kyiv, Ukraine, 2003 - 262 pages. ISBN 966-575-111-5
