= Kozobas =

Ukrainian stringed instrument

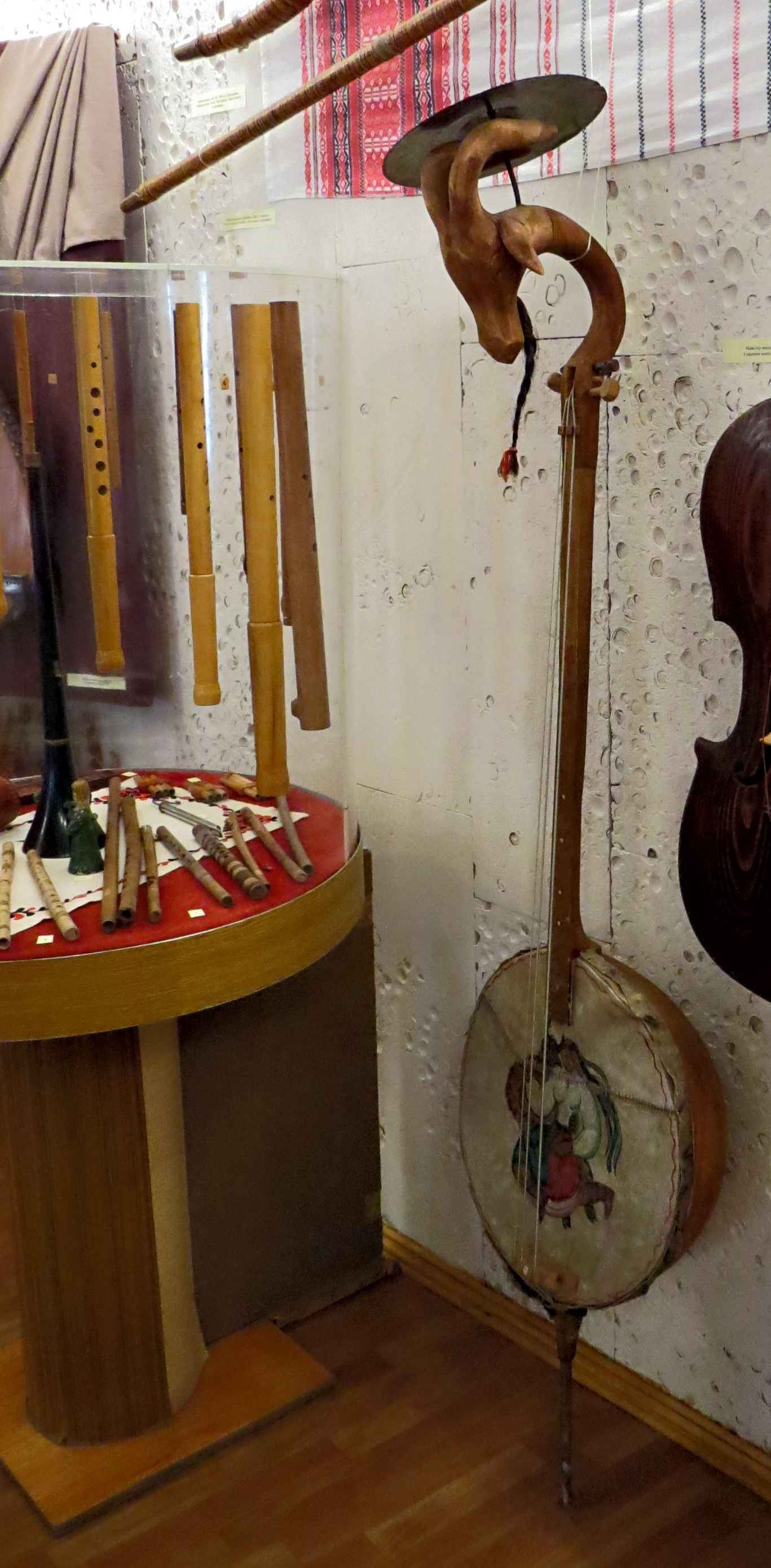
- Classification: Chordophone
- Hornbostel–Sachs classification: 321.322-71+111.2

Related instruments
- Byjkoza; Basolia

The kozobas (Ukrainian: Козобас) is a bowed and percussive instrument that is popular in folk ensembles in Western Ukraine. It is a recently developed instrument and is basically a wooden pole joined to a drum at one end with a cymbal hanging from the other end. The drum membrane acts as the soundboard for one or two strings strung from the end of the pole to the end of the drum. The strings are played with a bow that occasionally hits the cymbal hanging from the other end of the pole. Recent developments include instruments with four strings tuned like those of a double bass.

The instrument's Hornbostel-Sachs classification number is 321.322-71+111.2.

== See also ==
- Ukrainian folk music

== Sources ==
- Humeniuk, A. - Ukrainski narodni muzychni instrumenty - Kyiv: Naukova dumka, 1967
- Mizynec, V. - Ukrainian Folk Instruments - Melbourne: Bayda books, 1984
- Cherkaskyi, L. - Ukrainski narodni muzychni instrumenty // Tekhnika, Kyiv, Ukraine, 2003 - 262 pages. ISBN 966-575-111-5
