= Briazkalnytsia =

Ukrainian percussion instrument

Briaskalnytsia
- Classification: Idiophone
- Hornbostel–Sachs classification: 112.11

Related instruments
- Rattle

The briazkaltsia (Ukrainian: брязкальця) is a Ukrainian folk instrument consisting of copper or brass plates strung from a wire. In the past it was made of silver. When the instrument was shaken, it produced a jingling sound reminiscent of small bells. The instrument is now no longer used.

Hornbostel-Sachs classification number 112.11

== See also ==
- Ukrainian folk music

== Sources ==
- Humeniuk, A. - Ukrainski narodni muzychni instrumenty - Kyiv: Naukova dumka, 1967
- Mizynec, V. - Ukrainian Folk Instruments - Melbourne: Bayda books, 1984
- Cherkaskyi, L. - Ukrainski narodni muzychni instrumenty // Tekhnika, Kyiv, Ukraine, 2003 - 262 pages. ISBN 966-575-111-5

Template:Ukrainian musical instruments
