= Bubon =

Ukrainian percussion instrument

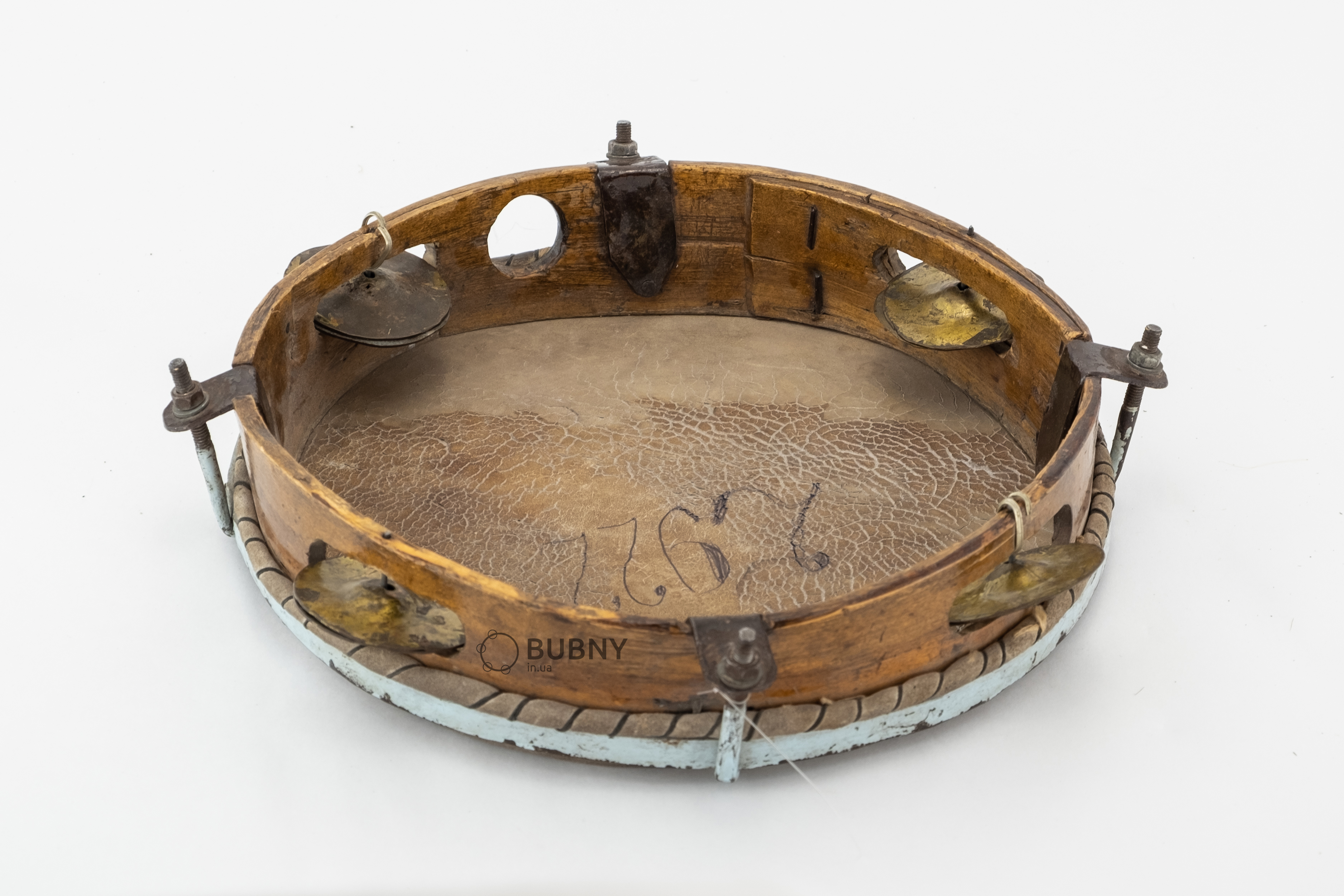
- Classification: Membranophone
- Hornbostel–Sachs classification: 232.311

Related instruments
- Taraban; Resheto; Tambourine

The bubon (Ukrainian: бубон) is a Ukrainian percussive folk instrument, of the tambourine family. The bubon consists of a wooden ring with a diameter of up to 50 centimetres (20 in) which has a skin (often from a dog) tightened over one or sometimes both sides. Occasionally, and increasingly in more modern times (late 20th century) holes are made in the wooden sides into which metal (brass) rings are placed which rattle when the bubon is struck with the hand or a stick. The first mentions of the bubon date back to the 11th century. It was also a popular instrument among the Ukrainian Cossacks.

== See also ==
- Ukrainian folk music
