= Boyan Ensemble =

Ukrainian choir

The Boyan Ensemble is a touring choir formed from many of the most accomplished voices from the L. Revutsky Cappella of Ukraine. They aim to popularise Ukrainian folk songs and liturgical and classical choral music. Songs of Cossack, Chumak and Sich Riflemen origins are included in their repertoire. They tour Britain almost every year in the autumn.

== Works ==
- Fuer Margarete! – Favourite Songs
- A Tribute to Heroes
