= Bukhalo =

Slavic folk instrument

The bukhalo (Ukrainian folk drum kit based on a bass drum) is a type of large drum often used in dance music, particularly popular in Sorbia, Belarus, Russia, Western Ukraine and Balkan brass. It is usually fixed to the player with a belt so that the performer can also dance and move about when needed. The bukhalo is struck with a stick and often has a cymbal joined to the side of the instrument which is struck by a metal rod, or another cymbal, to produce unexpected rhythmic devices. The sticks are called bubinky. The one used to strike the drum is made of wood, and the one used to strike the cymbal is made of metal.

== See also ==
- Ukrainian folk music
