= Surma-horn =

Surma
- Classification: Aerophone
- Hornbostel–Sachs classification: 422.112

Playing range
- c^{3}-g^{5}

Related instruments
- Surna; Surnai; Shawm; Sorna; Rhaita; Suona; Sopila; Birbynė

The Ukrainian surma (Ukrainian: Сурма) is a type of shawm that had widespread use in the armies of the Cossack host. It is thought that the instrument was introduced into Ukraine from the Caucasus or Turkey where the similar instruments exist with related names such as zurna and surnai.

The term is also often used to describe a type of wooden trumpet.

The surma is made of wood with a conical bore, having a bell at one end and a double reed similar to that used in the oboe at the other. It usually has nine to ten finger-holes and is capable of chromatic sounds through a range of dynamics. The instrument is reminiscent of the sound of the oboe. Presently the surma has found its way into the sound of Ukrainian folk instruments in a range of sizes such as prima, alto and bass.

The word surma is also a common surname in the Ukrainian population.

== See also ==
- Ukrainian folk music

== Sources ==
- Humeniuk, A. - Ukrainski narodni muzychni instrumenty - Kyiv: Naukova dumka, 1967
- Mizynec, V. - Ukrainian Folk Instruments - Melbourne: Bayda books, 1984
- Cherkaskyi, L. - Ukrainski narodni muzychni instrumenty // Tekhnika, Kyiv, Ukraine, 2003 - 262 pages. ISBN 966-575-111-5
