= Kalatalo =

Ukrainian folk instrument

- Classification: Idiophone
- Hornbostel–Sachs classification: 111.1

Related instruments
- Ratchet; Semantron

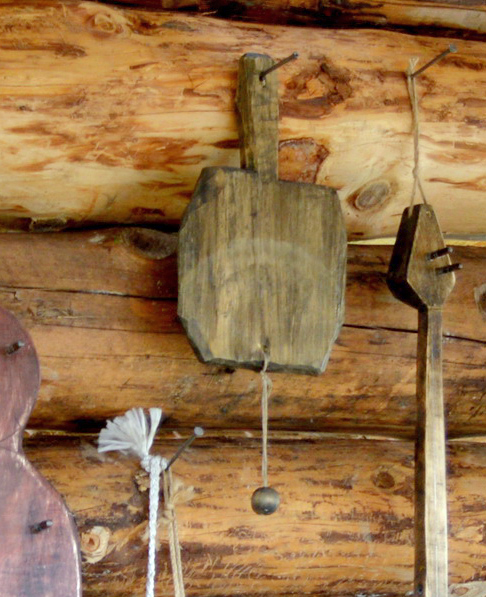

The kalatalo (Ukrainian: калатало) (also known as kalatailo, kalatalka, torokhkalo, stukalo, stukalka, torokhkavka, klepalo, bovkalo) is a Ukrainian folk instrument used in folk ensembles whenever a drum or tambourine is not available. It was also used by night guards to scare away intruders. In Galicia, the kalatalo is used instead of bells during Good Friday.

The instrument is made from a piece of wood with a handle. A second piece of wood shorter than the first is joined to the original piece by metal rings near from the handle. A hole is drilled through both pieces at one end and a wooden bolt is placed through the hole so that the additional piece can move a small distance. When the instrument is spun around it produces a very loud sound amplified by the stillness of the night.

A variant of the torokhkalo is the klepach that consists of a wooden hammer on an axis which is swung from one side to the other.

== See also ==
- Ukrainian folk music

== Sources ==
- Humeniuk, A. - Ukrainski narodni muzychni instrumenty - Kyiv: Naukova dumka, 1967
- Mizynec, V. - Ukrainian Folk Instruments - Melbourne: Bayda books, 1984
- Cherkaskyi, L. - Ukrainski narodni muzychni instrumenty // Tekhnika, Kyiv, Ukraine, 2003 - 262 pages. ISBN 966-575-111-5
