= Dergach =

Dergach (Russian: Дергач) may refer to:

- Mount Dergach in Antarctica
- Vladimir Dergach (born 1957), Russian football player and coach
- Bora-class guided missile hovercraft, named Dergach by NATO

== See also ==
- Derkach
