= The First Moderns =

1997 book by William Everdell

The First Moderns: Profiles in the Origins of Twentieth-Century Thought
- First edition
- Author: William R. Everdell
- Language: English
- Subject: Modernism, philosophy, mathematics, history of ideas, art history
- Publisher: University of Chicago Press
- Publication date: 1997
- Publication place: United States
- Pages: 501
- ISBN: 0-226-22480-5
- OCLC: 45733213

The First Moderns: Profiles in the Origins of Twentieth-Century Thought is a book on Modernism by the historian William Everdell, published in 1997 by the University of Chicago Press. A New York Times Notable Book of 1997, and included by the New York Public Library on its list of "25 Books to Remember from 1997", The First Moderns suggests that "the heart of Modernism is the postulate of ontological discontinuity".

== Background and overview ==
Everdell, dean of humanities at Saint Ann's School in Brooklyn Heights, posits that Modernism first emerged in the field of mathematics rather than the arts, specifically in the work of the German mathematician Richard Dedekind, who, in 1872, demonstrated that mathematicians operate without a continuum. This represents the formalization of Everdell's axiom of "ontological discontinuity", which he goes on to examine in a multiplicity of contexts. He examines this emerging framework of discreteness in science (Ludwig Boltzmann's mechanics, Cajal's neuroscience, Hugo de Vries' conception of the gene and Max Planck's quantum work, Albert Einstein's physics), mathematics, logic and philosophy (Georg Cantor, Gottlob Frege, Bertrand Russell and the linguistic turn, Husserl and the beginnings of phenomenology), in addition to the arts (James Joyce's novels, Picasso's Les Demoiselles d'Avignon, Schoenberg's 12-tone music).

== Reviews ==
Critics largely reviewed The First Moderns favorably, appreciating Everdell's interdisciplinary approach, in publications including the New York Review of Books, the New York Times, the Los Angeles Times and the Washington Post. The Pulitzer Prize-winning book critic Michael Dirda considers it among his "favorites".
