= Dentsivka =

Woodwind musical instrument with a fipple

- Classification: Aerophone
- Hornbostel–Sachs classification: 421.221-12

Playing range
- c^{3}-g^{5}

The dentsivka (Ukrainian: Денцівка) is a woodwind musical instrument with a fipple (mouthpiece). In traditional instruments, the tuning varies with the length of the tube. It is made in a variety of different sizes: the piccolo (tuned in F), prima (in C), alto (in G), tenor (in F), and bass (in C).

Two varieties of the instrument are the dvodentsivka and the pivtoradentsivka.

== Description ==
The dentsivka is a woodwind musical instrument. It differs from a sopilka in that, like the western European recorder, it has a fipple (mouthpiece), and so is classified as a duct flute.

A dentsivka is made from a tube of wood approximately 30 to 40 centimetres (12 to 16 in) long. Tone holes are cut (or burnt) into the tube and the fipple is made at one end. If the fipple is on the top of the instrument on the same plane as the playing holes, instead of the underside, the instrument is technically a kosa dudka (Ukrainian: Коса дудка), though the distinction is not often made. The internal diameter is usually 12 to 14 millimetres (0.47 to 0.55 in), with the walls of the tube being 2 to 3 millimetres (0.079 to 0.118 in) thick. In traditional instruments, the tuning varies with the length of the tube. The notes produced are usually diatonic, with a range of two and a half octaves.

Some dentsivkas from Western Ukraine have five tone holes. In recent times, chromatic ten-hole fingering has been developed for this instrument that has carried on to most of the other instruments in the sopilka family.

The dentsivka is made in a variety of different sizes: the piccolo (tuned in F), prima (in C), alto (in G), tenor (in F), and bass (in C).

== Dvodentsivka and pivtoradentsivka ==
The dvodentsivka is made by joining two dentsivkas together into one instrument.

The pivtoradentsivka (Ukrainian: Півтораденцівка) consists of two dentsivkas joined together, but with only one of the pipes having fingerholes, the other acting as a drone. The drone pipe in a pivtoradentsivka is usually shorter than the playing pipe. The instrument has the same fingering as the standard dentsivka.

== See also ==
- Ukrainian folk music
