= Surna =

Surna may refer to:

- Surna (Norway), a river in Møre og Romsdal county, Norway
- Zurna or Surna, a multinational outdoor wind instrument
- Sorna or Surna, an ancient Iranian woodwind instrument
- Surna River, a river in Nepal
- Antanas Šurna (1940-2014), Lithuanian actor
