= Skripka =

Skripka or Skrypka is a surname, meaning "violin" in Russian and Ukrainian. Notable people with this surname include:

- Anna Skripka, Ukrainian-American mathematician
- Oleh Skrypka (born 1964), Ukrainian musician
- Sergei Skripka, Soviet and Russian music conductor
- Sergey Skripka (born 1950), Soviet middle-distance runner
