= Tulumbas =

Coordinates: 49°08′45.1″N 32°15′31.2″E

Memorial sign "Tulumbas" (Ukrainian: Пам'ятний знак "Склик") is a memorial to nature and history created for the National Historical-Cultural Reserve "Chyhyryn", located in the Kholodnyi Yar reserve. A large round copper cooking vessel was fixed to a big oak tree at this historical place long ago. A strong ringing was heard at a long distance when somebody would hit against the vessel with a stick. The sound convened local Cossacks for a meeting. Recently, a drum (tulumtas) made of granite was established here as a monument to local avengers and their leader Maksym Zaliznyak.

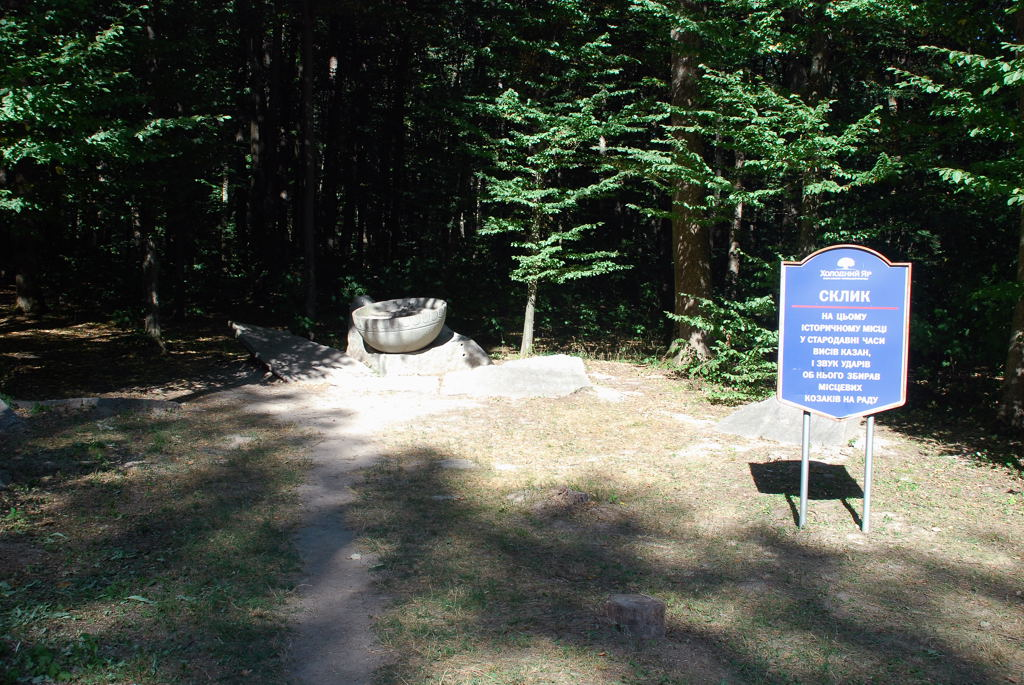
Memorial sign "Tulumbas"
