= Thomas Forrest Kelly =

American musicologist

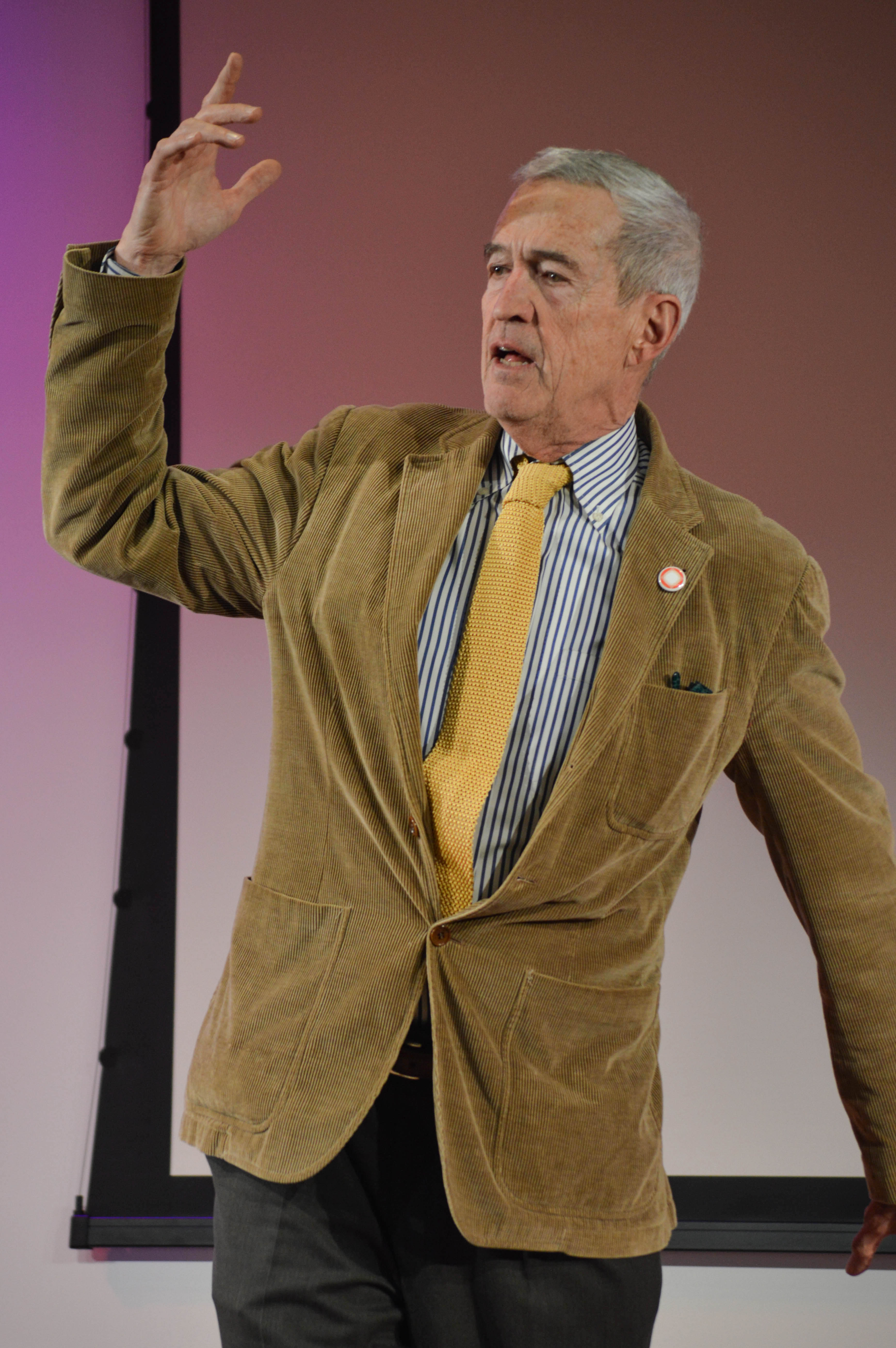
Thomas Forrest Kelly, 2015

Thomas Forrest Kelly (born April 20, 1943) is an American musicologist, musician, and scholar. He is the Morton B. Knafel Professor of Music at Harvard University. His most recent books include: Melisma: Wordless Song in Medieval Chant (2025), The Role of the Scroll (2019), Capturing Music: The Story of Notation (2014), and Music Then and Now (2012).

== Career ==
Thomas Forrest Kelly was born in Greensboro, North Carolina. He attended Groton School, and the University of North Carolina at Chapel Hill (A. B. 1964). Two years in France on a Fulbright grant allowed him to study organ with Jean Langlais privately and at the Schola Cantorum de Paris (diplôme de virtuosité 1966), and the Royal Academy of Music (LRAM 1964). His graduate study was at Harvard University (A. M. 1970, PhD 1973).

Kelly was Morton B. Knafel Professor of Music at Harvard University from 1994 to 2018, and served as Chair of the Music Department from 1999 to 2004. In 2005 he was named a Harvard College Professor in recognition of his teaching of undergraduates. Before coming to Harvard he taught at Oberlin Conservatory (where he was the director of the program in Historical Performance and served as acting Dean of the Conservatory); he taught at the Five College Consortium in Massachusetts (Amherst, Smith, Mount Holyoke, Hampshire Colleges and the University of Massachusetts), where he was the founding director of the Five College Early Music Program. From 1972 to 1979 he taught at Wellesley College. He was a visiting scholar at King's College, Cambridge (1976–77) and a Professeur invité at the École pratique des hautes études, Paris (1998). After retiring from Harvard, he has taught historical performance at the Juilliard School in New York.

== Honors ==
Kelly is a Chevalier of the Ordre des Arts et des Lettres of the French Republic, 2010. He is a Fellow of the American Academy of Arts and Sciences, the American Academy in Rome, and the Medieval Academy of America. He has held awards from the National Endowment for the Humanities and the American Council of Learned Societies (twice). His book The Beneventan Chant (Cambridge, 1989) was awarded the Otto Kinkeldey Award of the American Musicological Society for the most distinguished work of musicological scholarship of 1989. He received a Distinguished Alumnus Award from the University of North Carolina at Chapel Hill in 2005. Kelly also is an honorary citizen of the city of Benevento (Italy).

== Musical activities ==
In addition to the performance and conducting connected with his teaching, Kelly was the Artistic Director of the Castle Hill Festival (Massachusetts, 1973–1983); the Director of the International Early Dance and Music Institute (1982–1984), and the Music Director of the Cambridge Society for Early Music (1977–1978).

== Publications ==
Kelly has two principal areas of interest: medieval music and culture, and the performance of music of the past (often called Early Music or Historical Performance). He is a frequent lecturer and broadcaster. He has given regular series of talks for the Metropolitan Museum of Art, the New York Philharmonic, the Smithsonian Institution, the Los Angeles Philharmonic, and others. He has had a regular radio show, and well as many guest appearances.

=== Books for general readers ===
- The Role of the Scroll: An Illustrated Introduction to Scrolls in the Middle Ages (New York: W. W. Norton, 2019.)
- Capturing Music. The Story of Notation (New York: W. W. Norton, 2014.)
- First Nights: Five Musical Premieres (Yale University Press, 2000.)
- First Nights at the Opera (Yale University Press, 2004; paperback edition 2006.)
- Early Music: A Very Short Introduction. (Oxford University Press, 2011. German edition 2014.)
- Music Then and Now. (New York: W. W. Norton, 2012.)

=== Scholarly books ===
- The Beneventan Chant (Cambridge University Press, 1989)
  - Awarded the Otto Kinkeldey Prize of the American Musicological Society. Paperback edition 2009; Italian translation in press.
- The Exultet in Southern Italy (Oxford University Press, New York, 1996)
- The Ordinal of Montecassino and Benevento: Breviarium sive ordo officiorum, 11th century (Spicilegium Friburgense 45, Freiburg (Switzerland), Presses Universitaires, 2008)
- Les témoins manuscrits du chant bénéventain: le répertoire subsistant de l'ancienne liturgie de l'Italie du sud reproduit d'après tous les témoins manuscrits connus (Paléographie musicale, Volume XXI. Solesmes: Abbaye Saint-Pierre, 1992.)
- The Practice of Medieval Music. (Ashgate Variorum series, 2010. First of two volumes of reprints.)
- The Sources of Benevantan Chant. (Ashgate Variorum series, 2011. Second of two volumes of reprints.)
- Melisma: Wordless Song in Medieval Chant (Oxford University Press, 2025)

=== Books edited by Kelly ===
- The Cambridge History of Medieval Music. Co-edited with Mark Everist (Cambridge University Press, 2018.)
- Ambrosiana at Harvard. Co-edited with Matthew Mugmon. (Harvard University Press, 2010.)
- The Century of Bach and Mozart: Perspectives on Historiography, Composition, Theory, and Performance, in Honor of Christoph Wolff Co-edited with Sean Gallagher. (Harvard University Department of Music, 2009, paperback edition 2009.)
- Music in Medieval Europe (Ashgate, 2009.)
  - A 7-volume reference and reprint series of which Kelly is general editor and editor for the two volumes below.
  - Oral and Written Transmission in Chant. (Ashgate 2009)
  - Chant and its Origins (Ashgate 2009).
- La Cathédrale de Bénévent, sous la direction de Thomas Forrest Kelly, Esthétiques et Rituels des Cathédrales d'Europe (Ghent and Amsterdam: Ludion, 1999.)
  - Kelly edited the volume and contributed the introduction and one chapter.
- Plainsong in the Age of Polyphony. Essays edited and with an introduction by Thomas Forrest Kelly. (Cambridge University Press, 1992; paperback edition 2009.)

Kelly has also published more than 50 scholarly articles.
