= Basolia =

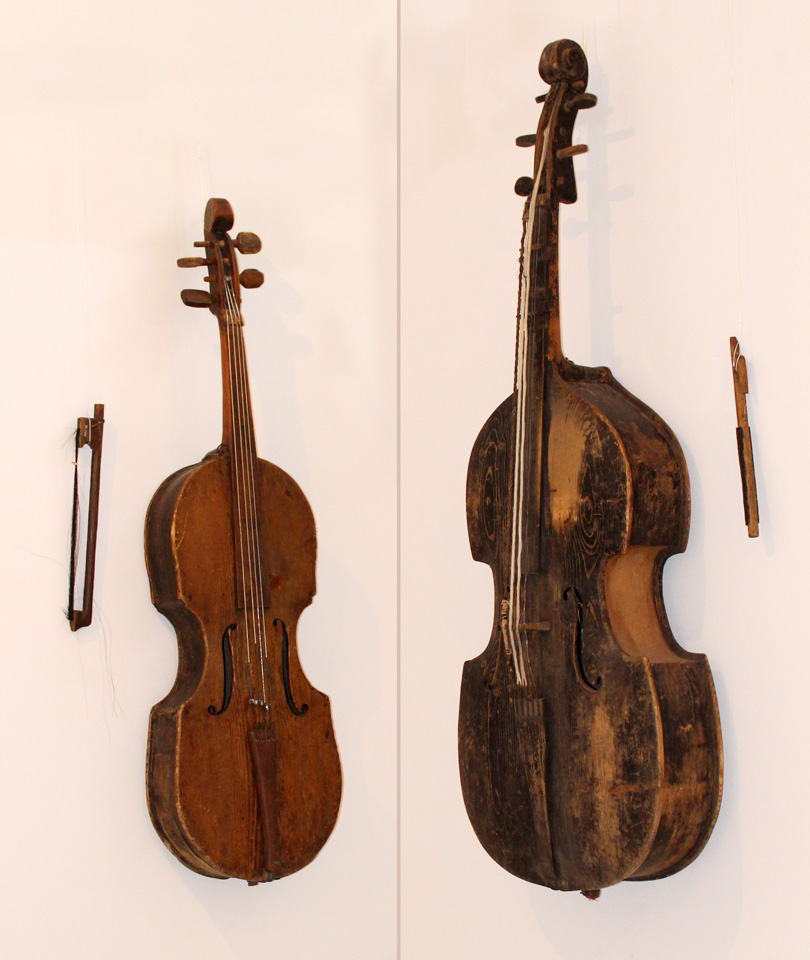
- Classification: Chordophone
- Hornbostel–Sachs classification: 321.321-71

Playing range
- c^{2}-g^{5}

Related instruments
- Cello; Viola da gamba; Hudok; Kozobas; Double Bass; Ütőgardon

The basolia (Ukrainian: басоля; Polish: basy or basetla) is a Ukrainian and Polish folk instrument of the bowed string family similar to the cello, although usually slightly larger and not as sophisticated in construction. The basolia was usually homemade and of very rough construction. Sometimes the soundboard was sewn to the body rather than glued. The strings are tuned in fifths.

Three different types are found in Ukraine:

- 1) 3 string found in Boiko ethnic area. The strings are usually plucked.
- 2) 4 string in central Ukraine. The strings are usually played with a bow.
- 3) 5 string from Transcarpathia. The strings are usually hit with a stick.

In Poland, the basolia has 2-4 strings, which are usually played with a bow.

The basolia is used in Ukrainian folk music ensembles known as Troyista muzyky (literally Trio music). It is now rarely found, almost totally replaced by the standard cello in Ukraine, or by the accordion in Poland.

The basolia was an instrument that was often ridiculed for its quality of sound and the skill of the player. All the same, wedding music without it was unthinkable. The basolia was introduced into Ukraine from the West after the fiddle had established itself, however, there are mentions which date back to the 17th century in descriptions of the wedding of Bohdan Khmelnytsky's son Yuri, where an orchestra using this instrument entertained the guests.

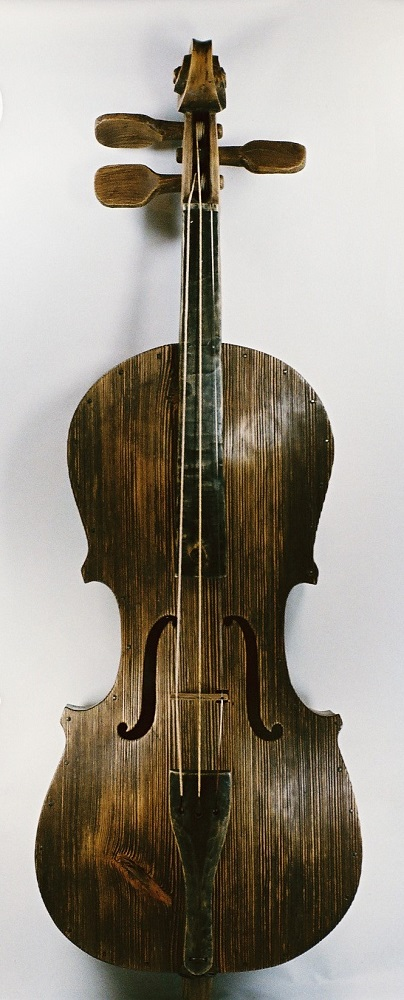
Polish basolia from Ołobok

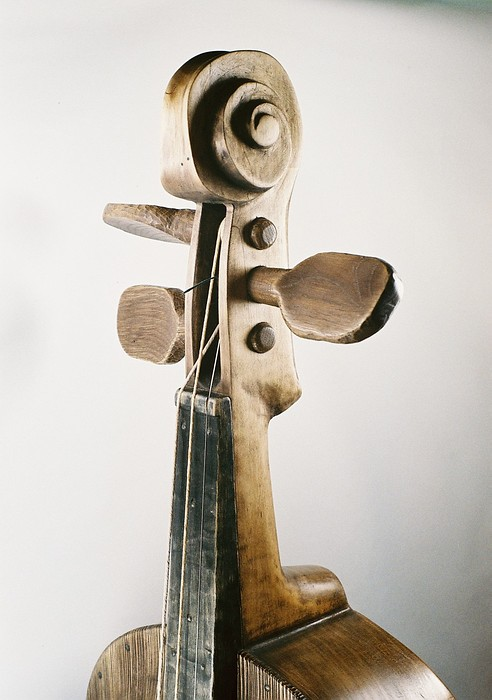

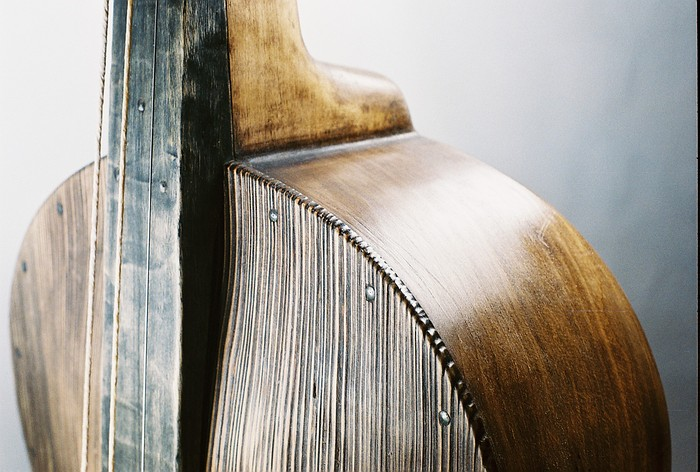

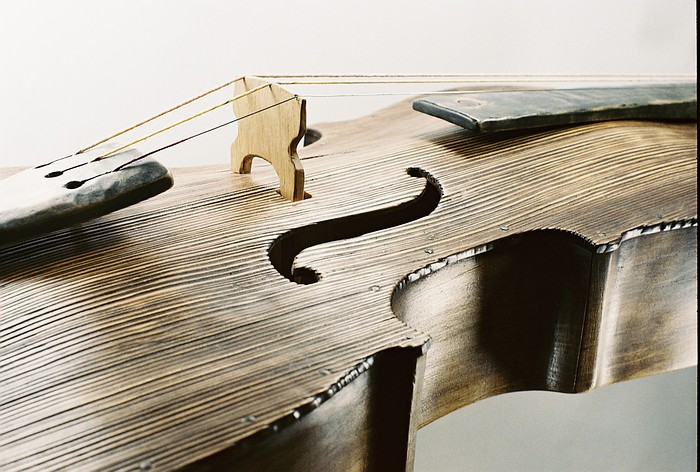

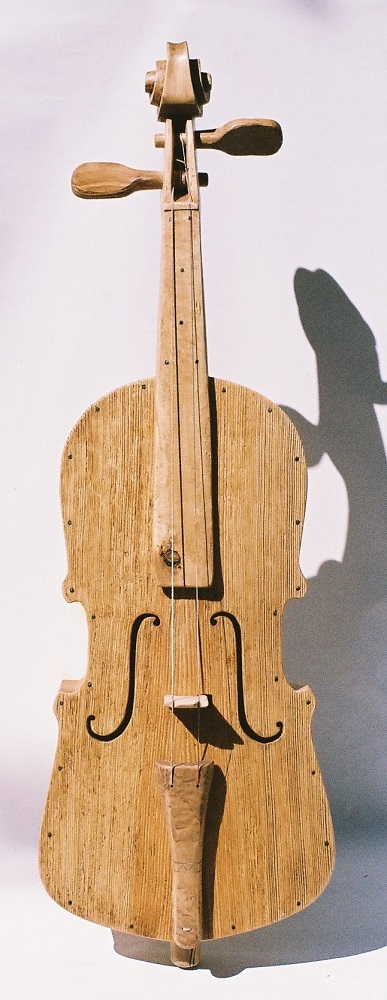
Polish basolia from Przystajnia

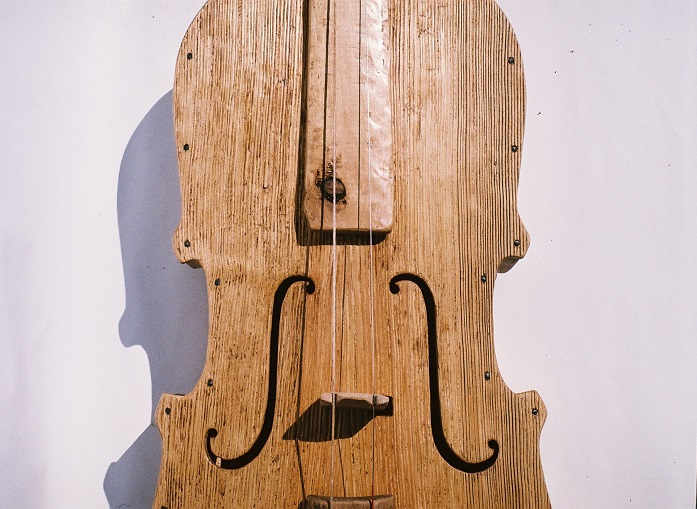

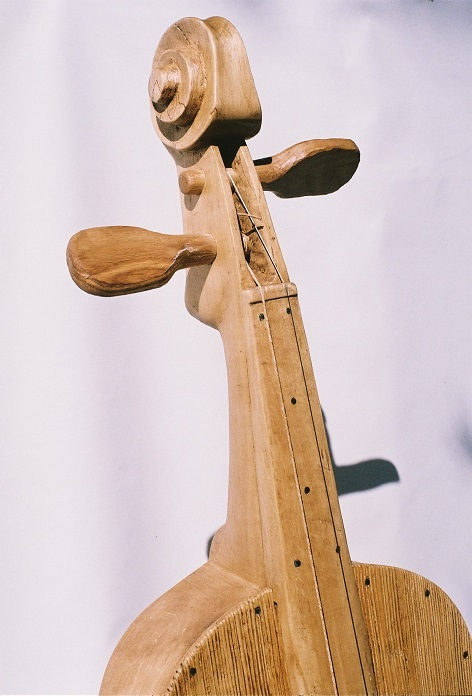

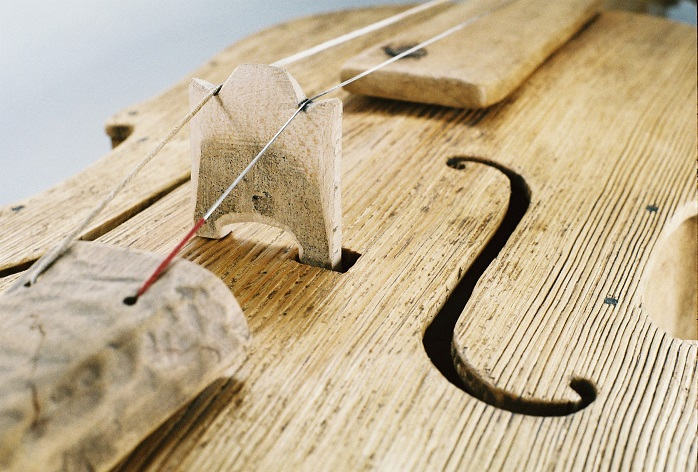

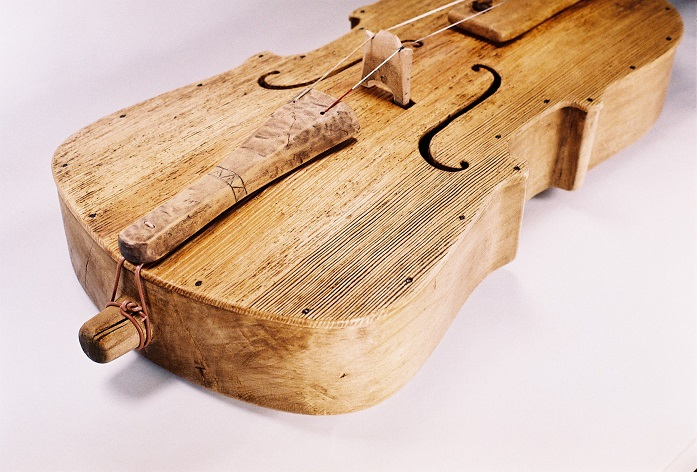

== See also ==
- Ukrainian folk music

== Sources ==
- Humeniuk, A. - Ukrainski narodni muzychni instrumenty - Kyiv: Naukova dumka, 1967
- Mizynec, V. - Ukrainian Folk Instruments - Melbourne: Bayda books, 1984
- Cherkaskyi, L. - Ukrainski narodni muzychni instrumenty // Tekhnika, Kyiv, Ukraine, 2003 - 262 pages. ISBN 966-575-111-5
