= William Everdell =

American teacher and author (born 1941)

William Romeyn Everdell is an American teacher and author. He is Dean of Humanities, emeritus, at Saint Ann's School.

== Biography ==
Born on June 25, 1941, he graduated from St. Paul's School and from Princeton University in 1964. A Woodrow Wilson Scholar and Fulbright Scholar, he holds a master's degree in history from Harvard University and a 1971 Ph.D. from New York University. Everdell's dissertation, later published in book form, is notable for being the first work to place Jean-Jacques Rousseau within the Counter-Enlightenment, according to Graeme Garrard.

In 1970, he began teaching at Saint Ann's School in Brooklyn, where he taught world history until retiring in 2016. He has been a regular contributor to the New York Times Book Review, and is the author of a number of books and articles on intellectual history and the history of ideas. One book, The End of Kings (1983, 2000) recaptures the historical definition of "republic" as a state not ruled by one person. Another, The First Moderns (1997) redefines "Modernism" as the abandonment of the continuous in favor of the discrete in the arts and sciences that began in the West in 1872–1913. The New York Times included The First Moderns on its list of "notable books of the year" for 1997. In 2021 Springer published his The Evangelical Counter-Enlightenment, which uses biographical profiles to argue that Wahhabi Islam, Hasidic Judaism, and "Evangelical" Protestant Christianity, which arose nearly simultaneously in the middle of the 18th century CE, are best understood as aspects of what Isaiah Berlin called the Counter-Enlightenment.

He has also written on the teaching of history, edited the historical section of the website of the New England Society in the City of Brooklyn and served on the Test Development Committee for the first Advanced Placement World History Exams. A member of the American Historical Association, he has also served as the president of the affiliated Organization of History Teachers, and of the East-Central American Society for Eighteenth-Century Studies.

His wife, Barbara, was a longtime administrator at Saint Ann's, and together they have two sons, Josh and Chris.

== Publications ==
- "The Rosières Movement, 1766-1789: A Clerical Precursor of the Revolutionary Cults", French Historical Studies 9:1, 1975
- The End of Kings: A History of Republics and Republicans, The Free Press, 1983 (2nd edition, University of Chicago Press, 2000)
- Christian Apologetics in France, 1730-1790: The Roots of Romantic Religion, Edwin Mellen Press, 1987.
- "The Problem of Continuity and the Origins of Modernism: 1870-1913", History of European Ideas, Pergamon Press, 1988.
- "From State to Freestate: The Meaning of the Word Republic from Jean Bodin to John Adams" (7th ISECS, Budapest, 7/31/87) in Valley Forge Journal, June, 1991 http://dhm.pdp6.org/archives/wre-republics.html and in Humanities Commons
- "Complots, Côteries, Conspirations: L'origine de la 'thèse Barruel' dans le roman apologétique" (7/6/89) in L'Image de la Révolution française: Communications présentées lors du Congrès Mondial..., vol III, Paris, 1989
- "Monologues of the Mad: Paris Cabaret and Modernist Narrative from Twain to Eliot" (ISSEI, Aalborg, Denmark, 8/25/92) in Studies in American Fiction, 20:2(Dec, 1992)
- The First Moderns: Profiles in the Origins of Twentieth Century Thought, University of Chicago Press, 1997. (Paperback Edition 1998)
- "Modernism at 100", Prometheus I:1(1998–99)
- Review of Taves, Fits, Trances and Visions in New York Times Book Review, (26 December 1999)
- Review of Banfield, The Phantom Table: Woolf, Fry, Russell and the Epistemology of Modernism, in Russell: Journal of Bertrand Russell Studies, NS v21:1 (Summer 2001), p88
- "How to Use the Theme of Technology in a World History Survey Course", American Historical Association, San Francisco, 5 January 2002, revised, in World History Connected.
- "Enlightenment: A Rhetoric of Suspicion", St. Ann's Review 5:1(Winter/Spring, 2004), p22-33
- "How Much Is That In Dollars? Teaching World Economic History Starting With What Students Most Want To Know", Organization of History Teachers/American Historical Association, Conference, DC, January, 2004
- The Evangelical Counter-Enlightenment: From Ecstasy to Fundamentalism in Christianity, Judaism, and Islam in the 18th Century, Springer, 2021.
- "Real Persons on Coins: Ominous Precedents and a Paleofeminist Plea", 2020 in Substack & & and in Humanities Commons
