= Rih (instrument) =

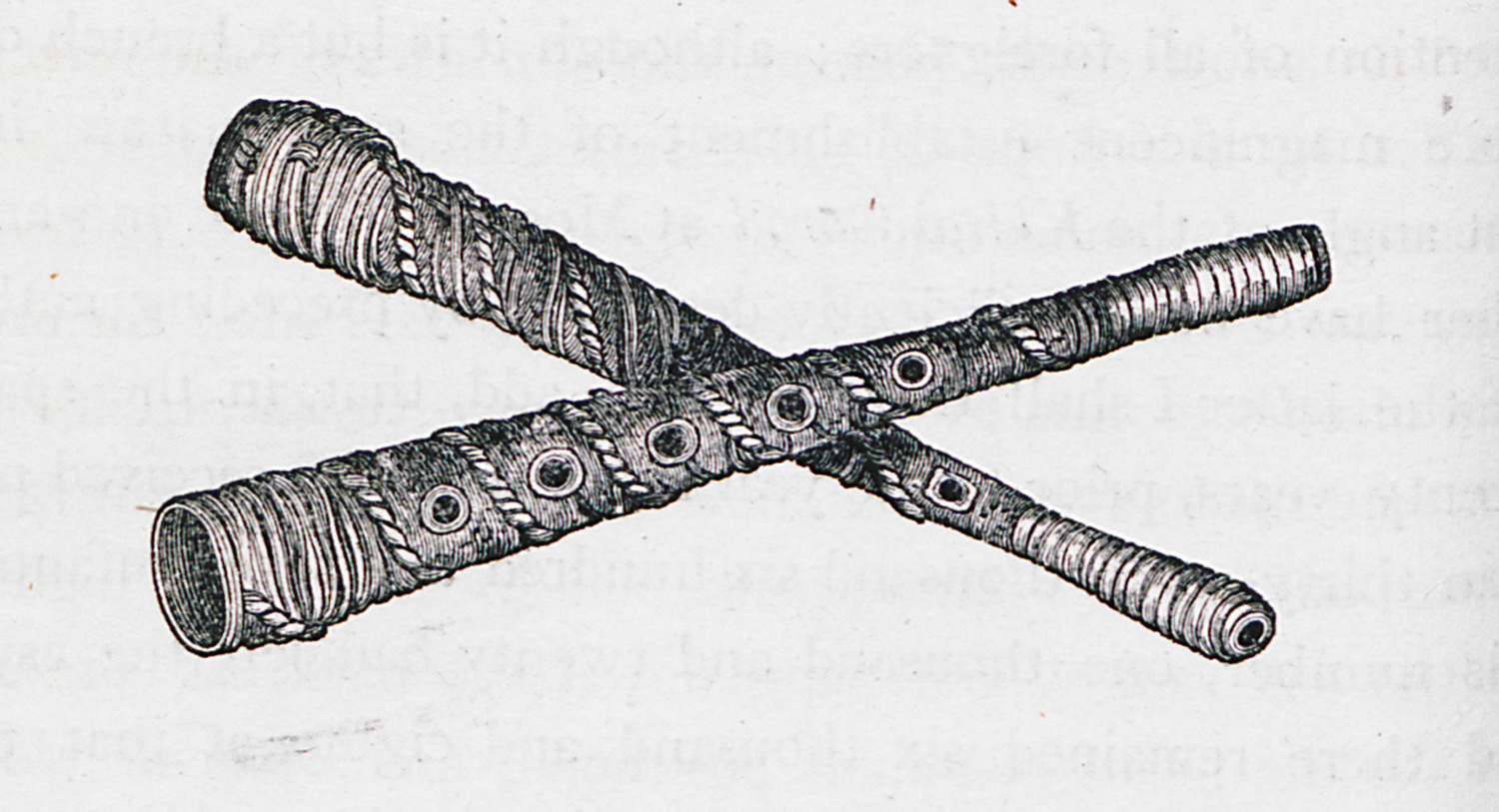
- Classification: Aerophone
- Hornbostel–Sachs classification: 421.211.2

Playing range
- c^{3}-g^{5}

Related instruments
- Rizhok; Lihava; Cossack horn; Hornpipe

The rih (Ukrainian: ріг, "horn"; Russian: рожок) is an instrument that was popular in Eastern Ukraine and Russia, with between three and six fingerholes. Usually they were made from a cylindrical reed with a cow's horn to form the bell. The mouthpiece usually has a single reed although occasionally double reed instruments can be found.

== See also ==
- Kryvyi Rih ("Curved Horn")
- Mykytyn Rih ("Mykytyn's Horn", the original name of Nikopol, Ukraine
- Ukrainian folk music
- Russian traditional music
- Erke
- Erkencho

== Sources ==
- Humeniuk, A. - Ukrainski narodni muzychni instrumenty - Kyiv: Naukova dumka, 1967
- Mizynec, V. - Ukrainian Folk Instruments - Melbourne: Bayda books, 1984
- Cherkaskyi, L. - Ukrainski narodni muzychni instrumenty // Tekhnika, Kyiv, Ukraine, 2003 - 262 pages. ISBN 966-575-111-5
