= Derkach =

Derkach (Cyrillic: Деркач, Ukrainian pronunciation) is a Ukrainian surname meaning a ratchet, noisemaker. Notable people with the surname include:

- Andrii Derkach (born 1967), Ukrainian politician and businessman
- Andriy Derkach (footballer) (born 1985), Ukrainian footballer
- Borys Derkach (1964−2019), Soviet and Ukrainian footballer
- Dariya Derkach (born 1993), Italian triple jumper and long jumper
- Len Derkach (born 1945), Canadian politician
- Leonid Derkach (1939−2022), Ukrainian politician, father of Andrii
- Sergei Derkach (born 1966), Russian football player and coach
- Volodymyr Derkach (born 1957), Ukrainian musician
- Vyacheslav Derkach (born 1976), Ukrainian biathlete
- Yana Derkach (born 1998), Ukrainian footballer

== See also ==
- Dergach
