= List of ensemble formations in traditional Chinese music =

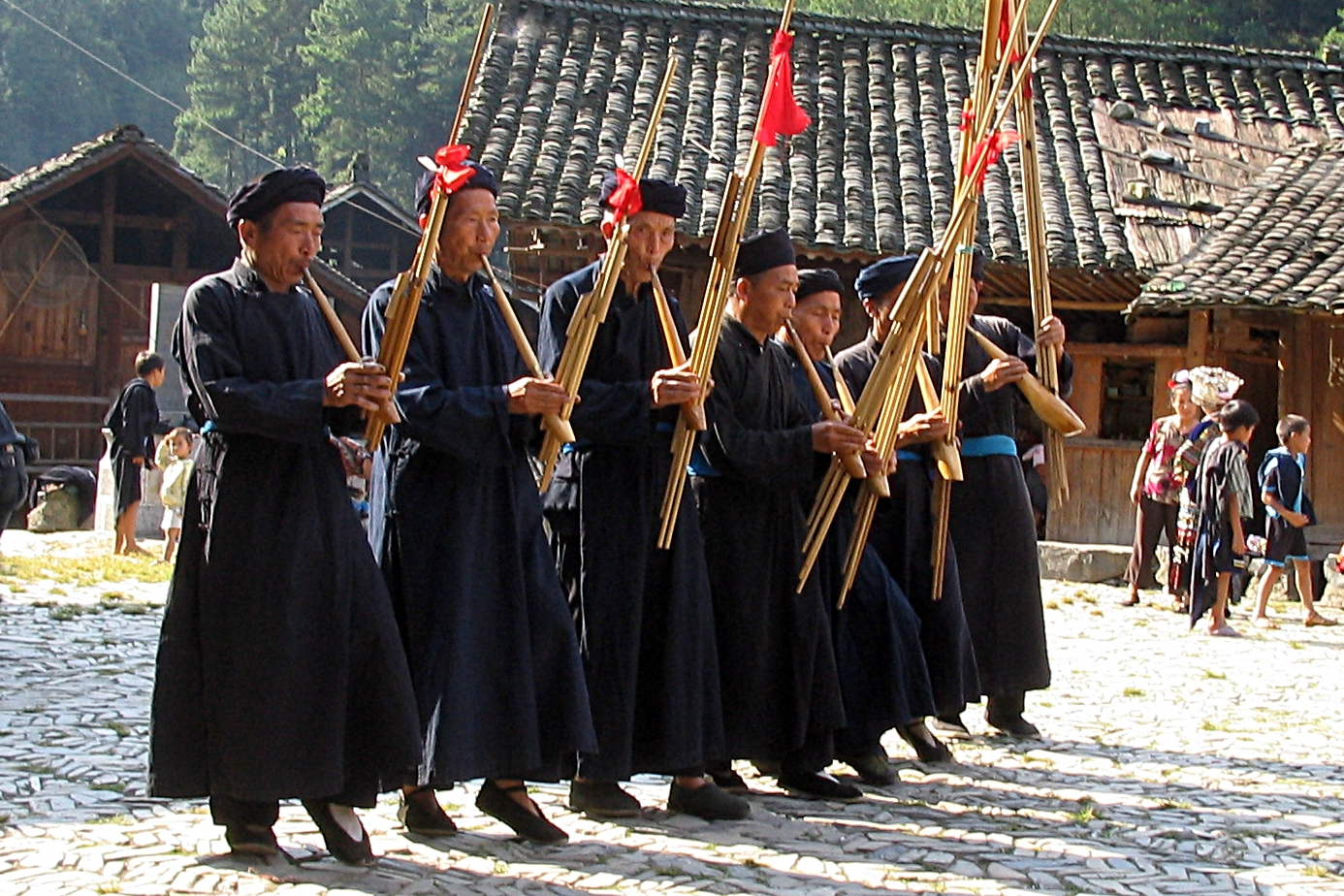
Miao (Hmong)-Musicians of Guizhou are playing in a Lusheng-Ensemble

This is a list of ensemble formations in traditional Chinese music:

== Luogu and drum ensembles ==
Luogu (锣鼓; pinyin: luógǔ; literally "gongs and drums") are Chinese percussion ensembles, which are typically made up of several different types of drums (鼓; pinyin: gǔ) and several different types of metal idiophones, usually including gongs (鑼/锣; pinyin: luó) and cymbals (鈸; pinyin: bó). Such ensembles sometimes play in juxtaposition with melodic ensembles. There are also ensembles that consist solely of drums.

- Chaozhou luogu (潮州锣鼓) - gong and drum music of Chaozhou (in Guangdong Province)
  - Chaozhou da luogu (潮州大锣鼓) - big gong and drum music of Chaozhou
  - Chaozhou xiao luogu (潮州小锣鼓) - small gong and drum music of Chaozhou
- Shifan luogu (十番锣鼓) - ten sound variations of gongs and drums (from southern Jiangsu Province)
- Sichuan naonian luogu (四川闹年锣鼓) - gong and drum music performed for the celebration of the Chinese New Year in Sichuan Province
- Sunan shifan luogu (苏南十番锣鼓, see shifan luogu
- Tonggu ensemble (铜鼓) - bronze drum ensemble (cf. Dong Son drums)
- Zhedong luogu (浙东锣鼓) - gong and drum music of eastern Zhejiang Province

== Loud wind and percussion ensembles ==
Ensembles comprising loud wind instruments (including suona, guanzi, sheng, and sometimes also dizi, long straight brass trumpets, or string instruments) and the percussion instruments of the luogu ensemble are usually referred to as either guchui (literally "drumming [and] blowing") or chuida (literally "blowing [and] hitting") ensembles. Such ensembles traditionally perform outdoors, often while marching, for weddings, funerals, or (originally) military purposes. They include the following:

- Guchui ensemble (鼓吹) - drum and wind music
- Liaonan guchui (辽南鼓吹) - drum and wind music of southern Liaoning Province
- Longchui (笼吹) - casket winds; performed by suona, dongxiao, erxian, sanxian, large and small drums, gong, cymbals, and sometimes other instruments
- Shandong guchui (山东鼓吹) - drum and wind music of Shandong Province
- Shanxi badatao (山西八大套) - eight big pieces of Shanxi Province
- Sunan chuida (苏南吹打) - wind and percussion music of southern Jiangsu Province; also called Sunan shifangu (苏南十番鼓) or Shifangu (十番鼓)
- Xi'an guyue (西安鼓乐) - wind and percussion ensemble music of Xi'an (Shaanxi Province); also called Shaanxi guyue (陕西鼓乐)

== Silk and bamboo ensembles ==
Ensembles made up primarily of strings, flutes, and small percussion instruments are usually referred to as sizhu (丝竹; pinyin: sīzhú; literally "silk [and] bamboo") ensembles. They include:

- Chaozhou xianyue (潮州弦乐; literally "Chaozhou string music") - Chaozhou silk and bamboo ensemble
- Fuzhou shifan (福州十番) - ten sound variations of Fuzhou (in Fujian Province)
- Hakka sixian (客家丝弦; literally "Hakka silk string [music]") - Hakka silk and bamboo ensemble
- Hebei chuige (河北吹歌) - Hebei wind songs, see Jizhong guanyue
- Hengchui ensemble (横吹) - wind music
- Jiangnan sizhu (江南丝竹) - string and wind music from the region directly south of the Yangtze River, near Shanghai
- Jizhong chuige (冀中吹歌) - wind songs of central Hebei
- Jizhong guanyue (冀中管乐) - wind music of central Hebei
- Nanguan (南管; pinyin: nánguǎn; literally "southern pipe") - an instrumental genre originating in Fujian; also performed in Taiwan and Singapore; also called nanyin (南音), nanyue (南樂), or nanqu (南曲)

== Buddhist and Daoist ritual music ==
Once performed regularly at Buddhist and Daoist temples throughout China, since 1949 such music has experienced a significant decline, and may now be found at only a few temples in China and Taiwan.

- Jing yinyue (京音乐) - literally "capital music"; performed at the Zhihua Si Temple, a Ming dynasty-era Buddhist temple in Beijing . Instruments include guanzi, dizi, sheng, yunluo, cymbals, and drum, and (formerly) voice(s)

== Ancient Chinese orchestra ==
The ancient Chinese orchestra, which comprised up to several hundred or more traditional Chinese musical instruments of many types, existed from at least the Shang dynasty and performed yayue (雅樂) music for court rituals and sacrifices, as well as for entertainment of the court.

- Ancient Chinese orchestra

== Modern Chinese orchestra ==
The modern Chinese orchestra, comprising up to 100 or more traditional (or modernized traditional) Chinese musical instruments, as well as often cellos and double basses, was developed in the early 20th century.

- Modern Chinese orchestra

== Non-Han ensembles ==
Many ensembles are found only among China's 55 ethnic minorities. These include:

- Bayin (八音) - literally "eight sounds"; instrumental ensemble of the Zhuang people of Guangxi, which includes such instruments as the maguhu, tuhu, huluhu, sanxian, drums, and cymbals, as well as other instruments
- Lusheng ensemble (芦笙) - ensemble of lusheng mouth organs of various sizes (and sometimes also mangtong) performed by the Miao and Dong peoples of southern China

== See also ==
- List of traditional Chinese instruments
