= Taipinggu =

Chinese dance

Percussion instrument
- Classification: Drum
- Developed: Northern China

Related instruments
- Dangu

The Taipinggu (Chinese: 太平鼓; pinyin: tài píng gǔ) is a dance variety with hand-held drum; it is also known as Dangu (Chinese: 单鼓; pinyin: dān gǔ) and "Drums of Great Peace". It is popular in North China and commonly performed by the Manchu ethnic group for shamanist priests. As the years passed by, it became a way for people to express the joyfulness and happiness.

The Taipinggu was originated in the Tang dynasty and prospered in Qing Dynasty, with a history of more than 2,000 years. There are two widely known kinds of Taipinggu, one is in Western Beijing and another kind is invented in Lanzhou, China.

== Classification ==
The Jingxi Taipinggu (Chinese: 京西太平鼓; pinyin: jīng xī tài píng gǔ) is of folk dance for entertainment. With a widespread mass base and deep historical roots, it plays an important role in folk activities. Taipinggu had been popular in Western Beijing since the Ming Dynasty, and it became very popular in the early Qing Dynasty. In the late Qing Dynasty, taipinggu was spread to the Mentougou District. Almost everyone from many villages in Mentougou District was able to play the taipinggu historically. Taipinggu was played in the imperial palace on Chinese New Year's Eve, so it was also called "yingniangu (the drums played to welcome the Chinese New Year)" in Beijing. The time to play the taipinggu most is the twelfth and the first month of the lunar year. It is attractive and popular in local calendric folk customs, and people play it to express their best wishes for a time of peace and prosperity. Playing the taipinggu can not only enhance the festive atmosphere but also reflect the festive customs of Beijing area in a traditional way. Performing the Taipinggu is a symbol of the cultural identity of local people.

The Lanzhou Taipinggu (Chinese: 兰州太平鼓; pinyin: lán zhōu tài píng gǔ) in Gansu Province has been long known as the "crown of drum dances" worldwide, with a history of more than 600 years. It is popular in the Chinese cities such as Lanzhou, Yongdeng, Jiuquan, Zhangye, Jingyuan, etc. Lanzhou's Taipinggu is cylinder-shaped, with drum body 70–75 cm high, drumhead 45–50 cm long in diameter, and drum weight 19–22 kg. Its upper and lower surfaces are covered by cow leather, painted with such patterns as two dragons playing with a pearl. Its strap is long enough to be hungover shoulders, facilitating percussion and helping a drummer throw it to any direction.

== See also ==
- Bangu
- Huagu
- Yaogu
- Music of China
- Dance of China
- Traditional Chinese musical instruments
