= Military drums =

Drums used for military purposes

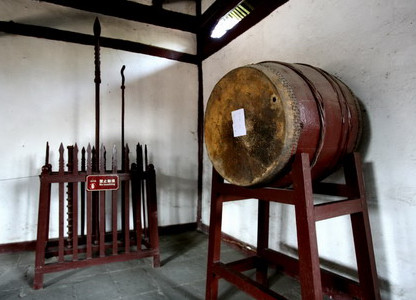
A Chinese zhangu.

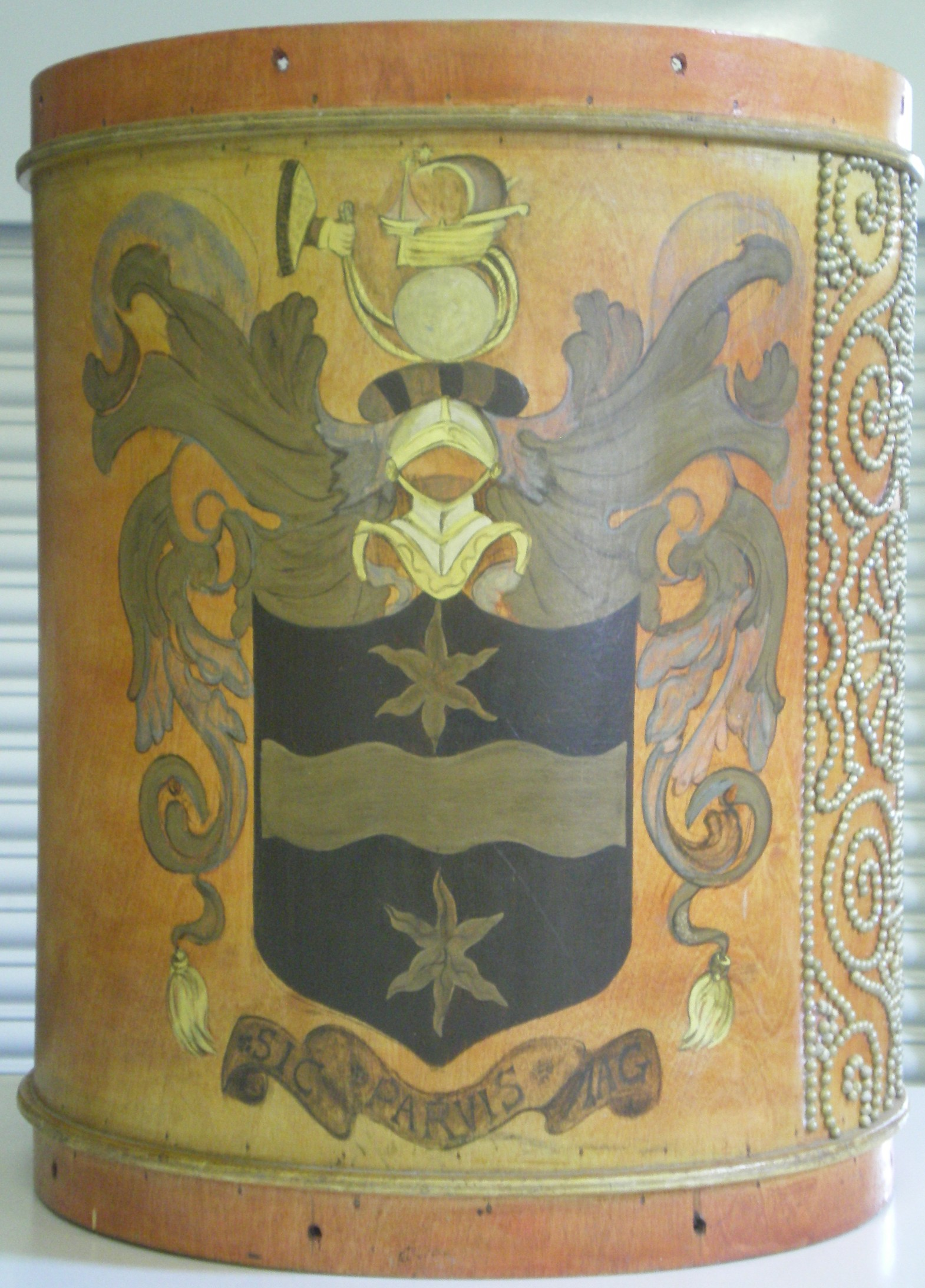
Replica of Drake's Drum, an icon of English folklore.

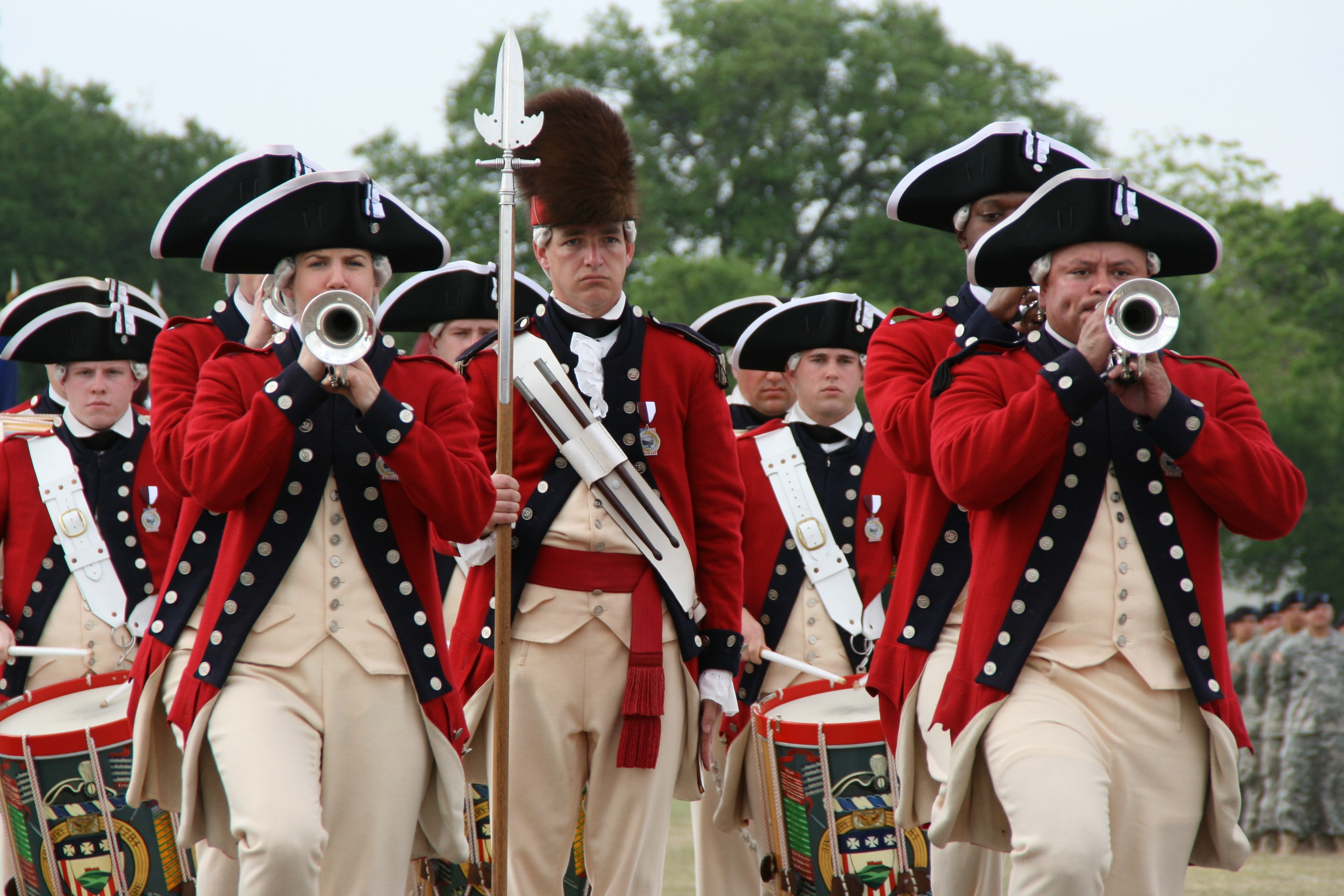
The Old Guard Fife and Drum Corps re-enacts a scene from the American Revolution.

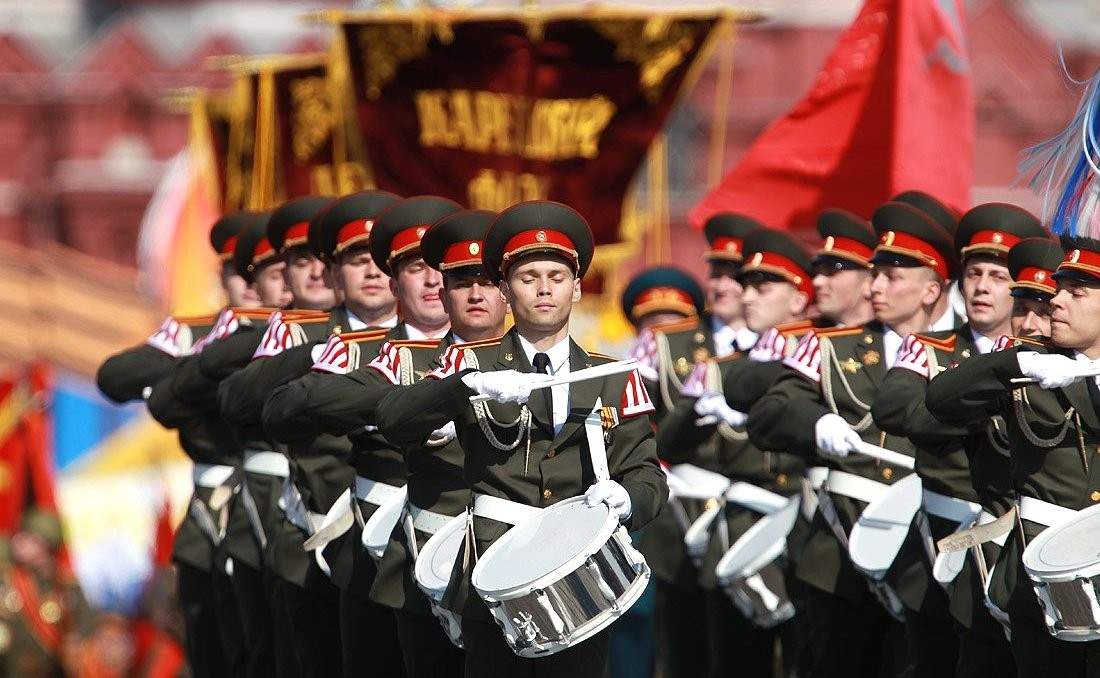
Russian military drummers, 2010

Military drums or war drums are all kinds of drums and membranophones that have been used for martial music, including military communications, as well as drill, honors music, and military ceremonies.

== History ==
Among ancient war drums that can be mentioned, the junjung was used by the Serer people in West Africa. The Rigveda describes the war drum as the fist of Indra.

In Europe during the Early Middle Ages, the Byzantine Empire made use of military drums to indicate marching and rowing cadence, as well as a psychological weapon on the battlefield since the Late Antiquity. However, in Western Europe, military drums were little observed until the time of the Crusades (p. 19) Western European armies likely first encountered drums used by Byzantine and Islamic military forces, the latter of whom used primarily their traditional kettledrums and in battle found that the sound would particularly affect the Crusaders' horses, which had not encountered them. By the early 13th century, Crusading armies began to adopt military drums and brought back the practice to the West.

The snare drum in particular began to be used in 13th-century Europe to rally troops, and to demoralize the enemy.

== Use for military signaling ==
A military tattoo was originally a drum signal for the soldiers' curfew. Other uses for military drums have been recruiting and calling for a parley.

The Ancient Fife and Drum Corps and modern drum corps have been used by early modern armies for signaling and ceremonies. They were occasionally played by drummer boys in conflicts such as the American Civil War.

== Early modern warfare ==
From the early 16th century onwards, drums became the usual means of passing orders on the European battlefield. Infantry and dragoons (mounted infantry) used side drums and heavy-cavalry kettle drums for that purpose in early modern warfare. Key signals by multiple or single drummers included "general, call, prepare, march, assemble, advance, retreat, etc."

== Final use in battle ==
At the outbreak of the First World War in August 1914, drums were still in use on active service by some of the more conservative European military forces. They included the Austro-Hungarian Army, whose infantry carried aluminium drums painted in pike grey during the early weeks of combat. The unsuitability of such musical instruments for modern warfare was quickly realised, and in September 1914, the drums were withdrawn, with the drummers transferred to other duties.

== Civilian music ==
Eventually, snare drums and timpani have been adopted into civilian classical and popular music.

== Metaphor ==
In modern times, the term war drums is used as a metaphor for preparation for war.

== See also ==
- Drummer (military)
- Fife (instrument)
- Carnyx
- Field music (military)
- March (music)
- Marching percussion
