= Hourglass drum =

Type of musical drum

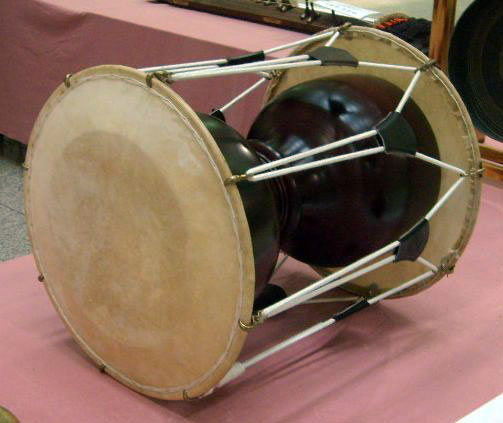
The janggu, a traditional Korean hourglass drum

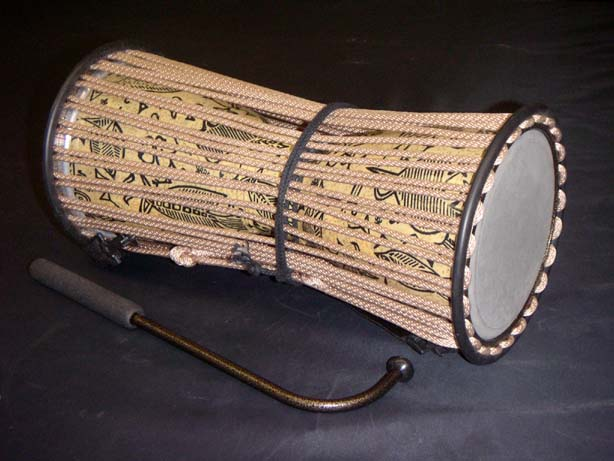
A West African talking drum

Hourglass drums are a sub-category of membranophone, or drum, characterized by an hourglass shape. They are also known as waisted drums. Drumheads are attached by laces, which may be squeezed during a performance to alter the pitch. The category also includes pellet drums such as the damaru, although not all pellet drums are hourglass shaped (such as the Korean do, nodo, noedo, and yeongdo, which are barrel shaped).

Hourglass drums exists in most regions of the world, but have very different construction methods, dimensions, purposes and playing methods. The label of hourglass drum is hence as generic as the label for bowed instrument or reed instrument. Thus the designation of Hourglass drum is used as a category in general instrument construction and does not refer to any particular uniform instrument.

== See also ==
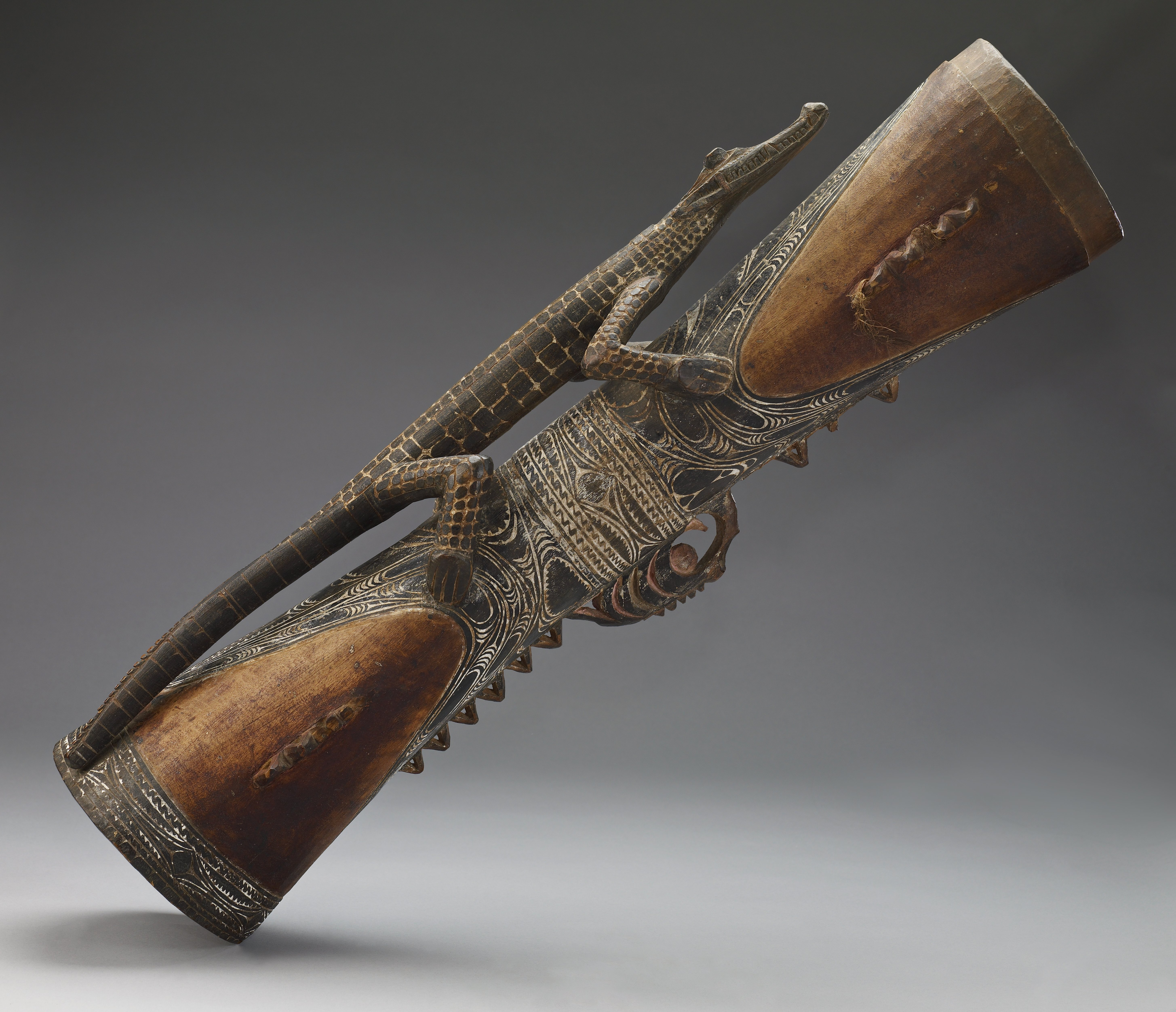
Kundu drum, from Papua-New Guinea, Iatmul people, 20th century. Covered with art that is spiritually significant to the Iatmul.

- Batá drum (Cuba, West Africa)
- Damaru (Indian subcontinent)
- Dekki (Sri Lanka)
- Dhad sarangi (India, Pakistan)
- Galgo (Korea)
- Idakka (India)
- Janggu (Korea)
- Jiegu (China)
- Kakko (Japan)
- Kundu (Papua New Guinea)
- Ōtsuzumi (Japan)
- Tsuzumi (also called kotsuzumi) (Japan)
- Talking drum also called dundun, kalangu, donno, or tama (West Africa)
- Trống sành (Vietnam)
- Udakki (Sri Lanka)
- Udukai (South India)
- Urumee (India)
