= Kokyū =

Traditional Japanese string instrument

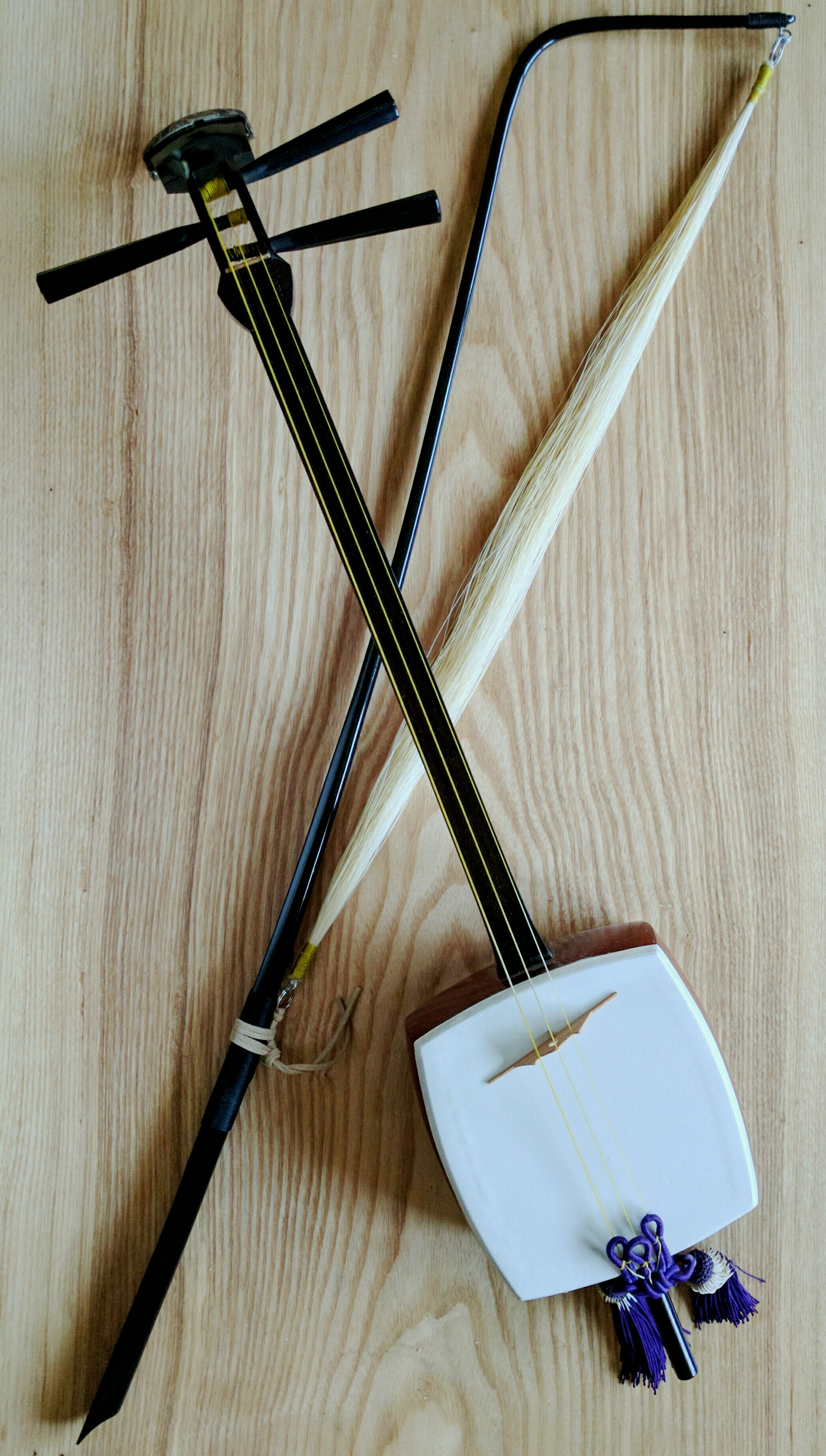
- A kokyū built by Masakichi Ueda c. 1920, Osaka, Japan
- Classification: Bowed string instrument

Related instruments
- Leiqin; Zhuihu

The kokyū (胡弓) is the only traditional Japanese string instrument played with a bow. A variant of the instrument also exists in Okinawa, called kūchō (胡弓) in Okinawan.

The kokyū, like the shamisen, has its origins in Okinawa. Although it is similar to Chinese huqin, it actually came to Okinawa via the rebab from Indonesia and Malaysia.

The kokyū is similar in construction to the shamisen, appearing as a smaller version of that instrument. In Okinawa, the body is round, while in mainland Japan, it is square like a shamisen. It has three (or, more rarely, four) strings and is played upright, with a horsehair-strung bow bowing the strings. It is often tuned the same as a shamisen but an octave higher. In central Japan, the kokyū was formerly used as an integral part of the sankyoku ensemble, along with the koto and shamisen, but beginning in the 20th century the shakuhachi began to play the role previously filled by the kokyū.

Since Shinei Matayoshi, a kokyū and sanshin musician and maker, invented and popularized a four-stringed version of the kokyū in order to expand the instrument's range, the kokyū has become much more popular. A kokyū society, dedicated to promoting the instrument, exists in Japan.

The kokyū has also been used in jazz and blues, with the American multi-instrumentalist Eric Golub pioneering the instrument's use in these non-traditional contexts. One of the few non-Japanese performers of the instrument, he has recorded as a soloist as well as with the cross-cultural jazz band of John Kaizan Neptune.

The kokyū is similar to two Chinese bowed lutes with fingerboards: the leiqin and the zhuihu. In Japanese, the term kokyū may refer broadly to any bowed string instrument of Asian origin, as does the Chinese term huqin. Thus, the Chinese erhu, which is also used by some performers in Japan, is sometimes described as a kokyū, along with the kūchō, leiqin, and zhuihu. The specific Japanese name for erhu is niko.

== See also ==
- Shamisen
- Sankyoku
- Leiqin
- Zhuihu
- Erhu
- Haegeum
