= Zhangu =

Traditional Chinese drum

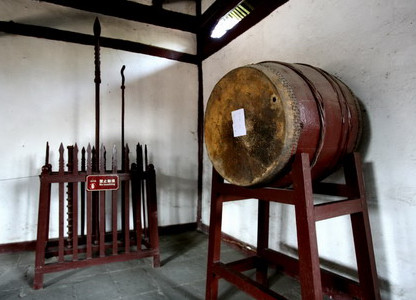
The photo of a Chinese war drum

The Zhangu (战鼓), or war drum, is a Chinese musical instrument. It is similar to the Tanggu (堂鼓) in appearance, but is lower in pitch, and known as the Biangu (扁鼓). It was an instrument used in ritual music and also popular with traditional wedding bands.

== Appearance ==
Zhangu has many different sizes according to its functions, generally, the diameter of the drumhead are 270mm, 330mm, 400mm, 460mm and 540mm and the height of the drum are usually 170mm, 200mm, 240mm, 300mm and 340mm. The drumhead is usually made of wood and leather; there are 2 to 4 metal rings at the waist of the drum. The player uses one or two sticks to play the drum. The Zhangu needs two men when played in the army march, with one man carrying the drum on his back and the other playing behind the first man.

== Mongolian War Drum ==
The Mongolia war drum was called Guangu (罐鼓) in the ancient times, also known as Dagu (大鼓) or Jungu (军鼓). Nowadays this instrument is still popular among the eastern area of Inner Mongolia. Mongolian war drum has long history dating back to Genghis Khan (1162-1227), it had been popularly used for ritual ceremony and warfare. The Italian traveler and merchant Marco Polo wrote in his The Travels of Marco Polo about the Mongolian military matters: "before they go to a battle, all soldiers wait for the sound of the Guangu from their commander. When the commander’s drum played, most of the soldiers will play their own instruments and sing".

There were cylinder-shaped and cone-shaped Mongolian war drums, the cylinder drum was placed on war chariot, while the cone drum was played by soldiers on the horses.
