= Paqin =

Chinese lute

The paqin (琶琴) is a modern bowed lute originating in China. The instrument has a pear-shaped wooden body like pipa, with neck no frets but bowed by horsehair bow. It is the tenor variant of the paquin family. It has a bass variant, the dapaqin and an alto variant is the xiaopaqin (小琶琴). This is a combination of Chinese pipa with western cello and violin.

== See also ==
- Dapaqin
- Chinese music
- List of Chinese musical instruments
