= Liujiaoxian =

The liujiaoxian (Chinese: 六角弦) is a traditional Chinese bowed string instrument in the huqin family. The liujiao (六角) in its name literally means "six corners," and hence liujiaoxian is constructed with a hexagonal body. It is used primarily in Taiwan.

== See also ==
- Chinese music
- List of Chinese musical instruments
- Huqin
