= Tiqin =

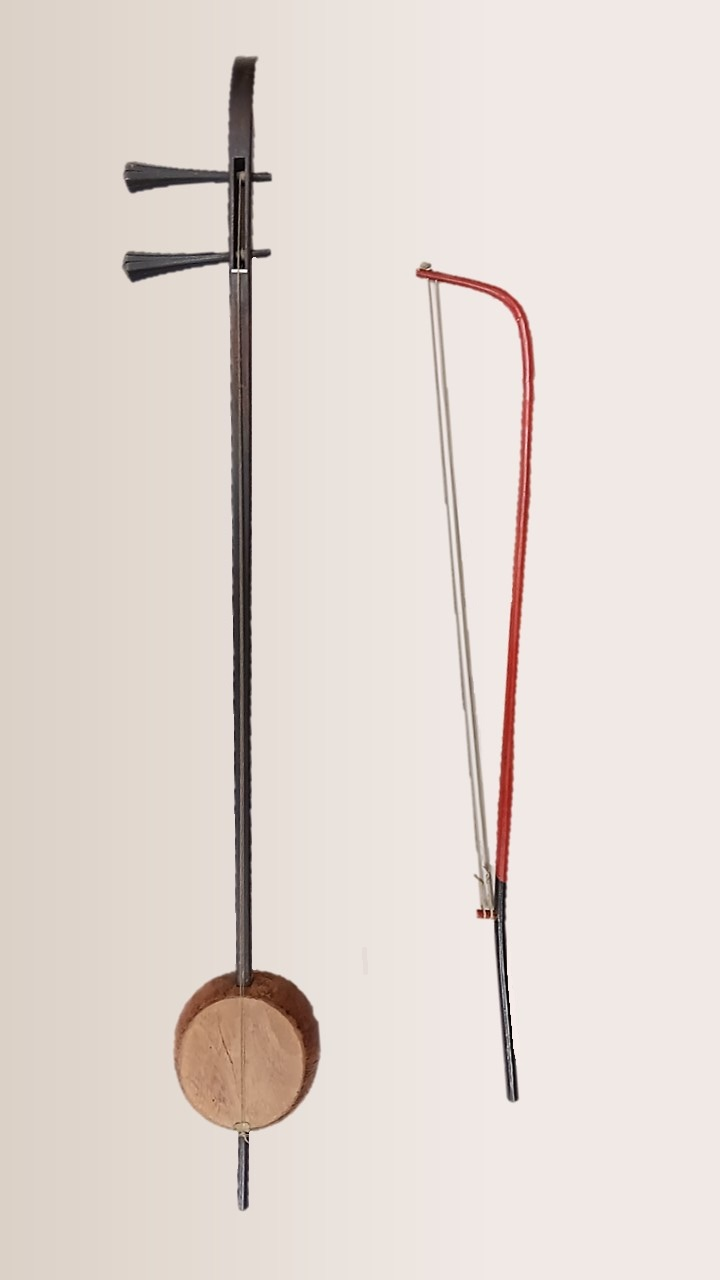
- Tiqin in the Metropolitan Museum of Art
- Classification: Bowed string instrument

Related instruments
- Erhu; Huqin

The tiqin (Chinese: 提琴; pinyin: tíqín) is a name applied to several two-stringed Chinese bowed string musical instruments in the huqin family of instruments.

== Types ==
There are several types of tiqin:

- The tiqin used for kunqu opera
- The tiqin used for Cantonese music
- The tiqin used in Fujian and Taiwan
- An antiquated name for the sihu

== Overview ==
The tiqin used in Cantonese music, also known as the zhutiqin (竹提琴) is a member of the "hard bow" (硬弓) ensemble in Cantonese opera. Its neck is made of hardwood, often suanzhi (酸枝; "rosewood") or zitan (紫檀, red sandalwood). The zhutiqin's sound chamber is made of a very large section of bamboo (larger than that of the erxian, another bowed string instrument used in Cantonese music). Instead of snakeskin, the face is made of a piece of tong wood (桐, Firmiana simplex) or palm wood (like the face of a yehu). The back of the sound chamber is made of the natural joint in bamboo, with sound holes cut in it. The tiqin used today in Cantonese opera is tuned to 仜-士/Mi-La/E-A (the opposite of the erxian, which is tuned A-E.)

The name also occasionally referred to what is now called the sihu.

Additionally, the term tiqin is used in Chinese as a generic term referring to Western bowed string instruments of the violin family:

- Xiao tiqin (小提琴) = violin
- Zhong tiqin (中提琴) = viola
- Da tiqin (大提琴) = cello
- Diyin tiqin (低音提琴) = double bass

== See also ==
- Huqin
- Erhu
- Chinese music
- List of Chinese musical instruments
