= Tiexianzai =

The tiexianzai (鐵弦仔), also known as the guchuixian (鼓吹弦), is a bowed string instrument in the huqin family originating in China. It is a two-stringed fiddle with a characteristic metal amplifying horn at the end of its neck.

According to some sources, it was invented by the Fulao people.

== See also ==
- Chinese music
- List of Chinese musical instruments
- Huqin
