= Leiqin =

- Classification: Bowed string instrument

Related instruments
- Zhuihu (China)

The leiqin (雷琴 or 擂琴, literally "thunderous instrument"; also called leihu) is a Chinese bowed string musical instrument.

== Construction ==
Made of brass and wood, the leiqin is covered with snakeskin and has a long fretless fingerboard. The two strings pass over a small bridge that is placed on the snakeskin, near the top edge. A mobile unit called a shankou holds the strings in place.

== Playing technique ==
The leiqin is played while the player is seated in a chair, with the instrument's body resting in his or her lap and held in a vertical or near-vertical position. Unlike the erhu and other instruments in the huqin family, the strings are touched against the fingerboard in the same technique as the sanxian. Players use a leg rest, typically made of solid wood with a smooth, flat bottom. Leg rests especially aid beginners who may not have exact control over their playing pressure.

== History ==
Wang Dianyu, a traditional folk musician from Shandong, created the leiqin in the late 1920s. It was adapted from an earlier traditional instrument called zhuihu.

== See also ==
- Zhuihu
- Huqin
- Kokyū
- Music of China
- Traditional Chinese musical instruments
- String instruments
