= Ulla (instrument) =

Korean traditional gong instrument

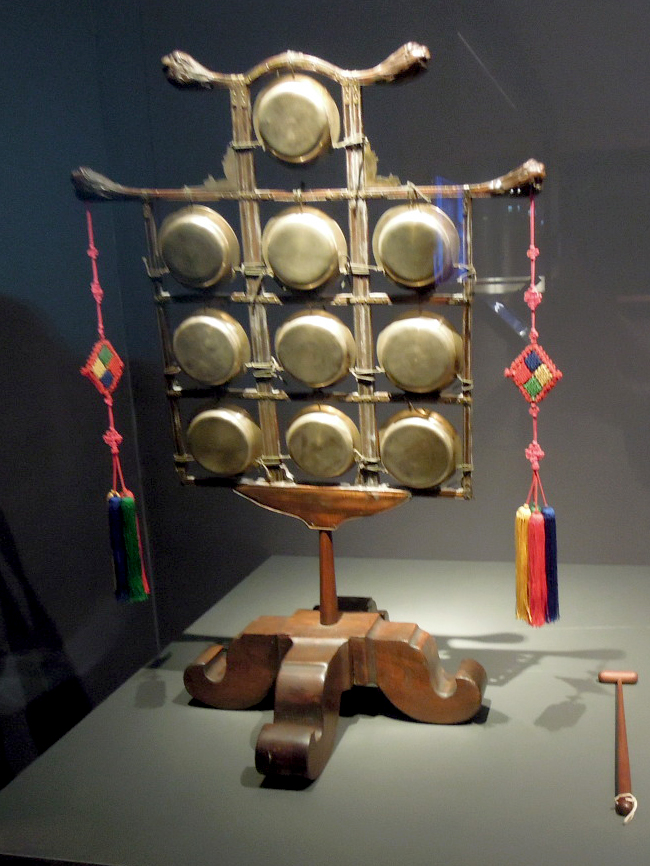
Ancient ulla.

The ulla (Korean: 운라; Hanja: 雲鑼; 雲羅) is a traditional Korean percussion instrument comprising a set of ten small tuned gongs in a wooden frame. They are struck with a mallet. Each of the gongs are the same size, but they produce different sounds due to their differing thickness.

It is also called guunra (구운라; 九雲鑼) or uno (운오; 雲璈). The instrument is attested to during the Joseon period.

The ulla is derived from the Chinese yunluo.
