= Zhuihu =

Chinese two-stringed bowed string instrument

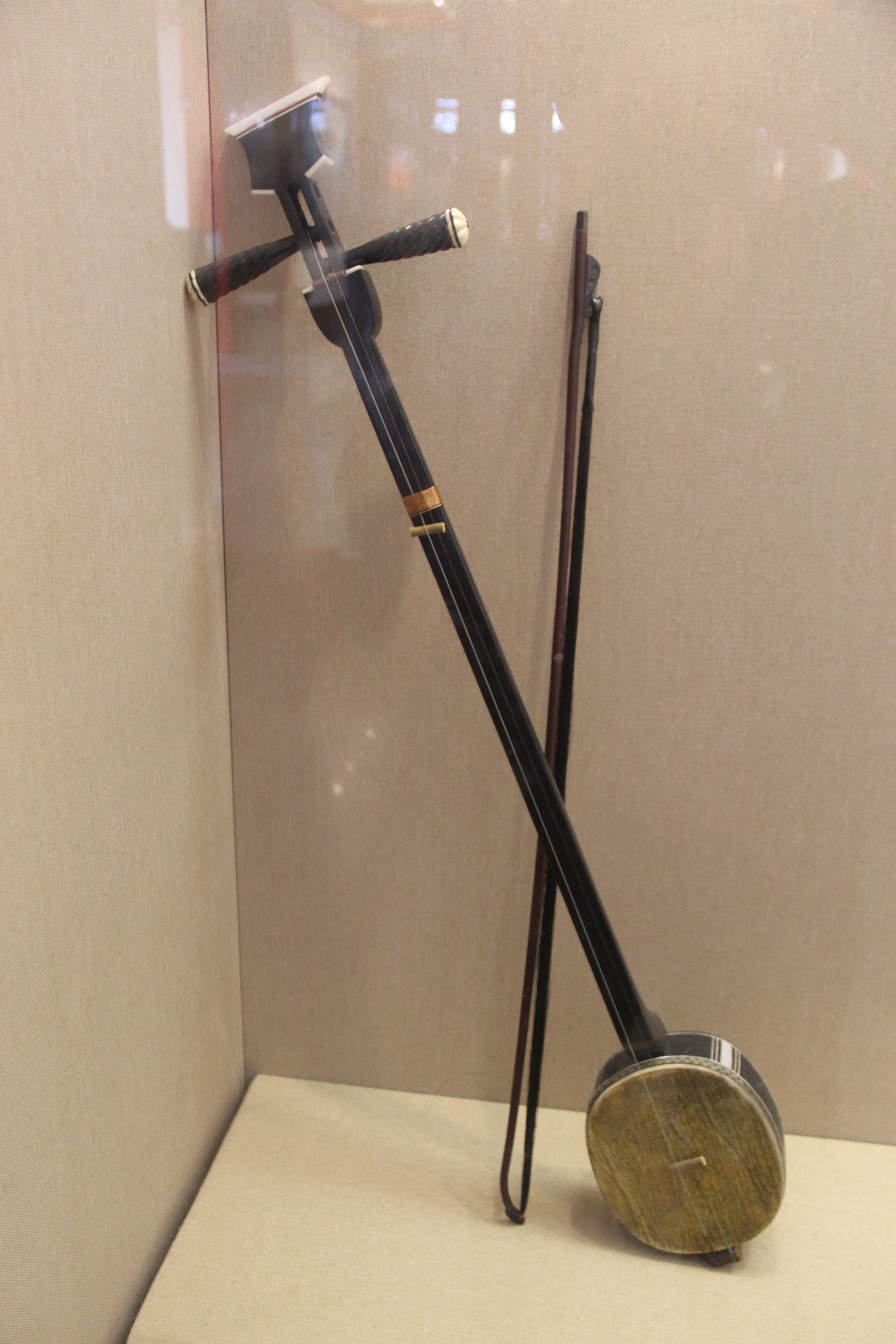

String instrument
- Classification: String instrument
- Hornbostel–Sachs classification: 3 (chordophone)
- Developed: China

Related instruments
- Sanxian

The zhuihu (坠胡; pinyin: zhùihú; Yale romanization: jwèi-hú) is also called zhuiqin (坠琴; pinyin: zhùiqín; Yale romanization: jwèi-chín), zhuizixian (坠子弦; pinyin: zhùzixián; Yale romanization: jwèi-dz-syán), erxian (二弦; pinyin: èrxián; Yale romanization: èr-syán), or quhu (曲胡; pinyin: qǔhú; Yale romanization: chyǔ-hú). It is a two-stringed bowed string instrument from China. In construction, it resembles the sanxian, and likely evolved as a bowed version of that musical instrument. Unlike bowed string instruments in the huqin family (such as the erhu), the zhuihu has a fretless fingerboard against which the strings are pressed while playing.

The zhuihu is used to accompany a form of traditional narrative singing referred to as zhuizi, which originated in the Henan province of China. A more modern version of the zhuihu called the leiqin was developed in China in the 20th century. Another related instrument is the Japanese kokyū.
