= Galgo =

Traditional Korean drum

- Hangul: 갈고; 양장고; 양고
- Hanja: 羯鼓; 兩杖鼓; 兩鼓
- Lit.: Galgo: deerskin drum; Yangjanggo: two-stick drum
- RR: galgo; yangjanggo; yanggo
- MR: kalgo; yangjanggo; yanggo

The galgo (Korean: 갈고; alternatively yangjang-go or yang-go) is a traditional Korean drum. The drum has an hourglass-shaped wooden body and two drum heads of identical diameter, similar to the janggu. Compared to the janggu, the galgo is fitted with a sound-adjusting funnel that is different. The galgo uses thinner drum skins and is struck with two bamboo sticks, chae; the mallet shaped gungchae is not used. The pitch of the drum can be controlled on both sides of the drum rather than only one pitch per-side for the janggu.

The Chinese jiegu, adopted from the Central Asian region of Kucha during the Tang dynasty, is the model from which the galgo is derived. The Japanese kakko, which is used in gagaku music, is also derived from the jiegu.

This instrument was popular after the rule of King Yeongjo in the Joseon dynasty. It is often mentioned in the Jinyeoneuigwe (historical records of the palace). However, the galgo has fallen out of use by traditional music performers. Until 2015, if one wished to see this instrument, normally it will be in The National Center for Korean Traditional Performing Arts, but it can also be seen as part of the Traditional Band of the Republic of Korea Army when it performs in military tattoos, since a modern example has been recently manufactured in the traditional manner for the band.

== See also ==
- Korean music
- Traditional Korean musical instruments
