= Huluqin =

The huluqin (葫芦琴) is a plucked string instrument. It is a four-stringed lute with a gourd body and is used by the Naxi people and Zhuang people of Yunnan. Sometimes, huluqin play with instruments of Tibetan dodar music from Labrang Monastery, Gansu

In history, huluqin is a plucked string instrument from unique frescoes to Mogao caves of Dunhuang, which is not recorded in history books. The huluqin painted in the mural has two forms-four-string and five-string (sometimes there are types that use 6 strings). The prototype of the giant huluqin comes from Cave 262 (Sui) five-string huluqin. Under the creative transformation of the designers and producers of Shanghai No. 1 National Musical Instrument Factory, the huluqin is decorated with African red sandalwood and boxwood outlines the phoenix platform. It makes the huluqin not only noble and domineering, but also simple and simple. On the huluqin panel are painted two flying heavens flying above the Dunhuang frescoes, smiling with flowers, and colorful falling stars. This state of mind is quite contagious, as if "fluttering like a legacy of independence, evolving and ascending to immortality". The structure of the huluqin is the same as that of the pipa and can be played with the pipa technique.

The giant huluqin is 4.36 meters high, 1.6 meters wide, and 0.5 meters thick, making it the 13th member of the giant family of Shanghai No.1 National Musical Instrument Factory.

== See also ==
- Chinese music
- List of Chinese musical instruments
- Huqin
