= Dapaqin =

The dapaqin (大琶琴) is a modern bowed string instrument originating in China. It is the bass variant of the paqin. Its name literally means "big paqin". Its tone is similar to that double bass.

== See also ==
- Paqin
- Chinese music
- List of Chinese musical instruments
