= Niutuiqin =

The niutuiqin (Chinese: 牛腿琴; pinyin: niútuǐqín), or niubatui (Chinese: 牛巴腿; pinyin: niúbātuǐ), is a traditional Chinese bowed string instrument. It is a two-stringed fiddle and is used by the Dong people of Guizhou.

== See also ==
- Chinese music
- List of Chinese musical instruments
- Huqin
