= Khushtar =

Stringed instrument from the Uyghur Region, China

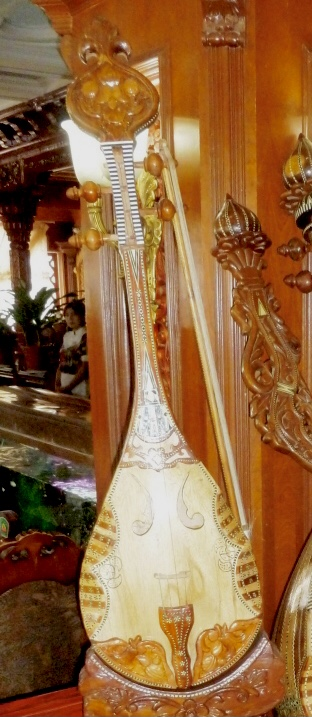
- Khushtar

String instrument
- Classification: Bowed String instrument
- Hornbostel–Sachs classification: (Composite chordophone)

Related instruments
- Violin, Kemenche, Ghijek

The khushtar (Chinese: 胡西它尔; Uyghur: خۇشتار, Хуштар, also hushtar or hustar) is a bowed lute from the Uyghur Region, Western China. It has four strings in four courses and is tuned G, D, A, E.

Sometimes the Khushtar also has sympathetic strings. It is most common among the Uyghur peoples in the Xinjiang province of Western China, especially Urumqi.

== Construction ==
The Khushtar has a body made of staves like a lute or oud. These staves are usually made of mulberry or apricot wood. The soundboard is usually made of pine. The instrument will often have a carving of a bird on the top of the head scroll. The pegs are often made of walnut wood.

== Playing technique ==
The instrument is played upright on the knee, with the curved attachment on the end of the body resting on the knee itself.

== See also ==
- Setar
- Tembor
