= Erxian =

Chinese bowed string instrument

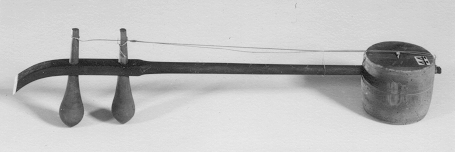
- Erxian,19th century, at the Metropolitan Museum of Art

Related instruments
- Bowed string instrument; Huqin (China)

The erxian (Chinese: 二弦; pinyin: èrxián; Jyutping: ji6 jin4; lit. 'two string') is a Chinese bowed string instrument in the huqin family of instruments. It has two strings and is used primarily in Cantonese music, most often in "hard string" chamber ensembles. In the 1920s, following the development of the gaohu, the erxian experienced a decline and since the late 20th century has been little used outside the tradition of Cantonese opera.

Similar instruments also referred to as erxian (constructed and played differently from the Cantonese erxian discussed above) are used in Chaozhou music (where it is called touxian, 头弦, Teochow: tao5 hin5, literally "leading string [instrument]") and in the nanguan music of the Southern Fujian people.

The erxian (called 二弦; yi6 yin4 in Cantonese) is often referred to as the yizai (二仔) amongst older Cantonese opera musicians. The neck of most erxian is made of hardwood (often suanzhi (酸枝; "rosewood") or zitan (紫檀; "rosewood or red sandalwood"). The sound chamber is made of a large section of bamboo with a dome-shaped ring of hardwood glued on the front end, making the actual playable face of the chamber about half the size of the entire face. The back of the sound chamber is not covered with any lattice work like those of erhu or gaohu. erxian can be found with very ornate dragon heads, ruyi (如意) heads, or a very plain box-cut stock head. Earlier erxian very closely resembled the jinghu of Beijing opera in size, construction, and playing technique.

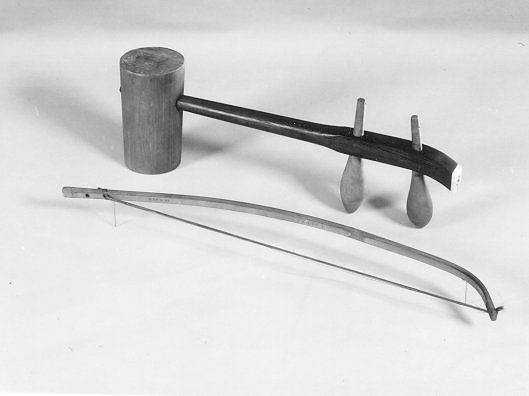
Erxian 19th century Chinese, possibly Chaozhu sub-culture, from the Metropolitan Museum of Art

Currently, the erxian is used for accompanying the singing of dai-hau (大喉) characters in Cantonese opera as well as all roles in gu-hong Cantonese opera (古腔粵劇). Other instruments used in conjunction with the erxian are the juktaikam/zhutiqin (竹提琴), yueqin (yuetkam), sanxian (samyin), and doontong /duantong (短筒). Together, this grouping of instruments is called the "hard bow ensemble" (硬弓). The name "hard bow" comes from the fact that both the erxian and tiqin are/should be played with a bow made of a thick, hard piece of bamboo rather than a thinner and softer reed like modern huqin bows.

The erxian of earlier times came in two forms: one for playing bongjee / bangzi (梆子) , and a slightly larger one for playing yiwong /erhuang (二黃) .

- A bangzi erxian is tuned to 士-工/la-mi/A-e
- An erhuang erxian is tuned to 合-尺/so-re/G-d

Today, the bangzi erxian is more commonly used to play both bangzi and erhuang melodies. The heavy silk strings of the earlier erxian have largely been replaced with wound steel strings and some modern players have begun to use erhu bows instead of the heavier (and more uncomfortable) "hard bows."

While the erxian has experienced a decline in usage since the 1920s, it remains a staple instrument in any Cantonese opera orchestra and recently composed Cantonese operas like "新霸王別姬" and "林沖之魂會山神廟" are calling for its regular usage.

== See also ==
- Huqin
- Đàn nhị
- Gaohu
- Tiqin
- Traditional Chinese musical instruments
