= Yaogu =

Traditional Chinese drum

The yaogu (Chinese: 腰鼓; literally "waist drum"), sometimes historically referred to as the hugu (Chinese: 胡鼓; literally "barbarian drum" ) or xiyugu (Chinese: 西域鼓; literally "drum from the Western Regions" ), is a medium-sized, traditional Chinese drum. It is the symbol of Chinese drums. It is used as part of a number of traditional customs and celebrations, including Chinese New Year and Lantern Festival.

The drum is played at the musician's waist, being struck with the hands or with wooden sticks.

== History ==
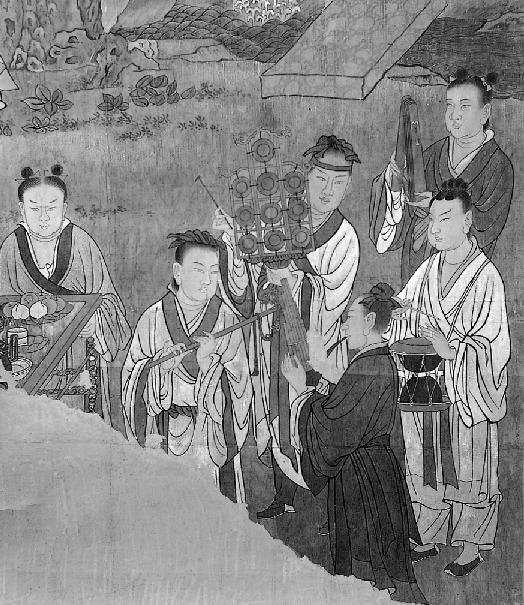
A Yaogu player (far right, mid-ground) depicted in a Daoist musical ensemble.

According to the "Shanhaijing", the drum is the product of the Yellow Emperor and Chi You battle, and later developed into indispensable equipment to boost morale and deter enemies. For the convenience of carrying, people imitate the shape of the drum, made to tie the waist of the snare drum.

As early as the Qin and Han dynasties, the drums were regarded as indispensable equipment by the garrison generals as well as swords, guns and bows and arrows. In case of enemy raids, they would beat the drums to send a message; when two armies fought against each other, they would beat the drums to cheer them on; and when they won a battle, the soldiers would beat the drums to celebrate. By the Song dynasty, the Yangge and Yaogu were very prosperous and developed into a folk entertainment activity.

As time passed, the drums gradually developed from military use into a folkloric dance for local people to pray to the gods, wish for a good harvest, and celebrate the Spring Festival, thus making the drums more popular, but the style and performance of drumming continued to retain the vigorous and heroic posture of certain Qin and Han generals.

In 1942, after the publication of Chairman Mao Zedong's "Speech at the Yan'an Literary and Art Symposium", a new Yangge movement emerged in Yan'an and the Shaan-Gan-Ning border area. The development of revolutionary literature and art injected life into the ancient art form of Yaogu. At that time, the literary workers of Lu Yi transformed the costumes of Yaogu, ending the ancient warrior style and making profound changes in the performance form and artistry of Yaogu. The "white sheep belly handkerchief and red belt" became the costume feature of the drum performers, and has been used until now.

In recent years, it has been performed at the opening ceremony of the 11th Asian Games, the Hong Kong Handover Celebration and other large-scale events, and has also been performed in Japan. The drum performance can be performed by several people or thousands of people, and its majestic momentum and exquisite expression are intoxicating, and it is known as the "World's First Drum".

== Construction ==
Yaogu have been described by texts as being a type of hourglass drum, as can be seen in historical images like the one above, but others, indeed many modern instruments, are instead tall and narrow with a slightly widened middle.

Yaogu is the same shape as the Huagu and slightly larger, and is said to have been developed from the Huagu.

The drums are made of wood and covered with cowhide or mule skin at both ends. Drum body painted red or black lacquer. Some of them depict ornaments. Two drum rings are installed on one side of the drum body, and the ring is tied with a belt to hang the drum diagonally from the waist, and each hand holds a whip to strike. The large drum is 40 cm long and has a diameter of 20 cm; the small drum is 34 cm long and has a diameter of 15 cm.

== As part of Traditional Dance ==
Yaogu performances are energetic affairs; performers move their bodies with the beats of drums and musical rhythm to express particular passions. Performers shake their heads and wave their shoulders strongly, combining dance moves with their own personal experiences.

=== As soloist ===
Yaogu players have also taken the role of a "soloist" in the Western classical tradition, standing in front of an orchestra.

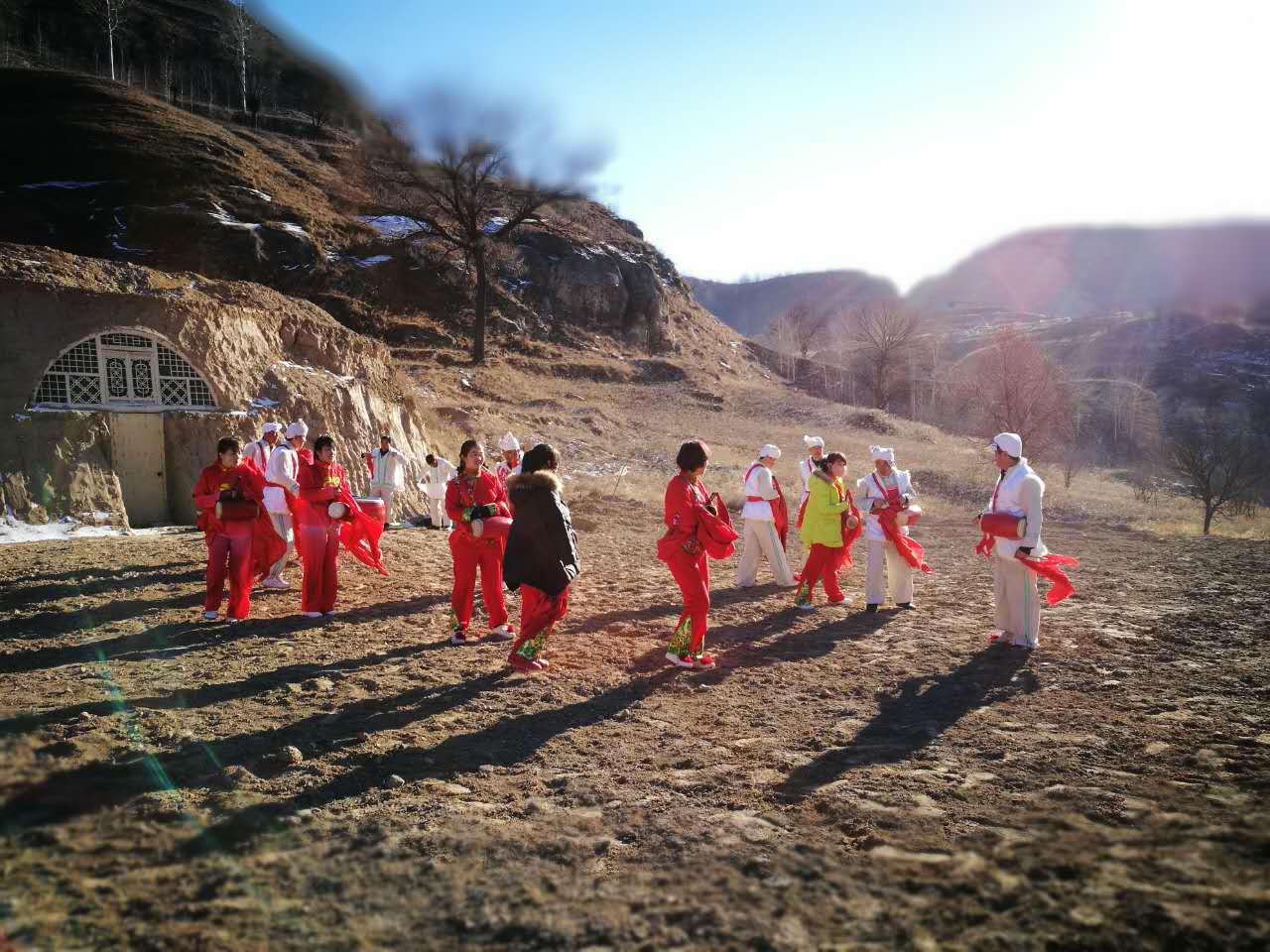
Waist drums in Ansai, Shaanxi, China

== Culture ==
The Yaogu is thought to originate from the Western Regions of China.

The Yaogu has been associated with the simple and unconstrained character of the farmers in the northwest loess plateau, expressing the collective spirit of the Shaanxi people, and wishes for a good life.

== Performance Format ==
The performance of the Yaogu is more free and flexible. The number of performers can be small or large, from a few or a dozen to hundreds or thousands of people. As the number of performers is not limited, the performance form is also more flexible. Generally speaking, there are two types of Yaogu performances, one is venue Yaogu and the other is road Yaogu.

=== Venue Yaogu ===
Venue Yaogu refers to performance activities that take place in fixed places such as stages and squares. The number of people performing on the stage is usually around a hundred, while the number of people performing in the square can be around a thousand. Venue performances are rich in content and diverse in form, with one person playing alone, two people playing against each other, and multiple people playing. Road drums are also called "marching drums" and "crossing street drums", which are performed by performers in the process of marching, mainly in line, mainly used in folk activities, such as New Year's Day in the countryside in the first month to create a festive atmosphere.

=== Mountain Yaogu ===
In recent years, for the purpose of participating in large scale film and television shooting activities, the Yaogu are generally brought to the mountain beams of the Loess Plateau to perform. Hundreds of Yaogu performers perform on the loess mountain beams, which is a magnificent and artistic effect with dusty soil, thus forming the mountain Yaogu.

== Accompanying instruments ==
Ansai waist drum accompaniment mainly consists of two kinds of percussion and blowing music. Percussion music has one or more pieces each of big drum, big flange and small sickle. Big drum sound quality is thick, strong in volume, penetrating, and the main accompaniment instrument. Small shackles belong to the auxiliary instruments, and enhance the musical effect, so that the rhythm is more bright and harmonious. Blowing music is mainly composed of Penna.
