= Yunluo =

Traditional Chinese musical instrument

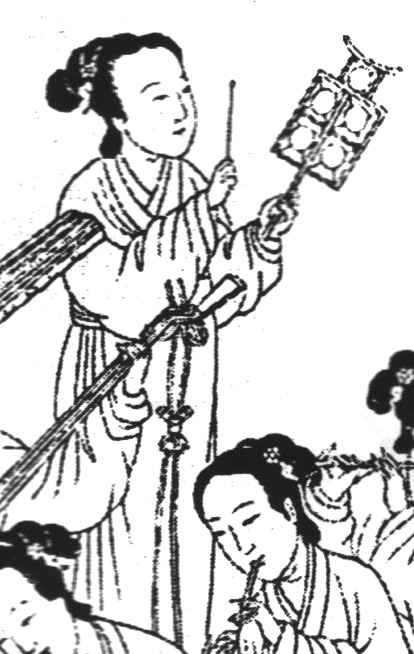
Female performer with five-gong yunluo, from Chinese engraving

The yunluo (simplified Chinese: 云锣; traditional Chinese: 雲鑼; pinyin: yúnluó [y̌nlu̯ɔ̌]; literally "cloud gongs" or "cloud of gongs"), is a traditional Chinese musical instrument. It is made up of a set of gongs of varying sizes held within a frame. It was also called yún'áo (雲璈) in ancient times.

== Traditional yunluo ==
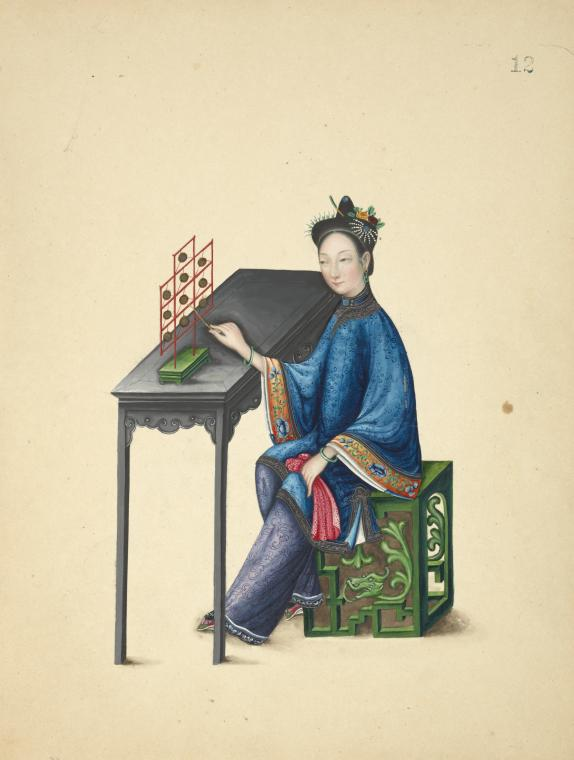
Woman playing Shímiàn luó (十面锣; 十面鑼), from Chinese watercolours in the 1800s (Qing Dynasty)

The yunluo is a set of usually ten small tuned gongs mounted in a wooden frame, with each gong being about 9-12 cm in diameter, and the height of the frame being about 52 cm. The yunluo's gongs are generally of equal diameter but different thicknesses; the thicker gongs produce a higher pitch. It is often used in wind and percussion ensembles in northern China. Old drawings also depict a smaller yunluo with just five gongs, which was held by a handle by one hand and played with the other.

The traditional yunluo is sometimes referred to as the shímiànluó (十面锣; 'ten faced gongs') to distinguish it from the modern redesigned yunluo.

== Modernized yunluo ==
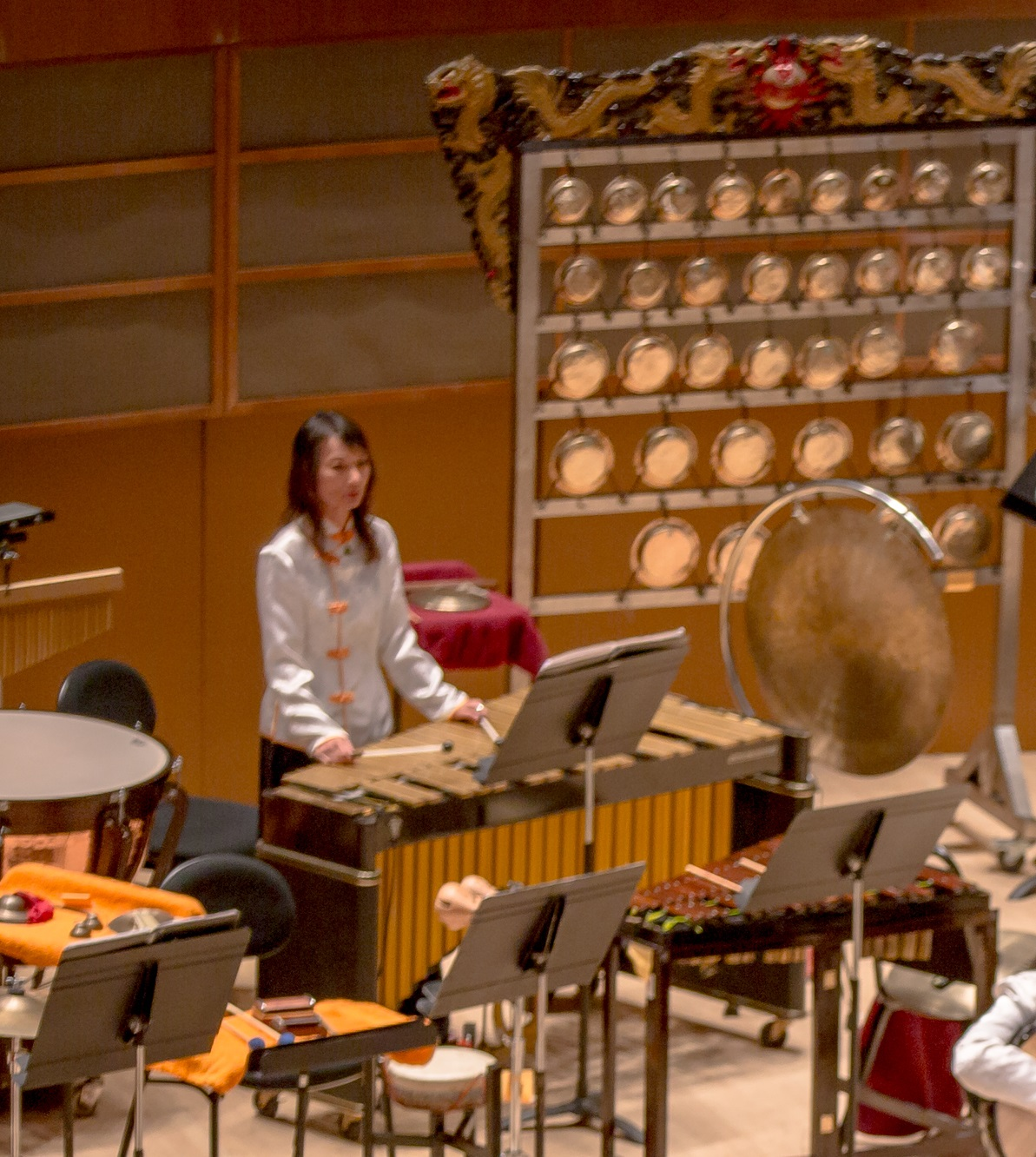
yunluo (on right) as used in a modern Chinese orchestra

A modernized yunluo has been developed from the traditional yunluo for use in the large modern Chinese orchestra. It is much larger with 29 or more gongs of different diameters. Its height may be over 2m including its two legs on which it stands on the floor (the frame itself is about half its height); its width is about 1.4 m or wider.

== In other countries ==
A very similar instrument called the ulla (Korean: 운라; Hanja: 雲鑼 or 雲羅), which is derived from the yunluo, is used in the music of Korea. The ulla was introduced from the Qing Dynasty in the late Joseon Dynasty is presumed to have been used in haengak (행악; 行樂; royal court music played in procession). Like the yunluo it consists of ten small, round, flat brass gongs suspended in a wooden frame, and played with a small wooden mallet.

The nhã nhạc music of Vietnam uses a similar instrument with three gongs, called the tam âm la (三音鑼).

== See also ==
- Traditional Chinese musical instruments
- Music of China
