= Kakko (instrument) =

Japanese double-headed drum

The kakko (羯鼓/鞨鼓) is a Japanese double-headed drum. Kakko drums are usually laid sideways on stands, and are played on both drumheads with sticks known as bachi. Kakko drums have been used in taiko ensembles, but are also used in the gagaku form of older Japanese court music.

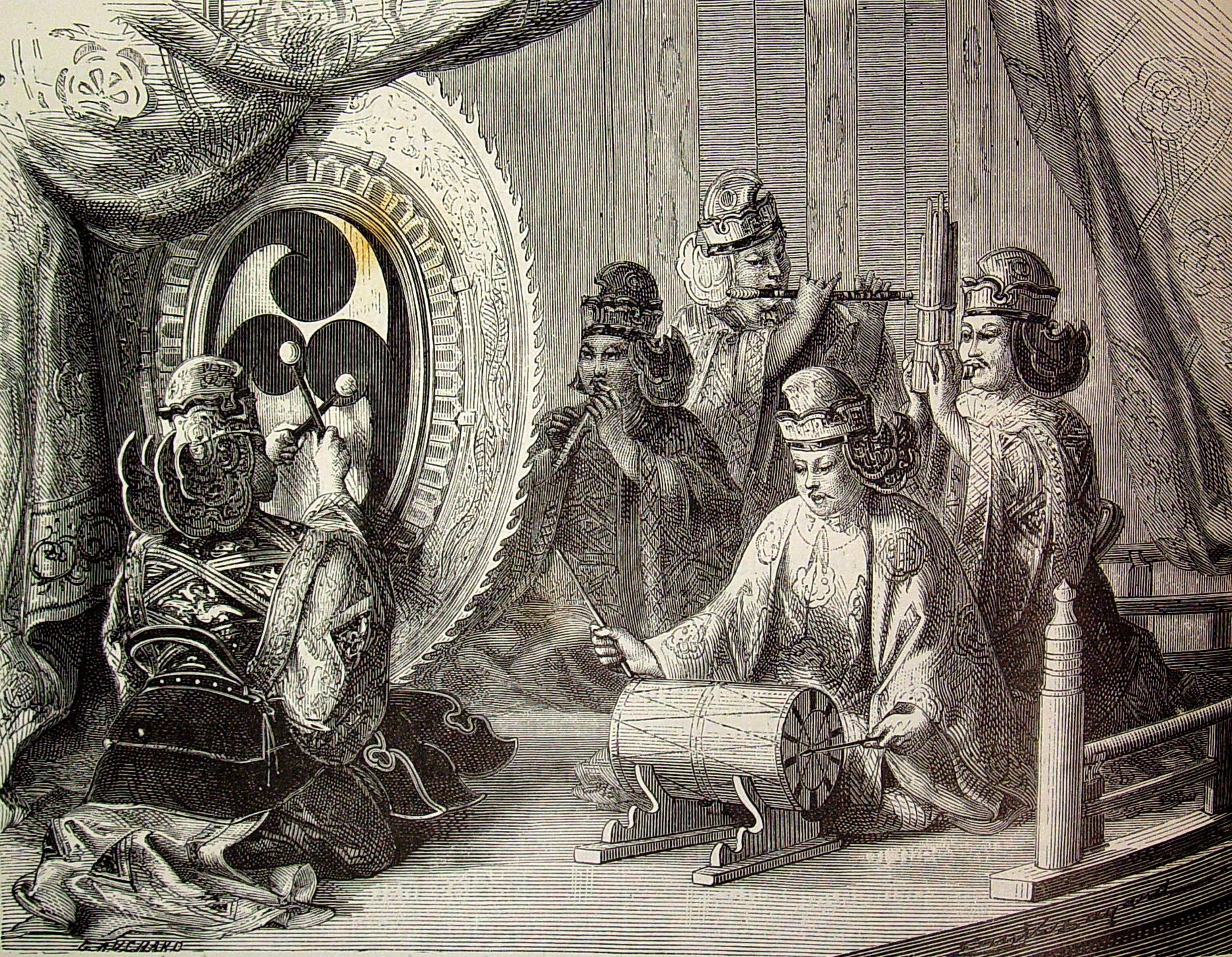
Historical depiction of a kakko (right)

== History ==
The kakko is derived from the Chinese jiegu, a drum popular in China during the Tang dynasty; the Korean galgo is also derived from this drum.

== Construction ==
One way in which the kakko differs from the regular taiko drum is in the way in which it is made taut. Like the shime-daiko and tsuzumi, the skin of the heads are first stretched over metal hoops before they are placed on the body, tying them to each other and tightening them making them taut.

== See also ==
- Jiegu
- Galgo
