= Tanggu (drum) =

Traditional Chinese drum

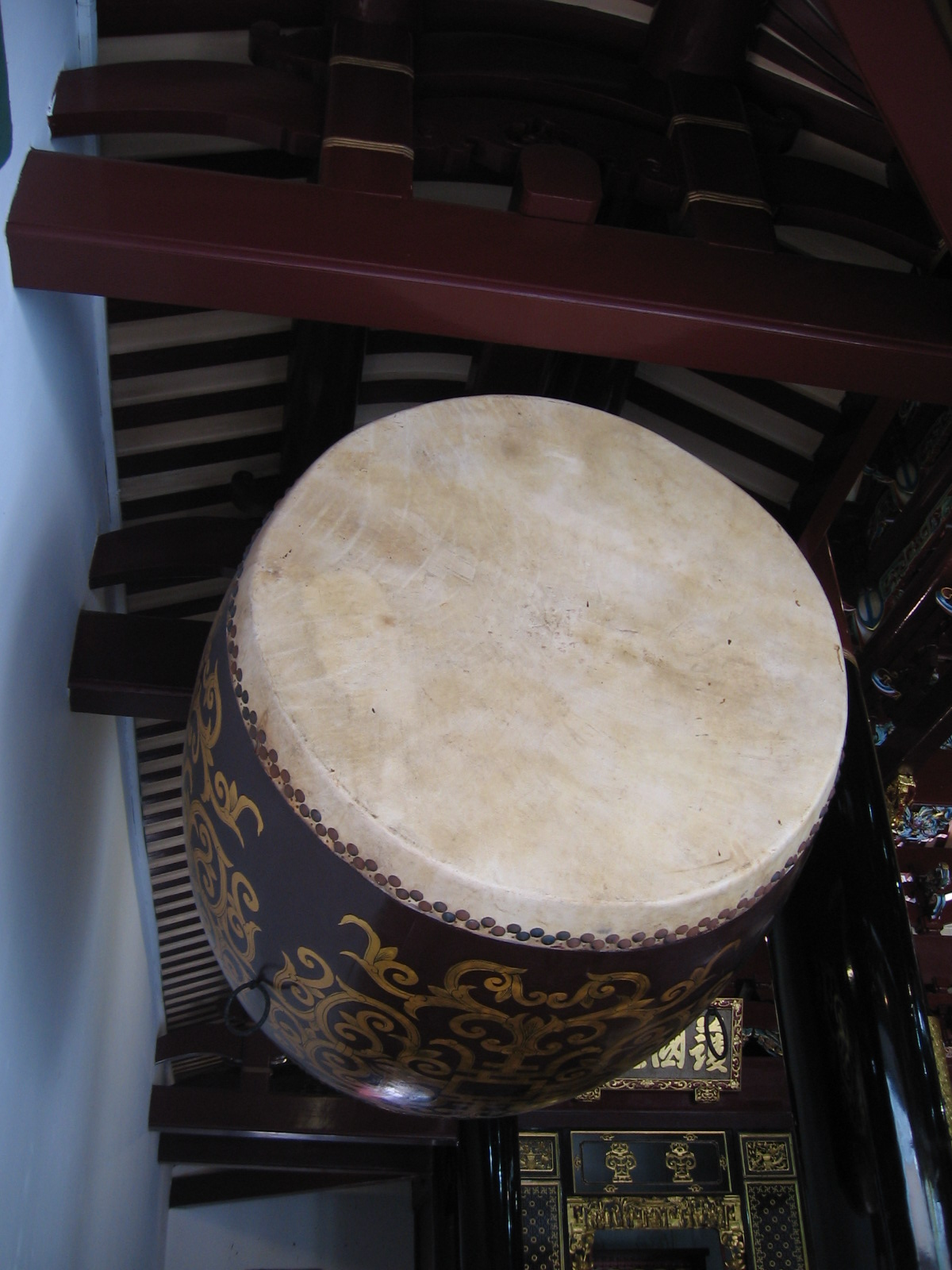
Tanggu drum

The tanggu (堂鼓; pinyin: tánggǔ, pronounced [tʰɑ̌ŋkù]; literally "ceremonial hall drum"; sometimes spelled tang gu) is a traditional Chinese drum that dates back to the Northern Wei Dynasty. It is medium in size and barrel-shaped, with two heads made of animal skin, and is played with two sticks.

The tanggu is usually suspended by four rings in a wooden stand. Two wooden sticks are used to strike the upward facing membrane.

The Tanggu (Drum) is known as "Tonggu". During the Qing Dynasty, it was called "Zhanggu". Its skin is normally made of buffalo's hide. The pitch and tone of the sound produced are not definite. It depends on the strength and which part of the drum skin is being hit.

There are two types of Tanggu: the Xiao Tanggu and the Da Tanggu. The only difference is that the Xiao Tanggu is smaller in size, and thus produces a higher pitch sound.

Orchestral works which use the Tanggu includes Fisherman's Song of the East China Sea and The General's Commands.

== See also ==
- Traditional Chinese musical instruments
