= Jiegu =

Ancient Chinese drum

This is a part of Dunhuang fresco, showing instruments including jiegu drum.

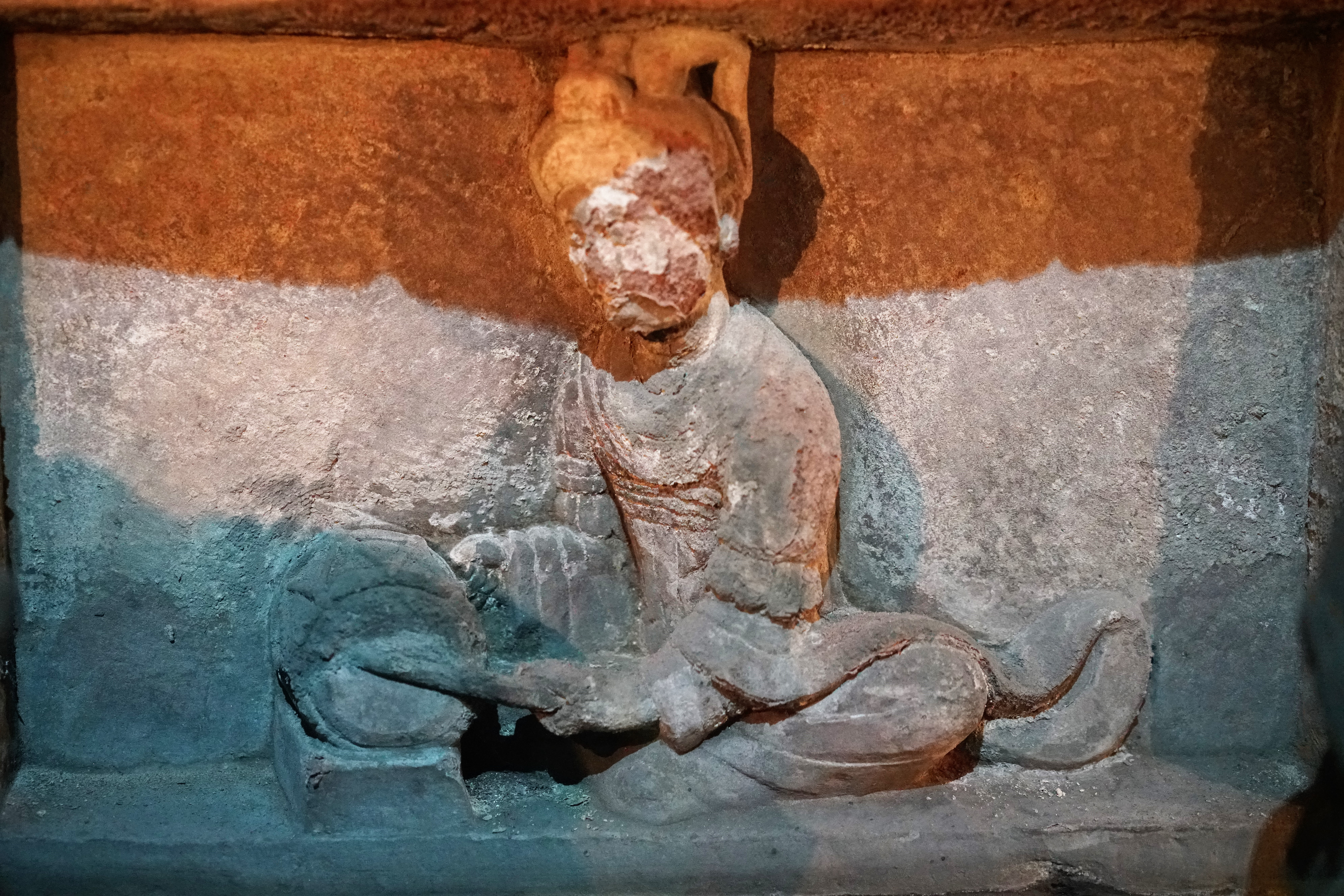
Sculpture in the tomb of Wang Jian, showing woman playing jiegu drums.

The jiegu (羯鼓; Wade–Giles: chieh^{2}-ku^{3}; pinyin: jiégǔ; sometimes translated as "wether drum"; also written as 鞨鼓) was a drum used in ancient China. It was cylindrical, laid on stands, and played with two wooden sticks. As for the structure, the leather on both sides is thin and the size is the same, and it is played with sticks in both hands.

== History ==
The jiegu was adopted from the Central Asian region of Kucha during the Tang dynasty, and became a popular instrument for dancing, particularly among nobles. Emperor Xuanzong of Tang (reigned 712–756) was known as a skilled player of the instrument. A Korean instrument derived from the jiegu called the galgo is still occasionally used in Korea. In Japan, the kakko is also derived from the jiegu, and is still used in gagaku music. The Korean galgo is almost the same size and shape as the Janggu, but the Japanese one is smaller and played on a pedestal.

== See also ==
- Galgo
- List of traditional Chinese musical instruments
