= Bo (instrument) =

Type of cymbals originating in China

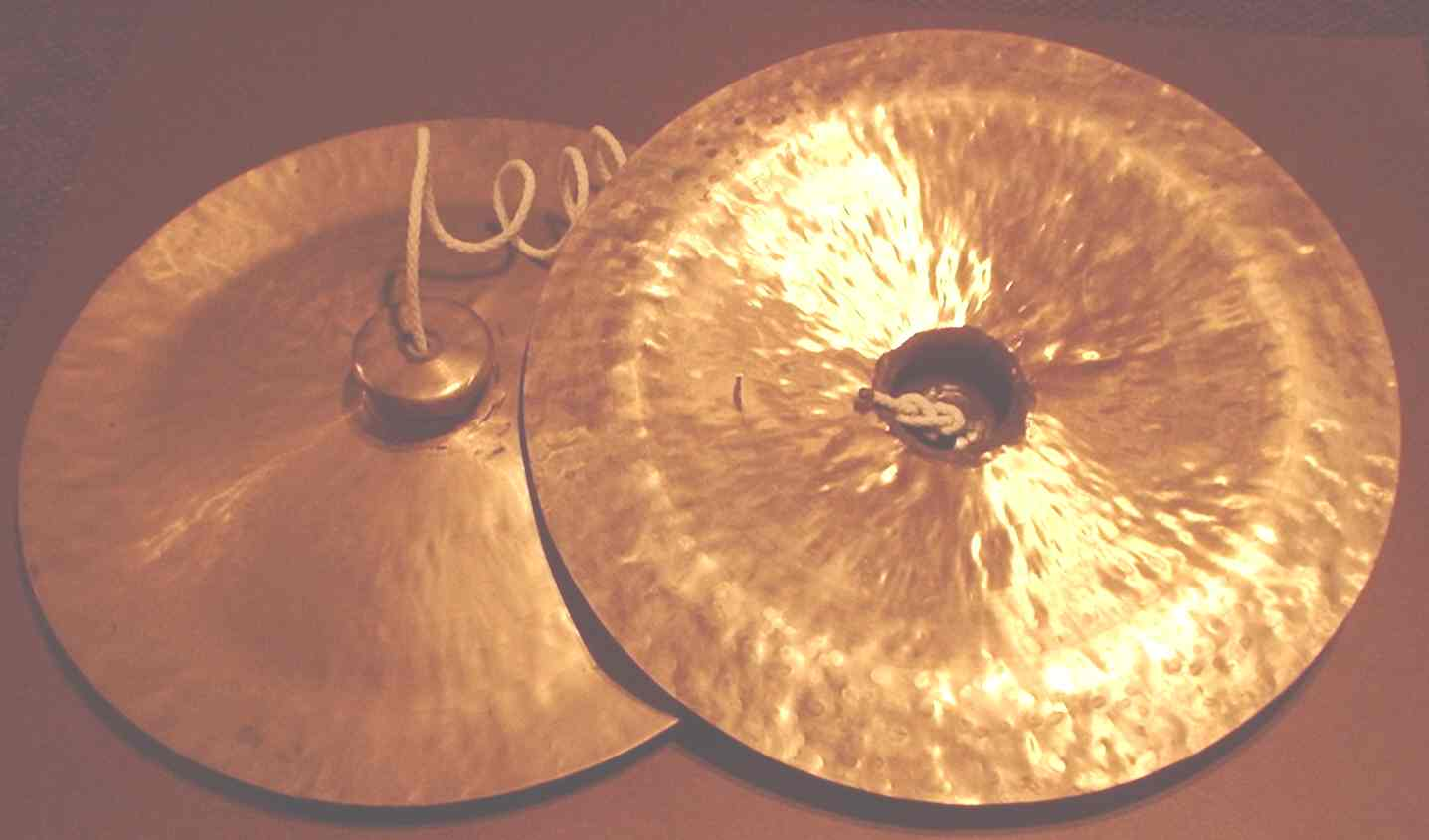
Bo

The bo (simplified Chinese: 钹; traditional Chinese: 鈸; pinyin: bó; Wade–Giles: po) is a percussion instrument originating in China, a type of cymbal. It consists of two plates that are clashed together. It is a concussion idiophone.

The Metropolitan Museum of Art has one from nineteenth century China. Both parts have a diameter of 56.5 centimeters.

China cymbals used by rock and jazz drummers are similar to the bo, but are mounted on stands and played with drumsticks. Bo are usually realized in bronze. In the Sichuan opera they are used to emphasize the movements of actors.

Xiaobo is a variant of cymbals whose diameter ranges from 12 cm to 14 cm. Other variants are zhongbo (medium cymbals), shuibo (water cymbals) and dabo (large cymbals).
