= Flower drum =

Chinese hand drum

Percussion instrument
- Other names: Huagu
- Classification: Percussion
- Hornbostel–Sachs classification: classification needed
- Developed: Antiquity

A flower drum (Chinese: 花鼓; pinyin: Huāgǔ) is a type of double-skinned Chinese hand drum. The huagu is normally painted red on the sides and generally smaller than the usual tanggu, which makes it easier to use. Usually a red colored sling strap is used by the performer. It is beaten with wooden sticks like other Chinese drums.

== Impact on non-Chinese popular culture ==
The instrument appears in the plot of the 2002 rewrite of the Rodgers and Hammerstein musical Flower Drum Song, but not in the 1958 original, which took its name from the bestselling 1957 novel The Flower Drum Song on which the musical was very loosely based; see Paigu.
