= List of musical instruments =

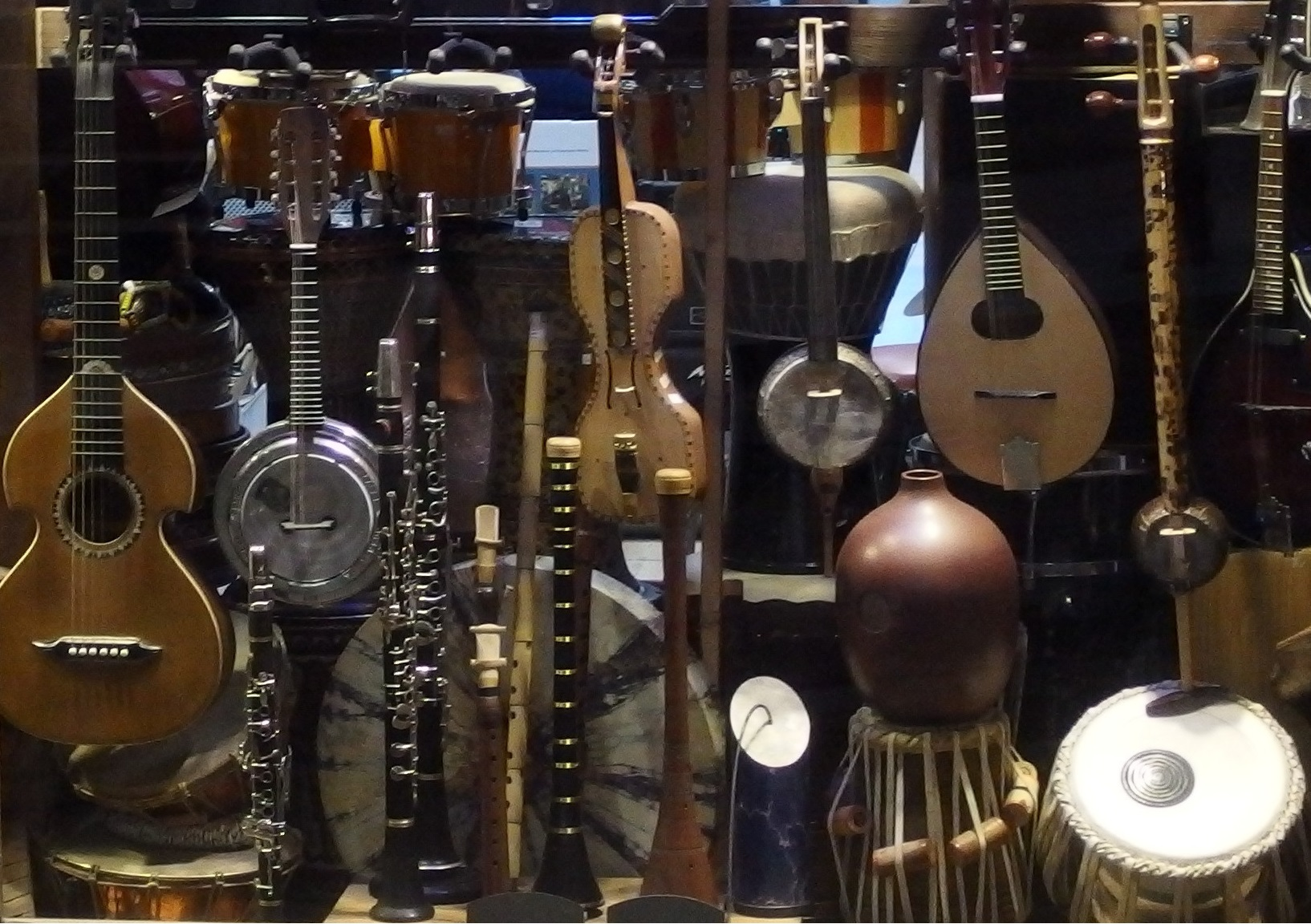
An assortment of musical instruments in an Istanbul music store

== Percussion instruments ==
=== Idiophones ===
Instrument	Picture	Classification	H-S Number	Origin	Common classification	Relation
Acme siren		aerophones	112.122	England. Developed and patented in 1895. Acme is the trade name of J Hudson & Co of Birmingham, England. It was sometimes known as "the cyclist's road clearer"	unpitched percussion	whistle
Afoxé		idiophones	112.122	Edo (Nigeria), Brazil. Afro Brazilian musical instrument.	unpitched percussion	bell
Agogô		idiophones	111.242	Yorubaland	unpitched percussion	bell
Agung		idiophones	111.241.2	Indonesia; Malaysia; Philippines	unpitched percussion	slit drum
Agung a tamlang		idiophones	111.24	Philippines Maguindanao	unpitched percussion	slit drum
Ahoko		idiophones	112.13	West Africa	percussion	
Angklung		idiophones	111.232	Indonesia	pitched percussion	
Anvil: Peening Anvils; Turdus philomelos anvil		idiophones		Anvil is an unconventional musical instrument	unpitched percussion	anvil
Apito		aerophones	421.221.11	Brazil, Also known as samba whistle	unpitched percussion	whistle
Array mbira		idiophones	122.1			
Axatse		idiophones	454.456	Ghana	Unpitched	
Babendil		idiophones	111.242.1	Philippines	unpitched percussion	
Bak		idiophones	111.12	Korea		
Bamboo slit drum		idiophones	111.24	Africa; Asia	unpitched percussion	slit drum
Balafon		idiophones	111.212	Africa	pitched percussion	keyboard
Batá drum		idiophones	211.242.12	Cuba; Nigeria; Yorubaland		
Bell		idiophones	111.242	China	percussion	bell
Bell tree		idiophones	111.242.221		percussion	
Bianzhong		idiophones	111.242	China	percussion	
Binzasara		idiophones	112.1	Japan	percussion	
Bo		idiophones		China	percussion	cymbal
Boatswain's call		aerophones		Traditional to navies	unpitched percussion	whistle
Bonang		idiophones	111.241.21	Indonesia	percussion	Gong
Bones		idiophones	111.11		percussion	
Boomwhacker		idiophones		United States	Pitched	Plastic percussion tubes
Bu		idiophones		Korea	percussion	Clay
Bugchu		idiophones		Punjab	percussion	
Bungkaka		idiophones	111.231	Philippines	percussion	
Cabasa		idiophones	112.122	Africa	percussion	
Cajón		idiophones	111.2	Peru	unpitched percussion	box drum
Cajón de rumba		idiophones	111.24	Cuba	Unpitched	
Cajón de tapeo		idiophones	111.2	Mexico	percussion	
Calung		idiophones	111.232	indonesia	percussion	
Carillon		idiophones	111.242.2	Low Countries	pitched percussion	bell
Castanets (Palillos)		idiophones	111.141	Spain	unpitched percussion	
Catá		idiophones	111.231	Cuba	percussion	
Caxirola		idiophones	111.141	Brazil	unpitched percussion	
Caxixi		idiophones	111.141	West Africa; Brazil	percussion	
Chácaras		idiophones		Canary Islands	unpitched percussion	
Chajchas		idiophones	112.1	Central Andes	percussion	
Chengila		idiophones	111.242	Indian	percussion	
Chime bar		idiophones	111.221		percussion	
Chocalho		idiophones	112.112	Brazil	percussion	
Chimes		idiophones	412.132		pitched percussion	bell
Chimta		idiophones	111.21	South Asia	percussion	
Ching		idiophones	111.142	Cambodia; Thailand	percussion	cymbals
Chuk		idiophones		Korea	percussion	
Clapper		idiophones	111.1		percussion	
Clapstick		idiophones		Australia	unpitched percussion	clave sticks
Clash cymbals		idiophones	111.142		unpitched	cymbals
Claves		idiophones	111.11	Cuba	unpitched percussion	clave sticks
Cowbell		idiophones	111.242	Switzerland	unpitched percussion	bell
Cristal Baschet		idiophones	421.31.12	France	percussion	
Crotales		idiophones	111.22		pitched percussion	cymbal
Cymbal		idiophones	111.142	Romania	unpitched percussion	bell
Cymbals		idiophones		United States	unpitched percussion	bells
Đàn môi		idiophones		Vietnam	percussion	lamellophone
Darkhuang		idiophones		India	percussion	Gong
Daxophone		idiophones	132.1	Germany	Pitched	
Dong Son drum		idiophones		Vietnam	percussion	Bronze drums
Drum kit		idiophones and membranophones	1/2	North American	percussion	drum
Egg shaker		idiophoness	112.13		percussion	
Ekwe		idiophoness	111.22	Nigeria	unpitched percussion	silt drum
Elathalam		idiophoness	111.141	Kerala	unpitched percussion	
Eo		idiophoness		Korea	percussion	
Erikundi		idiophones	111.141	Latin America	unpitched percussion	maracas
Ferrinho		idiophones	111.1	Cape Verde	unpitched percussion	
Flapamba		idiophones	111.212	United States	percussion	
Flexatone		idiophones	112.12		pitched percussion	
Fou		idiophones		China	percussion	
Gabbang		idiophones	111.212	Philippine	percussion	xylophone
Gambang		idiophones	111.212	Indonesia	percussion	
Gandingan		idiophones	111.241	Philippines	percussion	
Gangsa		idiophones	111.222	Indonesia	percussion	Metallophone
Ganzá		idiophones	112	Brazil	percussion	
Garamut		idiophones	311.212	Papua New Guinea	percussion	
Gendèr		idiophones	111.222	Indonesia	percussion	
Genggong		idiophones	111.21	Indonesia	percussion	
Ghatam		idiophones	111.24	India	unpitched percussion	
Ghungroo		idiophones	112.1	India	unpitched percussion	
Glockenspiel		idiophones	111.212	France; Germany	pitched percussion	keyboard
Gogona		idiophones	121.22	India	percussion	
Gong		idiophones	111.241.1		percussion	
Gong ageng		idiophones	111.241	Indonesia	percussion	
Gonguê		idiophones	111.242	Brazil	percussion	
Guacharaca		idiophones		Colombia	percussion	
Guayo		idiophones	112.23	Cuban	percussion	
Güira		idiophones	112.23	Dominican Republic	percussion	
Güiro		idiophones	112.23	Cuba; Panama	unpitched percussion	
Handbells		idiophones	111.242.222	England; North America	pitched percussion	
Handchime		idiophones	111.231		percussion	
Handpan		idiophones	111.24	Swiss	pitched percussion	steelpan
Hang		idiophones	111.24	Swiss	pitched percussion	handpan
Hi-hat		idiophones	111.142		percussion	
Hosho		idiophones	112.13	Zimbabwe	percussion	
Hyōshigi		idiophones	111.11	Japan	percussion	
Ikembe		idiophones	122.1	Africa	percussion	Lamellophone
Ikoro		idiophones	111.24	Nigeria	percussion	
Jam block		idiophones	111.2		percussion	
Jew's harp		idiophones	121.22	Asia		
Jing		idiophones	111.242	Korea	percussion	gong
Jingle bell		idiophones	111.242		percussion	
Kagul		idiophones	112.23	Philippines	percussion	
Kagura suzu		idiophones	211.11	Japan	percussion	
Kalatalo		idiophones	111.1	Ukraine	percussion	
Kalimba		idiophones	122.1	Zimbabwe	pitched percussion	Mbira
Kane		idiophones		Japan	percussion	
Karinding		idiophones		Indonesia	percussion	
Kashaka		idiophones	112.1	West Africa	percussion	
Kayamb (Kayamba)		idiophones	112.13	Africa	percussion	
Kecer		idiophones	111.142	Indonesia	percussion	
Kei		idiophones		Japan	percussion	gong
Kemanak		idiophones		Indonesia	unpitched percussion	
Kempul		idiophones	111.241	Indonesia	percussion	
Kenong		idiophones	111.241.2	Indonesia	percussion	
Kepyak		idiophones	111	Indonesia	percussion	
Khartal		idiophones	111.141	Mauritius; Réunion		cymbals
Khong wong lek		idiophones		Thailand	percussion	
Khong wong yai		idiophones		Thailand	percussion	
Kkwaenggwari		idiophones		Korea	percussion	
Klaxon		aerophones	412.132	United States	noise-makers	air horn
K'lông pút		idiophones		Vietnam	percussion	Xylophone
Kong nyee		idiophones		Cambodia	percussion	gong
Kong toch		idiophones	111.241	Cambodia	percussion	gong
Kong von thom		idiophones		Cambodia	percussion	
Kouxian		idiophones	121.2	China	percussion	
Krakeb		idiophones			percussion	
Kulintang		idiophones	111.241	Philippines	percussion	Xylophone
Kulintang a kayo		idiophones		Philippines	percussion	xylophone
Kulintang a tiniok		idiophones		Philippines		metallophone
Lagguti		idiophones	111.2		percussion	
Lali		idiophones	1	Fiji	percussion	
Lokole		idiophones	111.212	Africa	percussion	
Lujon		idiophone	111.222	United States	percussion	metallophone
Manjur		idiophone		Eastern Arabia	percussion	
Maraca		idiophones	112.1	Venezuela	unpitched percussion	
Marching machine		idiophones			percussion	
Marimba		idiophones	111.212	Africa, Guatemala, Mexico, Honduras, Nicaragua, & Costa Rica	pitched percussion	Xylophone
Marimbaphone		idiophones		United States	pitched percussion	Xylophone
Mark tree		idiophones	111.232	United States	Unpitched	
Mayohuacán		idiophones	111.231	Cuba	percussion	
Mbira		idiophones	122.1	Africa; Equatorial Guinea; Zimbabwe	pitched percussion	keyboard
Metallophone		idiophones	111.212	Asia	pitched percussion	xylophone
Mihbaj		idiophones	1		percussion	
Mechanical music box		idiophones	111		pitched percussion	music box
Mukkuri		idiophones	121.22		percussion	lamellophone
Nail violin		idiophones	131.2		Sets of friction sticks	
Noisemaker		idiophones and aerophones		Noisemaker is a musical instrument which is not used for music, but rather for noisemaking	unpitched percussion	musical instrument
Octa-Vibraphone		idiophones		United States	percussion	keyboard
Pahū Pounamu		idiophones		New Zealand; Traditional Maori Gong		tam-tam
Paiban		idiophones	111.11	China	percussion	
Pate		idiophones	1	Polynesia; Melanesia	percussion	
Pattala		idiophones	111.211	Burma	percussion	
Pat kon		idiophones		Burma	percussion	
Phách		idiophones	111.12	Vietnam	percussion	
Pixiphone		idiophones	111.212	England	percussion	
Pong lang		idiophones	111.212	Thailand	percussion	
Qairaq (Kairak)		idiophones	111.1; 112.1	Afghanistan; Tajikistan; Uzbekistan	percussion	castanets
Quadrangularis Reversum		idiophones	111.212	United States	percussion	xylophone
Rainstick		aerophones	112.13	Mexico	noise makers	whip
Rakatak		idiophones	234.345	Ghana	percussion	
Ranat ek		idiophones		Thailand	percussion	
Ranat ek lek		idiophones		Thailand	percussion	
Ranat thum		idiophones	314.121.2	Thailand	percussion	xylophone
Ranat thum lek		idiophones	314.11	Thailand	percussion	xylophone
Ratchet		idiophones	111.222	Also known as Cog Rattle	noise-makers	ratchet
Reyong		idiophones	111.241	Indonesia	percussion	
Sandpaper blocks		idiophones			unpitched percussion	
Sapp		idiophones		Punjab	percussion	
Saron		idiophones	111.222	Indonesia		
Scabellum		idiophones		Greece; Rome	percussion	
Semantron		idiophones	111.1		percussion	
Shekere		idiophones	112.122	Yorubaland; West Africab	percussion	
Shōko		idiophones	111.122	Japan	percussion	
Singing Bowl		idiophones		Himalayas	pitched percussion	
Sistrum		idiophones	111.12		percussion	
Skrabalai		idiophones	111.242.222	Lithuania	percussion	
Slenthem		idiophones	111.222	Indonesia	Pitched	
Slit drum		idiophones	111.24			slit drum
Song bells		idiophones	111.242.2		percussion	metallophone
Song loan		idiophones		Vietnam	percussion	
Sounding stone		idiophones		China	percussion	
Steelpan		idiophones	111.24	Trinidad & Tobago	pitched percussion	drum
Steel tongue drum		idiophones	111.24	India, which is not a true slit drum but rather a steelpan	pitched percussion	drum
Stomp box		idiophones	111	United States	percussion	
Taal		idiophones	111.142	India	percussion	cymbals
Talempong		idiophones	111.242	Indonesia	percussion	
Tam-tam		idiophones	111.241.11	Traditional to Orchestra	unpitched percussion	gong
Tambourine		idiophones	211.311	Middle East; Rome; Greece	unpitched percussion	frame drum
Tambourine de Bearn		idiophones	314.122	Iberian Peninsula	pitched percussion	string drum
Taxi horn		aerophones	412.132		noise makers	air horn
Temple blocks		idiophones	111.24	East Asia		slit drum
Teponaztli		idiophones	111.24	El Salvador; Guatemala; Mexico		slit drum
Thattai		idiophones	111.1	India		
Thongophone		idiophones	111.21		percussion	
Thunder sheet		idiophones	111.221	Canada	percussion	
Tingsha		idiophones	111.142	Tibet		
Trash Tube		idiophones		United States	unpitched percussion	Güiro
Triangle		idiophones	111.211	Cajuns	unpitched percussion	triangle
Triccaballacca		idiophones		Italy	unpitched percussion	
Trīdeksnis		idiophones	112.112		percussion	
Tubaphone		idiophones	111.232		percussion	
Turkish crescent		idiophones	111.242.222		percussion	
Txalaparta		idiophones	111.222	Basque	unpitched percussion	
Udu		idiophones		Nigeria	percussion	
Ulla		idiophones		korea	percussion	Gong
Vibraphone		idiophones	111.222		pitched percussion	Xylophone
Vibraslap		idiophones	112.12	United States		
Washboard		idiophones		United States	unpitched percussion	Cajuns
Whamola		chordohones	311.122	United States. Similar to percussion versions of Bladder fiddle	pitched percussion	string drum
Whip		aerophones	411		noise makers	whip
Whistle: Pea whistle; Steam whistle; Train whistle		aerophones	421.221.11		fipple flutes	whistle
Wind chime		idiophones	×	The Wind chime is a musical instrument that is played by the Wind	unpitched percussion	chimes
Wind machine		idiophones	13		percussion	
Wobble board		idiophones	121.2	Australia	percussion	
Wood block		idiophones	111.24		unpitched percussion	drum
Wooden fish		idiophones	111.24	China		
Wood scraper block		idiophones			percussion	
Xylophone		idiophones	111.212		pitched percussion	Xylophone
Xylorimba		idiophones	111.212		pitched	
Yu		idiophones		China	percussion	
Zatula		idiophones	112.2	Ukraine	unpitched	
Zhu		idiophones		China	percussion	
Zill		idiophones	111.142	Asia; Saudi Arabia; Turkey	unpitched percussion	cymbals

=== Membranophones ===
Instrument	Picture	Classification	H-S Number	Origin	Common classification	Relation
Adufe		membranophones	211.311	Portugal	percussion	Frame drum
Agida		membranophones	201.212	Suriname	percussion	bass drum
Alfaia		membranophones	211.212.1	Brazil	percussion	
Apinti		membranophones	211.212	Suriname	percussion	tenor drum
Arobapá		membranophones	211.21	Cuba	percussion	drum
Ashiko		membranophones	211.251.1	Yoruba	percussion	drum
Aṣíkò		membranophones	211.261.1	Nigeria	percussion	drum
Atabaque		membranophones	211.221.1	Brazil	percussion	
Atumpan		Membranophone	211.221.1	Ghana	percussion	drum
Baboula		membranophones	211.221.1	Grenada	percussion	barrel drum
Balaban		membranophones	211.311	Montserrat	percussion	frame drum
Balsié		membranophones	2	Dominican Republic	percussion	drum
Bamboula		membranophones	211.211.2	Haiti	percussion	drum
Bangu		membranophones		Chinese	percussion	frame drum
Bara		membranophones	211.11	Burkina Faso; Ivory Coast; Mali	percussion	
Barrel drum		membranophones	211.222	Cuba	percussion	barrel drum
Barriles -buleador (large) -primo -repicador -subidor (small)		membranophones	211.221.2	Puerto Rico	percussion	barrel drum
Bass drum		membranophones	211.212		percussion	bass drum
Bedug		membranophones	211.212.1	Indonesia	percussion	
Bendir		membranophones	211.311	North Africa	percussion	
Bodhrán		membranophones	211.321	Ireland; Scotland	percussion	frame drum
Bongo drums		membranophones	211.251.2	Cuba	percussion	drum
Boobam		membranophones	211.211.1	United States	percussion	tom-tom
Bougarabou		Membranophone	211.261.2	West Africa	percussion	
Bubon		Membranophone	232.311	Ukraine	percussion	
Buhay		Membranophone		Ukraine	percussion	friction drum
Buk		Membranophone	211.222.1	Korea		
Candombe chico repique piano		membranophones	211.221.1	Uruguay	percussion	conga
Chenda (Chande); Uruttu chenda Veekku chenda Acchan chenda		membranophones	211.212	India	percussion	drum
Conga (Tumbadora)		membranophones	211.221.1	Caribbean	percussion	drum
Cuíca		membranophones	231.11	Brazil	percussion	friction drum
Culo'e puya		membranophones		Venezuela	percussion	drum
Cultrun		membranophones		Chile	percussion	drum
Dabakan		membranophones	211.261.2	Philippines	percussion	goblet drum
Daf (Dap, Def)		membranophones	211.311	Iran	percussion	frame drum
Damaru		membranophones	211.3	India; Nepal; Tibet	percussion	drum
Damau		membranophones		India	percussion	drum
Damphu drum		membranophones		Nepal	percussion	
Davul (dhol, tapan, atabal, tabl)		membranophones	211.212	Turkey; Bulgaria; Macedonia; Middle East	percussion	bass drum
Dauylpaz		membranophones			percussion	drum
Dayereh		membranophones	211.311	Iran	percussion	drum
Den-den daiko		membranophones	2	Japan	percussion	bell
Dhak		membranophones		Bangladesh; India	percussion	
Dhimay (Dhimaya, Dhime)		membranophones	211.212	Nepal	percussion	drum
Dhol		membranophones	211.212	Asia; India	percussion	bass drum
Dholak (Dholaki)		membranophones	211.222	Asia; India	percussion	barrel drum
Dhyāngro		membranophones	211.32	Nepal	percussion	Frame drum
Dimdi		membranophones	211.311	India	percussion	frame drum
Djembe		membranophones	211.261.1	West Africa	percussion	goblet drum
Doli		membranophones			percussion	drum
Dollu		membranophones	211.222.1	India	percussion	frame drum
Dunun (Dundun, Doundoun)		membranophones	211.212.1	West Africa Burkina Faso Ivory Coast Gambia Guinea Mali Senegal	percussion	drum
Fontomfrom		membranophones		Ghana	percussion	
Frame drum		membranophones	211.3		percussion	
Friction drum		membranophones			percussion	
Galgo		membranophones	211.242.1	Korea	percussion	
Gran Cassa		membranophones	211.212	Italy	percussion	bass drum
Gbedu		membranophones	1	Yorubaland	percussion	drum
Ghumot		membranophones		India	percussion	
Goblet drum		membranophones	211.26	Egypt; Turkey other Arab countries	percussion	drum
Goema		membranophones		South Africa	percussion	
Gong bass drum		membranophones			percussion	
Gudugudu		membranophones	1	Yorubaland	percussion	Timpani
Gumbe		membranophones	211.311	Jamaica; Sierra Leone	percussion	
Hand-repique		membranophones	211.211.1	Brazil	percussion	
He-drum		membranophones		Chinese	percussion	
Hira-daiko		membranophones	1	Japan	percussion	drum
Huehuetl		membranophones	211.121	Mexico	percussion	drum
Idakka		membranophones	211.242.1	Southern India	percussion	talking drum
Igba		Membranophone			percussion	
Ilimba drum		membranophones	211.11	Zimbabwe	percussion	gourd drum
Ilu		membranophones	211.212	Brazil	percussion	drum
Ingoma; Shakwe; Inyahura; Igihumurizo		membranophones	211.212	Rwanda	percussion	drum
Janggu (Janggo, changgo)		membranophones	211.242	Korea	percussion	drum
Jori		membranophones		South Asia	percussion	
Junjung		membranophones	2	Gambia; Senegal	percussion	
Kakko		membranophones	2	Japan	percussion	drum
Kanjira		membranophones	211.311	India	percussion	frame drum
Kebero		membranophones	2	Ethiopia	percussion	
Kendang (Gendang)		membranophones	211.222	Brunei; Malaysia; Philippines	percussion	drum
Khanjani		membranophones	2	West Bengal	percussion	drum
Khol (Mrdanga)		membranophones	211.232	India	percussion	drum
Klong khaek		membranophones		Thailand	percussion	
Klong yao		Membranophone		Thailand	percussion	
Kompang		membranophones	211.311	Indonesia	percussion	Frame drum
Kpanlogo		Membranophone	211.221.1	Ghana	percussion	
Krakebs		membranophones	2	Algeria; Berbers; Morocco; Saudi Arabia; Tunisia	percussion	
Kundu		membranophones	211.222.1	Papua	percussion	
Kus		Membranophone		Persia	percussion	
Lag-na		membranophones	211.32		percussion	Frame drum
Lambeg drum		membranophones	211.212	Ireland	percussion	bass drum
Lion's Roar		membranophones	232.11		percussion	
Lytavry		membranophones	211.11	Ukraine	percussion	
Madal		membranophones	211.212	India; Nepal	percussion	drum
Maddale		membranophones	211.212	India	percussion	mridangam
Madhalam		membranophones	211.212	India	percussion	mridangam
Maktoum (maktoom, katem)		membranophones	2	Afro-Arab	percussion	drum
Makuta		membranophones		Cuba	percussion	
Maram		membranophones		India	percussion	drum
Mardala		membranophones	211.222.1	India	percussion	
Mazhar		membranophones	211.311	Egypt	percussion	Frame drum
Mirwas		membranophones		Middle East	percussion	
Moko drums		membranophones	2	Alor	percussion	drum
Morsing		membranophones	111	China	percussion	Jew's harp
Mridangam		membranophones	211.212	India	percussion	drum
Nagara		membranophones	2	Asia	percussion	drum
Naqareh		membranophones	2	Middle East	percussion	drum
Ney		membranophones	2	Turkey; Persia; Syria; Middle East	woodwind	flute
Nodo		membranophones	2	korea	percussion	drum
Nogo		membranophones	2	korea	percussion	drum
North Drums		membranophones		United States	percussion	
O-daiko		membranophones	2	Japan	percussion	drum
Okedo-daiko		membranophones	2	Japan	percussion	drum
Octaban		membranophones	211.211.1	United States	percussion	boobam
Ōtsuzumi		membranophones	211.242.1	Japan	percussion	
Padayani thappu		membranophones	211.311	India	percussion	frame drum
Pahu		membranophones		Hawaii	percussion	
Pakhavaj		membranophones	211.212	India	percussion	mridangam
Panchamukha vadyam		membranophones	2	India	percussion	drum
Pandeiro		membranophones	211.311	Brazil; Portugal	percussion	frame drum
Pandero		membranophones	211.3	Dominican	percussion	frame drum
Pandero jarocho		membranophones	233.311-92	Mexico	percussion	frame drum
Parai		membranophones	211.311	India	percussion	frame drum
Qilaut		membranophones	2	North American; Nunavut	percussion	
Ravanne		membranophones		Mauritius	percussion	drum
Rebana		membranophones	211.311	Brunei; Indonesia; Malaysia	percussion	frame drum
Resheto		membranophones	232.311	Ukraine	percussion	
Repinique		Membranophone	211.212.1	Brazil	percussion	
Sabar		membranophones	2	Gambia; Senegal	percussion	drum
Sambal		membranophones	2	India	percussion	drum
Samphor		membranophones	2	Cambodia	percussion	barrel drum
Scottish tenor drum		membranophones	2	Scotland	percussion	drum
Shime-daiko		membranophones	2	Japan	percussion	drum
Skor daey		membranophones		Cambodia	percussion	drum
Skor thom		membranophones	211.22	Cambodia	percussion	drum
Skor yeam		membranophones		Cambodia	percussion	drum
Snare drum		membranophones	211.212.11		percussion	drum
Sogo		membranophones	2	Korea	percussion	drum
Surdo		membranophones	2	Brazil	percussion	bass drum
Taarija		membranophones		Moroccan	percussion	drum
Tabla		membranophones	211.12	Afghanistan; Bangladesh; India; Nepal; Pakistan; Sri Lanka	percussion	drum
Tabor		membranophones		Catalonia	percussion	
Taiko		membranophones	211.12	Japan	percussion	drum
Talking drum		membranophones	211.241.2	West Africa; Ghana; Ivory Coast; Senegal; Yorubaland	percussion	drum
Taphon		membranophones	211.222.1	Thailand		
Tamak'		membranophones	211.12	India	percussion	drum
Tamalin		membranophones	211.311	Ghana	percussion	
Tambora		membranophones	211.212.1	Dominican Republic	percussion	drum
Tambor huacana		idiophones or membranophones	1/2	Mexico	percussion	drum
Tambori		membranophones	1/2	Andorra; Catalonia; Spain	percussion	drum
Tamborim		membranophones	211.311	Brazil	percussion	drum
Tamborita calentana		membranophones	2	Mexico	percussion	drum
Tambourine		membranophones	211.311		percussion	drum
Tamborita calentana (Mexico)		membranophones	1/2	Mexico	percussion	drum
Tambou bas a dé fas		membranophones	211.212.2	Guadeloupe	percussion	bass drum
Tambou bas a yon fas		membranophones	211.221-7	Guadeloupe	percussion	bass drum
Tanggu		membranophones	211.222.11	China	percussion	drum
Tan-tan		membranophones	211.311	Brazil	percussion	drum
Taphon		membranophones	211.21	Thailand	percussion	drum
Tar		membranophones	211.311	Saudi Arabia	percussion	frame drum
Tbilat		membranophones	2	Morocco; Saudi Arabia	percussion	
Thavil		membranophones	211	India	percussion	drum
Thon and rammana		membranophones			percussion	drum
Timbal		membranophones	211.251.1	Brazil	percussion	drum
Timbales (Pailas)		membranophones	2	Cuba	percussion	drum
Timbrel		membranophones	211.311		percussion	Frame drum
Timpani (kettledrum)		membranophones	211.11-922		percussion	drum
Tinya		membranophones	2	Peru	percussion	drum
Tom-tom drum		membranophones	211.212.1		percussion	drum
Tombak		membranophones	2	Iran	percussion	drum
Trống cái		membranophones	2	Vietnam	percussion	drum
Trống chầu		membranophones	2	Vietnam	percussion	drum
Trống cơm		membranophones	2	Vietnam	percussion	drum
Tsukeshime-daiko		membranophones	2	Japan	percussion	drum
Tsuri-daiko		membranophones	2	Japan	percussion	drum
Tsuzumi		membranophones	1/2	Japan	percussion	drum
Unpitched Repique		membranophones	2	Brazil	percussion	drum
Uchiwa-daiko		membranophones	211.221	Japan	percussion	drum
Udukai		membranophones	211.2	India; Nepal	percussion	drum
Udukku		membranophones	211.2	India	percussion	drum
Urumi		membranophones		Tamil Nadu	percussion	drum
Yuka		Membranophone	2	Congo	percussion	
Zabumba		membranophones	211.212.1	Brazil	percussion	drum
Zerbaghali		membranophones	2	Afghanistan	percussion	drum
Zhangu		membranophones	211.311-7	China	percussion	drum

== Other percussion instruments ==
- Celesta
- Crystallophone
- Dance Chimes
- Glass harmonica
- Glass harp
- Glasschord
- Hydraulophone
- Jhyamta
- Khmuoh
- Kong chmol
- Lau
- Masacalla
- Monkey stick
- Plasmaphone
- Pyrophone
- Quintephone
- Sea organ
- Sênh tiền
- Shishi-odoshi (Japan)
- Silnyen
- Suikinkutsu (Japanese water zither)
- Tetzilacatl
- Toka
- Waterphone
- Yunluo

== Wind instruments (aerophones) ==
Instrument	Picture	Classification	H-S Number	Origin	Common classification	Relation
Accordina		aerophones	412.132	France	free reed	accordion
Accordion: Button accordion; Cajun accordion; Chromatic button accordion; Free bass accordion; Piano accordion; Schrammel accordion; Steirische Harmonika		aerophones	412.132	Europe	free reed	accordion
Accordola		aerophones	412.132	United States	free reed	mouth organ
Air horn		aerophones	423		Plosive?	Trumpet
Alboka		aerophones	422.2	Basque Country	free reed	clarinet
Algaita		aerophones		Niger	free reed	
Alghoza		aerophones	421.112	India	woodwinds	
Almpfeiferl		aerophones	421.221.12	Austria	woodwinds	flageolet baroque recorder
Alphorn		aerophones	423.121.22	Switzerland	woodwinds	natural trumpet
Alto horn		aerophones	423.232	Belgium	brass instruments	trumpet
Arghul		aerophones	422.2	Egypt	free reed	clarinet
Askomandoura		aerophones				
Atenteben		aerophones	422.2	Ghana	woodwinds	flute
Aulochrome		aerophones	422.212	Belgium	free reed	saxophone
Aulos		aerophones			free reed	
Aztec death whistle		aerophones	x	Mexico	aerophone	whistle
Baghèt		aerophones	4	Italy	free reed	bagpipe
Bagpipe		aerophones	422	Europe	free reed	bagpipe
Balaban		aerophones	422.111.2	Azerbaijan; Iran	free reed	oboe duduk
Bandoneón		aerophones	412.132	Latin America	free reed	accordion
Bansuri		aerophones	421.121.12	India	woodwinds	flute
Baritone horn		aerophones	423.232	Germany	brass instruments	trumpet
Baritone voice		aerophones	43		vocal registers	human voice
Bass voice		aerophones	43		vocal registers	human voice
Bassoon: Tenoroon; Semicontrabassoon; Contrabassoon/double bassoon		aerophones	422.112.2–71	Western Europe	free reed	oboe
Bawu		aerophones	412.131	China	free reed	pitch pipe
Bayan		aerophones	412.132	Russia	free reed	accordion
Bazooka		aerophones	423.121.11	Invented 1910s in USA. Name reused for WWII weapon that resembled this instrument.	brass instruments	trumpet epiphone
Bifora		aerophones	422.11	Italy (Sicily)	free reed	oboe
Binioù		aerophones		Brittany		bagpipe
Birbynė		aerophones	422.112.2	Lithuania	free reed	oboe
Blul		aerophones	421.111.12	Greece	woodwinds	end-blown flute kaval
Blown bottle See: Jug below		aerophones	423.111.1	North America	trumpets	conch
Boha		aerophones		France	bagpipe	
Bombard: Chromatic bombard		aerophones	422.112.2	France	free reed	oboe
Bousine		aerophones	4	Normandy	woodwind	bagpipe
Buccin		aerophones	423.22		brass instruments	
Buccina		aerophones	423.121.21	Italy (Ancient Rome)	brass instruments	trumpet
Bucium		aerophones		Romanian		alphorn
Bugle		aerophones	423.121.22	Europe	brass instruments	trumpet
Buki		aerophones		Georgia	brass instruments	trumpet
Bukkehorn		aerophones	421.221.42	Norway; Sweden	fipple flutes	ocarina
Bülban		aerophones	422.211.2	Azerbaijan		
Bullroarer		aerophones	41	Ancient civilizations	noise makers	sirens
Cabrette		aerophones	4	France	woodwind	bagpipe
Calliope		aerophones	421.222.3	Western Europe; North America	fipple flutes	organ
Caramusa		aerophones	4	Corsica	woodwind	bagpipe
Chabrette		aerophones	4	France	woodwind	bagpipe
Chalumeau		aerophones	422.2	France	free reed	clarinet
Cimbasso: F Cimbasso; E♭ Cimbasso; C Cimbasso; B♭ Cimbasso		aerophones	423.232	Italy	brass instruments	trombone
Ciaramedda		aerophones	4	sicily	woodwind	bagpipe
Cimpoi		aerophones		Romanian		Bagpiping
Clarinets: Piccolo clarinet in A♭ (or G); Sopranino clarinet in E♭ (or D); Soprano clarinet in B♭ (or A; also C, low G); Basset clarinet in A; Clarinette d'amour in G; Basset horn in F; Alto clarinet in E♭; Bass clarinet; Contra-alto clarinet; Contrabass clarinet; Octocontra-alto clarinet; Octocontrabass clarinet		aerophones	422.2	Germany	free reed	clarinet
Clarytone		aerophones	421.221.12	South Africa, invented in 2010	fipple flutes	tin whistle
Claviola		aerophones		Hermano; United States		
Concertina: Chemnitzer concertina		aerophones	412.132	Europe	free reed	accordion
Conch		aerophones	423.111		trumpets	conch
Contrabassoon		aerophones	422.112.2–71	Western Europe	free reed	bassoon
Contraforte		aerophones	422.112.2–71	Germany	free reed	bassoon
Cornamuse		aerophones	422.111.2	Europe	free reed	oboe
Cornet: E♭ Soprano cornet; A Soprano cornet; C Soprano cornet		aerophones	423.232	France	brass instruments	trumpet
Pocket cornet: Pocket trumpet		aerophones	423.232	Manufacture began USA in 1870s; used in Jazz and Dixieland music	brass instruments	trumpet
Cornettino		aerophones	423.212			trumpet
Cornett		aerophones	423.2	Northern Europe	natural trumpets	trumpet
Cornu		aerophones	423.121.21	Italy (Ancient Rome)	brass instruments	trumpet
Corrugaphone		aerophones	411		noise makers	whip
Countertenor		aerophones	43		vocal registers	human voice
Couesnophone		aerophones	4		free-reed	saxophone
Cromorne		aerophones	422.11	France	free reed	oboe
Crumhorn: Soprano; Alto; Tenor; Bass; Greatbass		aerophones	422.111.2	Western Europe	free reed	oboe
Danso		aerophones	421.111.12	Korea	woodwinds	end-blown flute
Death growl		aerophones	43	England	vocal techniques	human voice
Dentsivka		aerophones	421.221-12	Ukraine		
Didgeridoo		aerophones	423.121.11	Australia	natural trumpets	trumpet
Didjeribone		aerophones	423.121.11		natural trumpets	didgeridoo
Dilli kaval		aerophones	4	Turkey; Azerbaijan		flute
Diple		aerophones	422.21/22	Bosnia; Croatia; Montnegro	free reed	bagpipe
Diwas		aerophones		Philippines	woodwinds	bamboo
Dizi		aerophones	421.121.12	China	woodwinds	flute
Donali		aerophones	4	irán	woodwinds	flute
Dord		aerophones	4	Ireland	brass instruments	horn
Double bell euphonium		aerophones	423.232	United States	brass instruments	trumpet
Doulophone/cuprophone		aerophones	423.121.22	United States	brass instruments	trumpet
Dozaleh		aerophones	422.221.2	irán		
Duck call		aerophones	423		Plosive?	oboe
Duda		aerophones	4	Hungary		bagpipe
Dūdmaišis		aerophones	4	Lithuania		bagpipe
Duduk		aerophones	422.111.2	Armenia	free reed	oboe
Dulcian: Soprano dulcian; Alto dulcian; Tenor dulcian; Bass dulcian		aerophones	422.112.2	Western Europe	free reed	bassoon
Dulzaina		aerophones	422.112.2	Spain	free reed	oboe
Dung-Dkar		aerophones	423.111	Tibet	trumpets	conch
Dvoyanka		aerophones	4	Bulgaria	flute	wood
Dzhamara		aerophones	421.111.12	Greece	woodwinds	end-blown flute kaval
English horn		aerophones	422.112.-71	Western Europe	free reed	oboe
Erkencho		aerophones		Gran Chaco		
Euphonium		aerophones	423.232	Germany	brass instruments	trumpet
Ever büree		aerophones	4	Mongolia	brass instruments	
Fanfare trumpet		aerophones			brass instruments	trumpet
Fife		aerophones	421.121.12	Portugal; Switzerland	woodwinds	flute
Firebird		aerophones	423.21/22	Canada	brass instruments	trumpet slide trumpet
Fiscorn		aerophones	423.231	Spain	brass instruments	trumpet
Flabiol		aerophones	421.221.12	Aragon; Balearic Islands; Spain	fipple flutes	recorder
Flageolet		aerophones	421.221.12	France	fipple flutes	recorder
Flatt trumpet		aerophones	423.21/22	England	brass instruments	trumpet slide trumpet
Flugelhorn		aerophones	423.232	Germany	brass instruments	trumpet
Flumpet		aerophones	423.233	United States	brass instruments	trumpet
Flutina		aerophones	412.132	Europe	free reed	accordion
Flute: Alto flute; Bass flute; Contra-alto flute; Contrabass flute; Sub contra alto flute; Double contrabass flute; Hyperbass flute		aerophones		France	woodwinds	flute
Flûte d'amour		aerophones	421.121.12-71	European	woodwinds	flute
Folgerphone		aerophones	422.2	United States	free reed	clarinet
French horn		aerophones	423.232	Europe	brass instruments	trumpet
Frula		aerophones		Southeast Europe		flute
Fujara		aerophones	421.221.12	Slovakia	fipple flutes	recorder
Gaida		aerophones	422	Balkans; Southeast Europe	free reed	bagpipe
Gaita gastoreña		aerophones		Andalusia	hornpipe	
Gaita navarra		aerophones	421.12	Spain	free reed	oboe shawm
Gaita transmontana		aerophones		Portugal	free reed	bagpipe
Galandronome		aerophones		France	brass instruments	bassoon
Garmon		aerophones	412.132	Russia; Tatarstan	free reed	accordion
Gbofe		aerophones	421.111.12	Congo	brass instruments	didgeridoo natural horn
Gemshorn		aerophones	421.221.42	Germany	fipple flutes	ocarina
Gingras		aerophones		Phoenicia, and possibly Caria	Unknown	flute
Gourd mouth organ		aerophones	412.132	Asia	Free reed mouth organ	
Graïle		aerophones	422.112	France	wooden	oboe
Guan: Guanzi; Houguan		aerophones	422.111.2	China	free reed	oboe
Gudastviri		aerophones		Georgia		bagpipe
Gudi		aerophones	4	China	woodwinds	
Guide-chant		aerophones	412.13	France	free reed	harmonium
Hano		aerophones	421.111.12	Hawaii	woodwinds	nose flute
Harmoneon		aerophones	421.132	France	free reed	accordion
Harmonica: Chromatic harmonica; Diatonic harmonica; Tremolo harmonica; Orchestral harmonica; ChenGong harmonica		aerophones	412.132	Germany	free reed	harmonica
Heckel-clarina		aerophones		Germany	woodwind	
Heckelphone: Piccolo heckelphone; Terz heckelphone		aerophones	422.112.2	Germany	reed	oboe English horn
Heckelphone-clarinet		aerophones		Germany	woodwind	
Helicon		aerophones	423.232	Europe	brass instruments	tuba
Heligonka		aerophones	422	Poland		accordion
Hichiriki		aerophones	4	japan	double reed	flute
Hirtenschalmei		aerophones	422.111			
Horagai		aerophones	423.111.2	Japan	trumpets	conch
Horn		aerophones	423.111.2	The Horn is a brass instrument	brass instruments	trumpet
Hornophone		aerophones	423.111.2		horn	Vehicle horn
Hosaphone		aerophones	423.1		natural trumpets	tube trumpet
Hotchiku		aerophones	421.111.12	Japan	woodwinds	end-blown flute
Huemmelchen		aerophones		German		
Hulusi		aerophones	412.132	China	free reed	harmonica
Hun		aerophones	421.221.42	Korea	fipple flutes	ocarina
Inci		aerophones	421.221.12	Philippines	fipple flutes	tumpong
Indian harmonium		aerophones	322.11	India	reed organ	
Irish flute		aerophones	421.121.12	Ireland	woodwinds	flute
Istarski mih		aerophones		Croatia		bagpipe
Jazzophone		aerophones				sax
Jug		aerophones	423.111.1	North America	trumpets	conch
Kaba gaida		aerophones	422.112	Bulgaria		bagpipe
Kagurabue		aerophones	421.121.12	Japan	woodwinds	flute
Kalaleng		aerophones	421.111.12	Philippines	woodwinds	nose flute
Karnay		aerophones	423.121	Uzbekistan		
Kaval		aerophones	421.111.12	Balkans; Anatolia; Central Asia	woodwinds	end-blown flute
Kawala		aerophones			woodwinds	
Kazoo		aerophones	–	United States	Woodwind	Whistle
Kèn bầu		aerophones	422.112.2	Vietnam	reed	oboe suona
Keyed bugle		aerophones	423.21	England	brass instruments	trumpet
Keyed trumpet		aerophones	423.211	England	brass instruments	trumpet
Khene		aerophones	412.132	Laos	free reed	harmonica
Khloy		aerophones	421.221.12	Cambodia	fipple flutes	recorder
Khlui		aerophones	421.221.12	Thailand	fipple flutes	recorder
Kōauau		aerophones	421.1	New Zealand	flutes	
Komabue		aerophones	421.121.12	Japan	woodwinds	flute
Kombu		aerophones		India	woodwinds	
Koncovka		aerophones	421.221.12	Slovakia	fipple flutes	recorder
Kortholt		aerophones	421	Europe	capped reed	crumhorn
Koudi		aerophones	421.121.12	China	woodwinds	flute
Kuhlohorn		aerophones	423.232	Germany	brass instruments	trumpet
Kuisi		aerophones	423.1	Colombian	cane	flute
Kuzhal		aerophones		India	free reed	
Lalitsa		aerophones		Green	woodwinds	flute
Lapa		aerophones		China	brass instruments	
Launeddas		aerophones	422.2	Italy; Sardinia	free reed	clarinet
Lituus		aerophones	423.1	Europe	natural trumpets	trumpet
Livenka		aerophones	412.132	Russia	free reed	accordion
Loophonium		aerophones	4	British	brass instrument	euphonium
Lur		aerophones	423.121.22	Denmark; Norway	natural trumpets	trumpet
Lusheng or Qeej		aerophones	412.132	China	free reed	harmonica
Mahuri		aerophones	421.122	India	wind instrument	
Marktsackpfeife		aerophones	4	East Germany		bagpipe
Martinshorn		aerophones	412.132	Germany	free reed	harmonica accordion
Mangtong		aerophones	412.132	China	free reed	harmonica accordion
Matófono		aerophones		Río de la Plata		
Mellophone		aerophones	423.232	Europe	brass instruments	trumpet
Melodica		aerophones	412.132	Italy; Germany	free reed	reed organ
Melodeon		aerophones	412.132	United States	free reed	reed organ
Mélophone		aerophones		France	free reed	
Mijwiz		aerophones	422.2	Saudi Arabia	free reed	clarinet
Mizmar		aerophones	422.112.2	Algeria; Saudi Arabia; Tunisia	free reed	oboe
Mizwad		aerophones		Saudi Arabia	free reed	bagpipe
Moo box		aerophones			noise-makers	whistle
Muchosa		aerophones		Belgium		bagpipe
Müsa		aerophones		Belgium		bagpipe
Musette de cour		aerophones	422	France	reed	bagpipe
Nabal		aerophones				
Nadaswaram		aerophones	422.112.2	South India	reed	oboe shehnai
Nafir		aerophones	423.121	North Africa	brass	
Nagak		aerophones	423.111	Korea	trumpets	conch
Nai		aerophones	4	Romania	pan flute	bamboo or reed
Native American flute		aerophones	421.23	US		
Natural trumpet		aerophones	423.121	Denmark; Norway	brass instruments	
Ncas		aerophones	423.232	Hmong people (China)	lip lute	conch
Ney		aerophones	421.111.12	Iran	woodwinds	end-blown flute
Nguru		aerophones	421.111.12	New Zealand	woodwinds	nose flute
Nohkan		aerophones	421.121.12	Iran	woodwinds	flute
Nose flute		aerophones	421.111.12	Polynesia; Africa; East Asia	woodwinds	nose flute
Nplooj		aerophones	421.111.12	Hmong people (China)	woodwinds	leaf
Nulophone		aerophones	421.111.12	Khyber Pakhtunkhwa (Pakistan)	woodwinds	flute
Oboes: Bass/Baritone oboe; Contrabass oboe; Cor anglais/English horn; Oboe d'amore; Oboe da caccia; Piccolo oboe/Oboe musette		aerophones	422.112-71	Western Europe	reed instruments	oboe
Ocarina: Transverse ocarina; Pendant ocarina; Inline ocarina; Multi chambered ocarina; Keyed ocarina; Slide ocarina		aerophones	421.221.42	Italy	fipple flutes	ocarina
Octavin		aerophones	422.2	Germany	reed	clarinet
Ophicleide or Quinticlave		aerophones	423.21	France	brass instruments	trumpet
Organ		aerophones	412.132	As a Keyboard Section, Not part of the woodwind section but woodwind in some older and Keyboard in others	woodwinds	set of flutes
Orthotonophonium		aerophones	412.132	Germany	free reed aerophones	harmonium reed organ
Paixiao		aerophones	421.112	China	woodwinds	pan flute
Palendag or pulalu		aerophones	421.111.12	Philippines	woodwinds	end-blown flute
Pan flute		aerophones	421.112	South America	woodwinds	pan flute
Pasiyak or water whistle		aerophones	4	Philippines	fipple flutes	recorder
Pastoral pipes		aerophones			woodwinds	bagpipe
Pavri		aerophones	421.121.12	India	woodwinds	flute
Pi		aerophones		Thailand	woodwinds	
Pibgorn		aerophones	422.2	Wales	reed	clarinet
Picco pipe		aerophones	421.221.12	Western Europe	fipple flutes	recorder
Piccolo		aerophones	421.121.12	Western Europe	woodwinds	flute
Piccolo trumpet		aerophones	423.232	Western Europe	brass instruments	trumpet
Pifilca		aerophones	421.111.22	Mapuche people		flute
Pipe organ (diaphone pipes)	Diaphone pipe (image not shown, only a 5-manual keyboard)	aerophones	412.132		free reed	reed organ
Pipe organ (flue pipes)	Flue pipes	aerophones	421.221.11		fipple flutes	recorder
Pipe organ (free reed pipes)		aerophones	412.132		free reed	reed organ
Pipe organ (reed pipes)		aerophones	422.112		reed	organ
Piri		aerophones		Korea		
Pitch pipe		aerophones	412.131		free reed	pitch pipe
Pku		aerophones		Armenia		
Ploy		aerophones		Cambodia		
Pocket trumpet		aerophones	423.232	United States	brass instruments	trumpet
Post horn		aerophones	423.121.22	Western Europe	brass instruments	trumpet
Pu		aerophones	423.111	Polynesia	trumpets	conch
Pump organ or reed organ or harmonium		aerophones	412.132		free reed	reed organ
Pungi		aerophones	422.22	India		
Pūtōrino		aerophones	432.232	New Zealand	woodwinds brass instruments	flute trumpet
Quena		aerophones	421.111.12	South America	woodwinds	end-blown flute
Raj		aerophones	412.132	Hmong people (China)	free reed	harmonica
Rackett		aerophones	422.111.2	Western Europe	reed	oboe
Ralé-poussé		aerophones		Réunion	free reed	accordion
Rauschpfeife		aerophones	422.112.2	Europe	reed	oboe
Recorder: Garklein; Sopranino; Descant; Treble or alto; Tenor; Bass; Great bass; Contra bass; Subcontra bass; Sub-subcontrabass; Venova		aerophones	421.221.12	Germany	fipple flutes	recorder
Reed contrabass		aerophones	422.112.2	Belgium	reed	oboe
Regal		aerophones	412.12		Brass	organ
Rhaita (ghaita)		aerophones	422.112.2	Northern Africa	reed	oboe
Rih		aerophones	421.211.2			
Robero		aerophones	422.2	Spain	reed instruments	clarinet
Roman tuba		aerophones	423.121.11	Etruscan	brass instruments	trumpet
Rondador		aerophones	421.112.11	Ecuador		
Rosem		aerophones	421.121	India	woodwinds	Flute
Rothphones: Soprano rothphone; Alto rothphone; Tenor rothphone; Baritone rothphone; Bass rothphone		aerophones	422.112.2	Italy	reed	sarrusophone
Ryuteki		aerophones	421.121.12	Japan	woodwinds	flute
Sac de gemecs		aerophones		Andorra; Catalonia		bagpipe
Sackbut: Alto sackbut; Tenor sackbut; Bass sackbut; Contrabass sackbut		aerophones	423.22	France	brass instruments	trombone
Saenghwang		aerophones	412.132	Korea	free reed	harmonica
Saratovskaya garmonika		aerophones	412.132	Russia	free reed	accordion
Sarrusophones: Sopranino sarrusophone; Soprano sarrusophone; Alto sarrusophone; Tenor sarrusophone; Baritone sarrusophone; Bass sarrusophone; Contrabass sarrusophone		aerophones	422.112.2	France	reed	oboe
Saxophones: Piccolo saxophone (Soprillo); Sopranino saxophone; C Soprano saxophone; Soprano saxophone; Mezzo-soprano saxophone (Alto in F); Alto saxophone; C melody saxophone (Tenor in C); Tenor saxophone; Baritone saxophone; Bass saxophone; Contrabass saxophone; Subcontrabass saxophone		aerophones	422.212	Belgium	reed instruments	clarinet
Saxhorn		aerophones	423.231	Belgium	brass instruments	trumpet
Saxotromba		aerophones	423.231	Belgium	brass instruments	trumpet
Saxtuba		aerophones	423.231	Belgium	brass instruments	trumpet
Scat singing		aerophones	43		vocal techniques	human voice
Schwyzerörgeli		aerophones	412.132	Switzerland	free reed instruments	accordion
Serpent		aerophones	423.21	France	brass instruments	trumpet, cornett
Shakuhachi		aerophones	421.111.12	Japan	woodwinds	end-blown flute
Shankha		aerophones	423.111	India	trumpets	conch
Shapar		aerophones		Russia		bagpipe
Shawm		aerophones	422.112.2	Switzerland	reed instruments	oboe
Shehnai		aerophones	422.112.2	North India	reed instruments	oboe
Sheng		aerophones	412.132	China	free reed instruments	harmonica
Shinobue		aerophones	421.121.12	Japan	woodwinds	flute
Shofar		aerophones	423.121.21	Levant	natural trumpets	trumpet
Shō		aerophones	441.21	Japan	free reed	harmonica
Shvi		aerophones	421.221.12	Armenia	fipple flutes	recorder
Shyuvr		aerophones			reed instruments	bagpipe
Siku: Zampoña; Samponia		aerophones	421.112	Bolivia; Peru	woodwinds	pan flute
Sipsi		aerophones	422.211.2	Turkey	woodwinds	
Siren		aerophones	41	Scotland	noise makers	siren
Slide trumpet: Medieval slide trumpet; Renaissance slide trumpet; Baroque slide trumpet		aerophones	423.21/22	Europe	brass instruments	trumpet
Slide whistle: Jazz flute; Swanee whistle		aerophones	421.121.312	England	fipple flutes	whistle
Sneng		aerophones	422.212	Cambodia	reed instruments	hornpipe
Sodina		aerophones	421.111.12	Madagascar	woodwinds	end-blown flute
Sompoton		aerophones		Malaysia		mouth organ
Sopila		aerophones	422.112.2	Croatia	reed instruments	oboe
Sopilka		aerophones	421.111-12	Ukraine	Woodwind	
Soprano		aerophones	43		vocal registers	human voice
Sorna		aerophones	422.112.2	Iran	reed instruments	oboe
Sousaphone		aerophones	423.232	United States	brass instruments	trumpet tuba
Spilåpipa		aerophones		Sweden		
Sralai		aerophones	422.112.2	Cambodia	reed instruments	oboe
Sringa		aerophones		India	wind instrument	horn
Sruti upanga		aerophones		India		bagpipe
Stabule		aerophones	421.221.12		woodwind	
Steerhorn		aerophones	4		brass instruments	horn
Sudrophone		aerophones	423.21	France	brass instruments	trumpet ophicleide
Suling		aerophones	421.111.12	Indonesia; Philippines	woodwinds	end-blown flute
Suona: Laba; Haidi		aerophones	422.112.2	China	reed instruments	oboe
Superbone		aerophones	423.22	Canada	brass instruments	trombone
Svirel		aerophones				
Swordblade		aerophones	411		noise makers	whip
Sybyzgy		aerophones	421.311	Turkey	reed or wood	flutes
Symphonic organ		aerophones	421.221.11	Western Europe	other	set of flutes
Tabor pipe		aerophones	421.221.12	Western Europe	fipple flutes	recorder
Taepyeongso		aerophones	422.112.2	Korea	reed instruments	oboe suona
Taille		aerophones		France		oboe
Tangmuri		aerophones		Northeast India		
Tarka		aerophones	4	Bolivia		
Tarpa		aerophones	4	India		
Tárogató		aerophones	422.112-71	Central Europe	reed instruments	oboe suona
Telenka		aerophones	421.111-1	Ukraine		
Tenoroon		aerophones	422.112		brass instruments	Bassoon
Tenora *Tible		aerophones	422.112	Spain	reed instruments	oboe shawm
Tibetan horn		aerophones	4	Tíbet	brass instruments	horn
Tin whistle		aerophones	421.221.12	Celtic	fipple flutes	recorder
Toasting		aerophones	43		vocal technique	human voice
Tonette		aerophones	421.111.12	North America	woodwinds	end-blown flute
Torupill		aerophones		Estonia		bagpipe
Trembita		aerophones	423.121-12	Ukraine	woodwind	alpine horn
Trikiti		aerophones	412.132	Spain	free reed instruments	accordion
Trombones: Piccolo trombone; Soprano trombone; Alto trombone; Tenor trombone; Bass trombone; Contrabass trombone; Valve trombone; Superbone		aerophones	423.22	Western Europe	brass instruments	trombone
Trombonium		aerophones	423.233.2		brass instruments	trombone
Tromboon		aerophones	422.112.2	United States	reed instruments	bassoon trombone
Trompa de Ribagorza		aerophones				
Trompeta china		aerophones	422.112.2	Cuba	reed instruments	oboe suona
Truba		aerophones	422.121-1	Ukraine		
Trumpets: Soprano trumpet; Bass trumpet; Baroque trumpet; Bass trumpet; Rotary valve trumpet		aerophones	423.232		brass instruments	trumpet
Trutruca		aerophones		Chile; Argentina		trumpet
Tsampouna		aerophones	4	Greece		bagpipe
Tsuur		aerophones	4	Mongolia		flute
Tuba: Bass tuba; Contrabass tuba; Subcontrabass tuba		aerophones	423.232	Germany	brass instruments	trumpet
Tubax: Contrabass (in E♭); Subcontrabass (in B♭)		aerophones	422.212	Germany	woodwinds	saxophone
Tube trumpet		aerophones	423.1		natural trumpets	trumpet
Tumpong		aerophones	421.111.12	Philippines	woodwinds	end-blown flute
Tungso		aerophones	421.111.12	Korea	woodwinds	end-blown flute
Tutek		aerophones	4	Azerbaijan	woodwinds	flute
Txistu		aerophones	421.221.12	Spain	fipple flutes	recorder
Uilleann pipes		aerophones	422	Ireland	reed instruments	bagpipe
Venova		aerophones	422.2	Japan	woodwinds	saxophone
Venu		aerophones	421.121.12	South India	woodwinds	flute
Veuze		aerophones		Brittany		bagpipe
Vibrandoneon		aerophones	412.132	Italy; Germany	free reed instruments	reed organ
Vienna horn		aerophones	423.232	Austria	brass instruments	trumpet, French horn
Volynka		aerophones	421.111-12	Ukraine		bagpipe
Vuvuzela		aerophones	423.121.22	South-Africa	natural trumpets	trumpet
Wagner tuba		aerophones	423.232	Germany	brass instruments	trumpet
Washint		aerophones	421.111.12	Ethiopia	woodwinds	end-blown flute
Western concert flutes: Flute; Alto flute; Bass flute; Contra-alto flute; Contrabass flute; Subcontrabass flute; Double contrabass flute; Hyperbass flute		aerophones	421.121.12	Western Europe	woodwinds	flute
Wiener oboe		aerophones	422.112-71	Austria	woodwinds	oboe
Willow flute		aerophones	421.221.11	Scandinavia	fipple flutes	recorder
Wot		aerophones	421.112	Thailand	panpipe	
Xaphoon		aerophones	422.2	Hawaii	woodwinds	clarinet
Xeremia		aerophones		Balearic Islands		bagpipe
xeremieta		aerophones	422.221.2	Spain		
Xiao		aerophones	421.111.12	China	woodwinds	end-blown flute
Xun		aerophones	421.221.42	China	fipple flutes	ocarina
Xutuli		aerophones		India		
Yokobue		aerophones		Japan	flute	
Yotar		aerophones	4	Persia	woodwinds	flute
Yu		aerophones	412.132	China	free reed instruments	harmonica
Zhaleika		aerophones	422.211.2	Russia	reed instruments	clarinet
Zubivka		aerophones	421.111-12	Ukraine		
Zufolo		aerophones	421.111.12	Italy	fipple flutes	recorder
Zugtrompete		aerophones	423.21/22	Germany	brass instruments	trumpet, slide trumpet
Zukra		aerophones				
Zurna		aerophones	422.112.2	Turkey	reed instruments	oboe

== Stringed instruments (chordophones) ==
Instrument	Picture	Classification	H-S Number	Origin	Common classification	Relation
Adungu		chordophones	3	Uganda	stringed instruments	
Aeolian harp		chordophones	3	Germany	stringed instruments	
Agiarut		chordophones	3	Canada	stringed instruments	
Ajaeng		chordophones	3	Korea	stringed instruments	
Akkordolia		chordophones	3	Austria; Germany	stringed instruments	
Akonting		chordophones	321.311	Senegal; Gambia	stringed instruments	
Algerian mandole		chordophones	321.322	Algeria	stringed instruments	
Anandalahari		chordophones	311.121.222	Bengal	stringed instruments	
Angélique		chordophones	321.321		stringed instruments	
Apkhyarta		chordophones		Abkhazia	Bowed string instrument	
Appalachian dulcimer		chordophones	314.122-5	Germany; United States	stringed instruments	
Arbajo		chordophones	321.321-6	Nepal	stringed instruments	
Archlute		chordophones	321.321	Western Europe	stringed instruments	
Armónico		chordophones	3	Cuba	stringed instruments	
Arpeggione		chordophones	3	Austria	stringed instruments	
Autoharp		chordophones	321.312	United States	stringed instruments	
Bağlama		chordophones	321.321	Turkey	stringed instruments	
Bajo sexto		chordophones	3	Mexico	stringed instruments	
Balalaika		chordophones	321.321	Russia	stringed instruments	
Bandola		chordophones	321.322	Colombia; Venezuela	stringed instruments	
Bandolin		chordophones	3	Ecuador	stringed instruments	
Bandolón		chordophones	3	Mexico	stringed instruments	
Bandura		chordophones	321.321	Ukraine	stringed instruments	
Bandora		chordophones	321.321	England	stringed instruments	
Bandurria		chordophones	321.321	Aragon; Philippines; Spain	stringed instruments	
Banhu		chordophones	321.321	China	stringed instruments	
Banjo: Banjo cello; Bass banjo; Five-stringed banjo; Bluegrass banjo; Four-stringed banjo; Plectrum banjo; Six-stringed banjo; Tenor banjo; Zither banjo		chordophones	3	North America	stringed instruments	
Banjo ukulele		chordophones	3	United States	stringed instruments	
Barbat		chordophones	321.321	Armenia; Iran	stringed instruments	
Barbiton		chordophones	3	Greek	stringed instruments	
Baryton		chordophones	3	England	stringed instruments	
Basolia		chordophones	321.321-71	Ukraine; Polish	stringed instruments	
Bazantar		chordophones			stringed instruments	
Begena		chordophones	321.2		stringed instruments	
Belly harp		chordophones	322.11	West Africa	stringed instruments	
Benju		chordophones			stringed instruments	citar
Berimbau		chordophones	311.121	Brazil	stringed instruments	
Bipa		chordophones	3	Korea	stringed instruments	
Biwa		chordophones	321.321	Japan	stringed instruments	
Bobbili veena		chordophones	3	India	stringed instruments	
Bordonua		chordophones	321.32	Puerto Rico	stringed instruments	lute
Bouzouki		chordophones	321.321	Greece	stringed instruments	
Bowed psaltery		chordophones			Bowed string instrument	
Bulbul tarang		chordophones	314.122	India	stringed instruments	citar
Bunker Touch Guitar		chordophones	321.322		stringed instruments	
Buzuq		chordophones	321.321	Saudi Arabia	stringed instruments	
Byzaanchy		chordophones	321.313		Bowed string instrument	lute
Calabrian lira		chordophones	321.321-71	Byzantine Empire	Necked bowl lutes	
Carimba		chordophones	3	Mexico	stringed instruments	
Cavaquinho		chordophones	3	Portugal	stringed instruments	
Cekuntrung		chordophones		Indonesia	stringed instruments	
Cello (violoncello): Cello da spalla; Electric cello		chordophones	3		stringed instruments	
Çeng		chordophones	322.12	Ottoman	stringed instruments	
Cetara		chordophones	111.224-4		stringed instruments	
Chakhe		chordophones	314.122	Cambodia; Thailand	stringed instruments	
Chang		chordophones	322.12	Persia	stringed instruments	
Chanzy		chordophones	321.322	Tuva	stringed instruments	lute
Chapman stick		chordophones	321.322	United States	stringed instruments	
Charangos: Charango; Charangón; Hualaycho (Walaycho); Ronroco; Hatun charango; Chillador; Ayacucho; Bajo charango; Chango; Charango mediano; KhonKhota; Moquegua; Pampeno; Shreiker; Sonko; Vallegrandino		chordophones	321.321	Argentina; Bolivia; Chile; Peru	stringed instruments	
Chikara		chordophones	3	India	stringed instruments	
Chitarra battente		chordophones	3	Italy	stringed instruments	
Chitarra Italiana		chordophones	321.322		stringed instruments	
Choghur		chordophones	321.322-41	Azerbaijan	stringed instruments	lute
Chuniri		chordophones	321.22	Georgia	Bowed stringed instruments	lyre
Çifteli		chordophones	321.321-5	Albanian	stringed instruments	
Cimbalom: Electric cymbalum		chordophones	3	Central and Eastern Europe	stringed instruments	
Cimboa		chordophones	321.322	Cape Verde	stringed instruments	
Citole		chordophones	3	Western Europe	stringed instruments	
Cittern		chordophones	321.322	England; Scotland; Switzerland	stringed instruments	
Clavichord		chordophones	311.121	Western Europe	stringed instruments	
Clavinet		chordophones	321.322-6	United States	stringed instruments	
Cobza		chordophones	321.321-6	Romania	stringed instruments	
Colascione		chordophones	321.322	Italy	stringed instruments	
Concheras: mandolinos de concheros or mandolina conchera; vihuelas de concheros or vihuela conchera; guitarras de concheros or guitarra conchera		chordophones	321.321-6	Mexico	stringed instruments	charango mandolin Mexican vihuela guitar
Contra-Drone Harpa		chordophones	×	Sweden	chordophone	nyckelharpa
Contraguitar		chordophones	3		stringed instruments	
Crwth (Crowd)		chordophones	3	Wales	stringed instruments	
Cuatro		chordophones	3	Latin America	stringed instruments	
Cümbüş		chordophones	3	Turkey	stringed instruments	
Cura		chordophones	321.321	Turkey	Plucked string instruments	
Đàn bầu		chordophones	3	Vietnam	stringed instruments	
Đàn đáy		chordophones	3	Vietnam	stringed instruments	
Đàn gáo		chordophones	3	Vietnam	stringed instruments	
Đàn nguyệt		chordophones	3	Vietnam	stringed instruments	
Đàn tam thập lục		chordophones	3	Vietnam	stringed instruments	
Đàn tranh		chordophones	3	Vietnam	stringed instruments	
Đàn tre		chordophones	3	Vietnam	stringed instruments	
Đàn tứ		chordophones		Vietnam	stringed instruments	
Đàn tỳ bà		chordophones	3	Vietnam	stringed instruments	
Dangubica		chordophones	321.322	Croatia; Serbia	stringed instruments	
Diddley bow		chordophones	3	United States	stringed instruments	
Dihu		chordophones	3	China	stringed instruments	
Dilruba		chordophones	321.31	India	stringed instruments	lute
Dombra		chordophones	321.321	Kazakhstan	stringed instruments	
Domra		chordophones	321.321	Russia	stringed instruments	
Doshpuluur		chordophones	321.322	Tuva	stringed instruments	
Dotara		chordophones	321.321-6	Bangladesh	stringed instruments	
Double bass: Five-string double bass		chordophones	321.322-71	Western Europe	stringed instruments	
Dramyin		chordophones	321.321-6	Himalayan	String instrument Plucked	
Dreadnought		chordophones	3		stringed instruments	
Dulcimer		chordophones	314.122	England	stringed instruments	
Dutar		chordophones	321.322	Turkmenistan; Uzbekistan	stringed instruments	
Duxianqin		chordophones	312.22-5	China	stringed instruments	
Ektara		chordophones	33-5	India; Pakistan	stringed instruments	
Epigonion		chordophones	321.3	Greece	stringed instruments	
Epinette des Vosges		chordophones	314.122	France	stringed instruments	zither
Erhu		chordophones	321.321	China	stringed instruments	
Erxian		chordophones	321.321	China	stringed instruments	lute
Esraj		chordophones	321.321	India	stringed instruments	lute
Fiddle		chordophones	321.322-71	Western Europe	stringed instruments	
Gadulka		chordophones	321.321-71	Ukraine	stringed instruments	
Gaohu		chordophones	321.312	China	stringed instruments	lute
Gayageum		chordophones	312.22	Korea	stringed instruments	citar
Geomungo		chordophones	312.22	Korea	stringed instruments	citar
Ghaychak		chordophones	321.31		Bowed string instrument	
Ghijak		chordophones	321.331		Bowed string instrument	
Gittern		chordophones	3	Western Europe	stringed instruments	
Goje		chordophones	321.311	West Africa	Bowed string instrument	
Gottan		chordophones	3	Japan	Plucked string instrument	
Gottuvadhyam		chordophones	321.3	India	stringed instruments	
Gravikord		chordophones	314.221.12	United States	stringed instruments	
Gue		chordophones			stringed instruments	
Guitalin		chordophones	321.321-6	United States	Plucked string instrument	lute
Guitars: Acoustic guitar; Acoustic bass guitar; Acoustic-electric guitar; Archtop guitar; Baritone guitar; Baroque guitar; Bass guitar; Bahian guitar; Brahms guitar; Chitarra battente; Cigar box guitar; Classical guitar; Console steel guitar; Electric guitar; English guitar; Fretless guitar; Lyre-guitar; Extended-range guitars; Alto guitar; Seven-string guitar; Eight-string guitar; Nine-string guitar; Ten-string guitar; Eleven-string alto guitar; Twelve-string guitar; Flamenco guitar; Guitarra quinta huapanguera; Guitar synthesizer; Guitarrón (chileno); Guitarrón (mexicano); Guitarrón (uruguayo); Gut-stringed guitars; Lap steel guitars; Dobro; National Steel; Multi-neck guitar; Double-neck guitar; Triple-neck guitar; Quadruple-neck guitar; Five-neck guitar; Six-neck guitar; Seven-neck guitar; Eight-neck guitar; Rock Ock; Twelve-neck guitar; Octave guitar; Parlor guitar; Pedal steel guitar; Resophonic guitar; Romantic guitar; Russian guitar; Selmer guitar; Semi-acoustic guitar; Slide guitar; Silent guitar; Steel guitar; Steel-string acoustic guitar; Tenor guitar; Terz guitar; Yotar		chordophones	3	Spain, et al	stringed instruments	
Guitarra de golpe		chordophones	3	Mexico	stringed instruments	
Guitarra panzona		chordophones	3	Mexico	stringed instruments	
Guitarra séptima		chordophones	3	Mexico	stringed instruments	
Guitarro		chordophones	3	Andalusia; Aragon; Spain	stringed instruments	
Guitolão		chordophones		Portugal	stringed instruments	
Guntang		chordophones	312.11	Indonesia	stringed instruments	Tube zither
Gusle		chordophones	321.321-71	Albania; Bosnia; Serbia	Bowed string instrument	
Gusli		chordophones	3	Russia	stringed instruments	
Guqin		chordophones	312.22	China	stringed instruments	
Guzheng		chordophones	312.22	China	stringed instruments	
Haegeum		chordophones	321.32	Korea	stringed instruments	
Hammered dulcimer		chordophones	3	Austria; England; Germany; Hungary; Poland; Romania; Saudi Arabia; United States	stringed instruments	
Hardanger fiddle		chordophones	3	Norway	stringed instruments	
Harp: Electric harp		chordophones	3	Worldwide	stringed instruments	
Harpejji		chordophones	323		electric stringed instrument	
Harp guitar		chordophones	3	France	stringed instruments	
Harpsichord		chordophones	3	Western Europe	stringed instruments	
Hasapi		chordophones	321.321	Indonesia	stringed instruments	
Huapanguera		chordophones	3	Mexico	stringed instruments	
Huluhu		chordophones	321.313	China	stringed instruments	
Hummel		chordophones	3	Northern European	stringed instruments	zither
Huobosi		chordophones	321.312	China	stringed instruments	
Huqin		chordophones	3	China	stringed instruments	
Hurdy-gurdy		chordophones	3	Spain	stringed instruments	
Icelandic fiddle (fiðla)		chordophones	321.321-6	Iceland	stringed instruments	
Ichigenkin		chordophones	3		stringed instruments	
Igil		chordophones	321.321	Tuva	stringed instruments	
Imzad		chordophones	3		stringed instruments	
Inanga		chordophones	315.1		trough zither	
Irish bouzouki		chordophones	321.322	Greece; Ireland	stringed instruments	
Jadagan		chordophones	3	Siberia	stringed instruments	Box zither
Janzi		chordophones	3	Uganda	stringed instruments	
Jarana huasteca		chordophones	3	Mexico	stringed instruments	
Jarana jarocha: Jarana chaquiste; Jarana mosquito; Jarana primera; Jarana segunda; Jarana tercera		chordophones	3	Mexico	stringed instruments	
Jetigen		chordophones	3	Kazakhstan	stringed instruments	
Jiaohu		chordophones	3	China	stringed instruments	
Jouhikko		chordophones	321.22-71	Finland	Bowed string instrument	Lyre
Kabosy		chordophones	3	Madagascar	stringed instruments	
Kacapi		chordophones	3	Indonesia	stringed instruments	
Kamancha (kamancheh)		chordophones	3	Persia	stringed instruments	
Kannel		chordophones	314.122-5	Estonia	stringed instruments	
Kanklės		chordophones	314.122	Lithuania	Plucked string instrument	
Kantele		chordophones	314.122-5	Finland	stringed instruments	
Kemane of Cappadocia		chordophones	321.322.71	Greece	stringed instruments	Lyre
Kemenche: Kemençe of the Black Sea		chordophones	322.122.1	Turkey	stringed instruments	
Kendara		chordophones	321.322-71	Indian	stringed instruments	
Khim		chordophones	3	Thailand; Cambodia	stringed instruments	hammered dulcimer cimbalom
Khonkhota		chordophones	3	Bolivia	stringed instruments	
Khushtar		chordophones	3	Chinese	stringed instruments	
Kinnari veena		chordophones	3	India	stringed instruments	
Kissar		chordophones	123.5			
Kobza		chordophones	3	Ukraine	stringed instruments	
Kobyz		chordophones	3	Kazakhstan	stringed instruments	
Kokle		chordophones	314.122-5	Latvia	stringed instruments	
Kokyū		chordophones	3	Japan	stringed instruments	huqin rebab
Komuz (kopuz, qomuz)		chordophones	3	Kyrgyzstan	stringed instruments	
Konghou		chordophones	321.3	China	stringed instruments	Harp
Kontra		chordophones	3	Hungary	stringed instruments	
Kora		chordophones	323-5	West Africa	stringed instruments	
Koto		chordophones	3	Japan	stringed instruments	
Kozobas		chordophones	321.322-71+111.2	Ukraine	stringed instruments	
Krachappi		chordophones	3	Thailand	stringed instruments	
Krar		chordophones	3	Ethiopia; Eritrea	stringed instruments	
Krez		chordophones	314.122-5	Russia	stringed instruments	lute
Kubing		chordophones	3	Philippines	stringed instruments	
Kudyapi (kutiyapi)		chordophones	3	Philippines	stringed instruments	
Kulibit		chordophones	312.11	Philippines	tube zither	
Kurdish tanbur		chordophones	3		plucked string instrument	
Kwitra		chordophones	3	Algeria	stringed instruments	lute chitarra Italiana
Langeleik		chordophones	3	Norway	stringed instruments	
Langspil		chordophones	314.1	Iceland	stringed instruments	
Laouto		chordophones	321.321-6	Greece	stringed instruments	
Laruan		chordophones	3	China	stringed instruments	cello ruan
Laúd		chordophones	321.321	Cuba; Philippines; Spain	stringed instruments	
Lautenwerck		chordophones	3			
Lavta		chordophones	321.321-6	Armenia; Greece; Turkey	stringed instruments	
Leiqin		chordophones	3	China	stringed instruments	
Leona		chordophones	3	Mexico	stringed instruments	
Lesiba		chordophones	311.121.222	South Africa; Lesotho	stringed instruments	
Lijerica		chordophones	321.321-71	Bosnia; Croatia	stringed instruments	
Lirone		chordophones	3	Italy	stringed instruments	
Liuqin		chordophones	321.321	China	stringed instruments	
Lokanga		chordophones	3	Madagascar	stringed instruments	violin
Lute		chordophones	3	Western Europe	stringed instruments	
Lute guitar		chordophones	3	Germany	stringed instruments	
Lyra (Cretan)		chordophones	321.321-71	Greece	stringed instruments	
Lyra (Byzantine)		chordophones	3	Byzantine Empire	stringed instruments	
Lyre		chordophones	321.2	England; Greece	stringed instruments	
Maghreb rebab		chordophones	321.71		bowed string instrument	
Maguhu		chordophones	3	China	stringed instruments	
Mandobass		chordophones	3		stringed instruments	
Mandola		chordophones	3		stringed instruments	
Mandolin: Mandolin-banjo; Mandocello; Mandola; Bluegrass mandolin; Electric mandolin; Octave mandolin; Resonator mandolin		chordophones	321.321-6 or 321.322-6	Bashkortostan; Brazil; Germany; Greece; Italy; Japan; Portugal; Ukraine; United States; Venezuela	stringed instruments	
Mandolute		chordophones	3		stringed instruments	
Mandora (gallichon)		chordophones	321.321	Central Europe	stringed instruments	
Mandore		chordophones	321.321	France	stringed instruments	
Marovany		chordophones	3	Madagascar	stringed instruments	
Marxophone		chordophones	3		stringed instruments	
Masenqo		chordophones	321.311		stringed instruments	
Megatar		chordophones	321.322	United States	stringed instruments	
Mejoranera (mejorana)		chordophones	321.322	Panama	stringed instruments	
Mexican vihuela		chordophones	3	Mexico	stringed instruments	
Mi gyaung		chordophones	3	Burma	String instrument plucked	
Mohan veena		chordophones	3	India	stringed instruments	
Moodswinger		chordophones	322.221		stringed instruments	
Moraharpa		chordophones	3	Sweden	stringed instruments	
Morin khuur		chordophones	321.312	Mongolia; Tuva	stringed instruments	lute
Musical bow		chordophones	3	South Africa	stringed instruments	
Mvet		chordophones	3	Gabon	stringed instruments	
Ngombi		chordophones	321.322	Gabon	stringed instruments	
Nyatiti		chordophones	3	Kenya	stringed instruments	
Nyckelharpa		chordophones	321.322-71	Sweden	stringed instruments	
Octavina		chordophones	321.322	Perú; Ecuador	stringed instruments	
Octobass		chordophones	321.322-71	France	stringed instruments	
Onavillu		chordophones	322.21	India	stringed instruments	citar
Orpharion		chordophones	321.322		stringed instruments	
Orphica		chordophones	321.321	Austria	stringed instruments	
Oud		chordophones	321.321-6	Armenia; Azerbaijan; Greece; Iran; Kurdistan; Saudi Arabia; Turkey	stringed instruments	
Pamiri rubab		chordophones	3	Tajikistan	stringed instruments	
Panduri		chordophones	321.321	Georgia	Plucked string instrument	lute
Pantalon		chordophones	3		string instrument	
Paqin		chordophones	3	China	stringed instruments	
Pena		chordophones		India	string instrument	lute
Piano (pianoforte): Grand piano; Upright piano; Player piano; Electric piano; Fortepiano; Pedal piano		chordophones	314.122-4-8	Italy	stringed instruments	
Phandar		chordophones	3	Chechnya	stringed instruments	Plucked
Philomel		chordophones	3	Germany	stringed instruments	
Phin		chordophones	3	Thailand	stringed instruments	
Pipa		chordophones	3	China	stringed instruments	
Piwancha		chordophones	3	Nepal	stringed instruments	
Pochette		chordophones	3		stringed instruments	
Portuguese guitar		chordophones	3	Portugal	stringed instruments	
Psaltery		chordophones	3	Greece	stringed instruments	
Psalmodicon		chordophones	3	Scandinavia	stringed instruments	
Puerto Rican cuatro		chordophones	3	Puerto Rico	stringed instruments	
Qanbūs		chordophones	321.321	Yemen	stringed instruments	
Qanun		chordophones	3	Armenia; Egypt; Greece; Saudi Arabia; Turkey	stringed instruments	
Qinqin		chordophones	3	China	stringed instruments	
Rabeca		chordophones	3	Brazil	stringed instruments	rebec
Rabel		chordophones	3		stringed instruments	
Rajão		chordophones	3	Portugal	stringed instruments	
Ravanahatha		chordophones	321.312	Sri Lanka; India	stringed instruments	
Rawap		chordophones	321.321-6		stringed instruments	
Rebab		chordophones	321.321	Afghanistan	stringed instruments	
Rebec		chordophones	321.21-71	Italy; Switzerland	stringed instruments	
Requinto jarocho		chordophones	3	Mexico	stringed instruments	
Rubab		chordophones	321.321-6	Afghanistan	stringed instruments	
Ruan: Gaoyinruan; Xiaoruan; Zhongruan; Daruan; Diyinruan		chordophones	3	China	stringed instruments	
Rudra vina		chordophones	311.222	India	stringed instruments	
Salo		chordophones	3	Thailand	stringed instruments	
Sallameh		chordophones	3	Iran	stringed instruments	
Sambuca		chordophones	322.12	Greece	stringed instruments	harp
Sanshin		chordophones	321.312-6	Okinawa	stringed instruments	
Santoor		chordophones	314.122-4	India	stringed instruments	
Santur		chordophones	314.122	Iran	stringed instruments	
Sanxian		chordophones	321.312	China	stringed instruments	
Sapeh		chordophones	321.3	Indonesia	stringed instruments	
Sarangi		chordophones	321.322	India	stringed instruments	
Saraswati veena		chordophones	321.321	India	stringed instruments	lute
Šargija		chordophones	321.321	Bosnia	stringed instruments	
Sarod		chordophones	321.321-6	India	stringed instruments	lute
Sataer		chordophones	3	Chinese	stringed instruments	
Saung		chordophones	322.11	Burma	stringed instruments	
Saw duang		chordophones	321.322	Thailand	stringed instruments	
Saw sam sai		chordophones	3	Thailand	stringed instruments	
Saw u		chordophones		Thailand	Bowed stringed instruments	
Scheitholt		chordophones	321.322	German	stringed instrument	
Se		chordophones	3	China	stringed instruments	
Seni rebab		chordophones			stringed instruments	
Seul		chordophones	3	Korea	stringed instruments	
Seperewa		chordophones	323-5	Ghana	stringed instruments	
Setar		chordophones	321.321	Azerbaijan; Iran	stringed instruments	lute
Shamisen		chordophones	321.312	Japan	stringed instruments	
Shanz		chordophones	321.312	Mongolia	stringed instruments	
Sihu		chordophones		China	stringed instruments	
Simbing		chordophones	323-5	West Africa	stringed instruments	harp-lutes
Simsimiyya		chordophones	321.21	Egypt	stringed instruments	
Sintir (guembri, gimbri, hejhouj)		chordophones	3	Algeria; Morocco	stringed instruments	
Sitar		chordophones	321.321	India	stringed instruments	
Sitarla		chordophones	3	Japan	stringed instruments	
Sohaegeum		chordophones	3	North Korea	stringed instruments	
Soku		chordophones			stringed instruments	
Streichmelodion		chordophones	314.122	Brno	stringed instruments	
Stroh violin		chordophones	321.322	London	Bowed string instrument	violin
Sueng		chordophones	3	Thailand	stringed instruments	
Suka		chordophones	311.121	Poland	stringed instruments	
Surbahar		chordophones	321.321	India	stringed instruments	
Swarmandal		chordophones	3	India	stringed instruments	autoharp board zither box zither psaltery qanun
Swedish lute		chordophones	3	Sweden	stringed instruments	lute
Taishōgoto		chordophones	321.321	Japan	stringed instruments	citar
Talharpa		chordophones	321.22-71		stringed instruments	
Tamburica		chordophones	321.321	Bosnia; Croatia; Hungary; Serbia	stringed instruments	
Tambur		chordophones	3	Iran; Kurdistan; Turkey	stringed instruments	
Tambura		chordophones	321.322	Bosnia; Bulgaria; North Macedonia	stringed instruments	
Tanggetang		chordophones	312.11		Tube zither	
Tanpura		chordophones	321.321	India	stringed instruments	
Tar		chordophones	3	Armenia; Azerbaijan; Iran; Kurdistan	stringed instruments	
Tarhu		chordophones	3	Australian	stringed instruments	
Taus		chordophones				
Tea chest bass		chordophones	3	Western Europe	stringed instruments	
Tembor		chordophones		Chinese	stringed instruments	
Tembûr		chordophones	3	curdo-persiano	stringed instruments	
Thanjavur veena		chordophones	321.321	India	stringed instruments	
Theorbo		chordophones	321.321	Europe	stringed instruments	
Timple		chordophones	3	Canary Islands	stringed instruments	
Tiple		chordophones	321.322	Colombia	stringed instruments	
Tonkori		chordophones	321.32	Japan	stringed instruments	
Torban		chordophones	321.321-5	Ukraine	stringed instruments	
Tovshuur		chordophones	321.321	Altai; Khakassia; Mongolia; Tuva	stringed instruments	
Tremoloa		chordophones	314.122-6	United States	stringed instruments	zither
Tres: Tres Cubano; Tres Puerto Rico		chordophones	321.322	Cuba	stringed instruments	
Tricordia		chordophones	321.321		stringed instruments	
Tro		chordophones	3	Cambodia	stringed instruments	
Tromba marina		chordophones	321.321-71	European	stringed instruments	
Trumpet marine (marine trumpet, nun's fiddle)		chordophones	3	Western Europe	stringed instruments	
Tsymbaly		chordophones	3	Ukraine; Belarus	stringed instruments	cimbalom hammered dulcimer
Tuhu		chordophones	3	China	stringed instruments	
Tumbi		chordophones		Punjab region	stringed instruments	
Tungna		chordophones	321.322	Nepal	stringed instruments plucked	
Tzouras		chordophones	321.321	Greece	stringed instruments	bouzouki
Ukulele: Concert ukulele; Electric ukulele; Harp ukulele; Lap steel ukulele; Pocket ukulele; Resonator ukulele; Soprano ukulele; Tahitian ukulele; Tenor ukulele; Eight-string tenor; Five-string tenor; Lili'u; Six-string tenor; Baritone ukulele; Bass ukulele; Contrabass ukulele; U-bass; Cigar box ukulele		chordophones	321.322	Portugal; Hawaii	stringed instruments	
Ukelin		chordophones	321.321		stringed instruments	lute
Umuduri		chordophones	311.111		stringed instruments	
Urni		chordophones		Nepal	stringed instruments	
Ütőgardon		chordophones	321.322		stringed instruments	
Valiha		chordophones	312.11	Madagascar	stringed instruments	
Veena		chordophones	3	India	stringed instruments	
Vertical viola (and other members of the violin octet family)		chordophones	3		stringed instruments	
Vichitra veena		chordophones	3	India	stringed instruments	
Vielle		chordophones	321.322-71	Western Europe	stringed instruments	
Vihuela		chordophones	321.32	Spain	stringed instruments	
Viol (viola de gamba): Pardessus de viole; Treble viol (dessus); Alto viol; Bass viol; Division viol; Lyra viol; Tenor viol (taille); Great bass violone; Contrabass violone		chordophones	321.322-71	Spain	stringed instruments	
Viola		chordophones	321.322-71		stringed instruments	
Viola amarantina		chordophones	3	Portugal	stringed instruments	
Viola bastarda		chordophones	3	Portugal	stringed instruments	
Viola beiroa		chordophones	3	Portugal	stringed instruments	
Viola caipira		chordophones	3	Brazil	stringed instruments	
Viola d'amore		chordophones	321.322-71		stringed instruments	
Viola da terra		chordophones	3	Azores; Portugal	stringed instruments	
Viola de arame		chordophones	3	Madeira; Portugal	stringed instruments	
Viola de cocho		chordophones	3	Brazil	stringed instruments	
Viola organista		chordophones	3	Italy (Da Vinci)	stringed instruments	
Viola profonda (tenor violin, violotta)		chordophones	3		stringed instruments	
Violin: Piccolo violino; Baroque violin; Bass violin; Electric violin; Five string violin; Stroh violin; Tenor violin		chordophones	321.322-71	Italy; Western Europe	stringed instruments	
Violinzither		chordophones	314.122-71		stringed instruments	
Violone		chordophones	3		stringed instruments	
Walaycho		chordophones	321.321-5	Bolivia; Peru	stringed instruments	
Waldzither		chordophones	321.322	Germany	stringed instruments	
Washtub bass		chordophones	3	United States	stringed instruments	
Whamola		chordophones	321.312	United States	stringed instruments	
Wheelharp		chordophones	3	United States	stringed instruments	viola organista
Xalam/Khalam		chordophones	321.321	West Africa	stringed instruments	
Yatga		chordophones	312.211-5	Mongolia	stringed instruments	Box zither
Yaybahar		chordophones		Turkey	acoustic musical instrument	
Yaylı tambur		chordophones	3	Turkey	stringed instruments	
Yanggeum		chordophones	312.21	Korea	stringed instruments	
Yangqin		chordophones	314.122-4	China	stringed instruments	
Yazh		chordophones	322.11		stringed instruments	
Yazheng		chordophones	312.22	China	stringed instruments	ajaeng
Yehu		chordophones	321.312	China	stringed instruments	
Yelatáj chos woley		chordophones	3	Argentina	stringed instruments	Musical bow
Yueqin		chordophones	321.322	China	stringed instruments	
Zeze		chordophones	311.221	Africa	stringed instruments	
Zhongruan		chordophones	321.32	China	stringed instruments	lute
Zhonghu		chordophones	321.322	China	stringed instruments	
Zhu		chordophones	311.121.222	China	stringed instruments	
Zhengni		chordophones	312.22-5	China	stringed instruments	citar
Zhuihu		chordophones	321.312	China	stringed instruments	lute
Zither: Alpine zither (harp zither); Concert zither; Guitar zither		chordophones	314.122	Germany; Austria; Greece; Central Europe	stringed instruments	

== Keyboard instruments ==
- Chromatic button accordion
- Claviharp
- Claviorgan
- Diatonic button accordion
- Electronic keyboard
- Electronic organ
- Free bass accordion
- Hammond organ
- Honky Tonk
- Indian harmonium
- Minipiano
- Orchestron
- Physharmonica
- Player piano
- Reed organ
- Schrammel accordion
- Square piano
- Steirische Harmonika
- Terpodion
- Virginals

== Electronic instruments (electrophones) ==
- AlphaSphere
- Audiocubes
- Bass pedals
- Continuum Fingerboard
- Croix Sonore
- Denis d'or
- Dubreq stylophone
- Drum machine
- Electric guitar
- Electronic bagpipes
- Electronic drum
- Electronic keyboard
  - Digital piano
- Electronic organ
- EWI
- Fingerboard synthesizer
- Hammond organ
- Keyboard
- Keytar
- Kraakdoos (or cracklebox)
- Laser harp
- Mellotron
- MIDI controller
  - Eigenharp
  - MIDI keyboard
  - Seaboard
- Moog synthesizer
- Omnichord
- Ondes Martenot
- Otamatone
- Personal computer (when used in conjunction with a software synthesizer and DAW)
  - Fairlight CMI (Computer Musical Instrument)
- Sampler
- Skoog
- Synclavier
- Synthesizer
- Teleharmonium
- Tenori-on
- Theremin
- trautonium
- Turntablism
- Turntable

== See also ==
- List of medieval musical instruments
- Fictional music#Fictional musical instruments
- List of folk music traditions
- List of musical instruments by Hornbostel–Sachs number
