= Tamborita =

Tamborita may refer to:

- Tamborita (Bolivia), a type of folk band from Bolivia
- Tamborita calentana, a folk drum from Mexico
