= Timur Ismagilov =

Russian composer (born 1982)

Timur Aleksandrovich Ismagilov
- Тиму́р Алекса́ндрович Исмаги́лов
- Born: February 27, 1982 (age 44); Ufa, Bashkortostan, Russia
- Education: Lyceum of Ufa State Institute of Arts, Moscow Conservatory
- Occupations: Composer, pianist

Timur Aleksandrovich Ismagilov (Russian: Тиму́р Алекса́ндрович Исмаги́лов; born 27 February 1982) is a Russian Bashkir composer and pianist. In his music he combines various composition techniques with a sustained interest in traditional Tatar and Bashkir melodic language.

== Biography ==
Timur Ismagilov was born in Ufa (Bashkortostan, Russia). As a child he taught himself to play all the musical instruments that were available at home: the piano and different types of accordion (bayan, talyanka, saratovskaya). He also performed and recorded as a singer of Tatar and Bashkir songs.

Ismagilov started to compose music at the age of 11 and attended Rustem Sabitov's composition class in 1995–2000. He graduated from the Lyceum of Ufa State Institute of Arts (Lyudmila Alexeeva's piano class). In 2005 he graduated from Alexander Tchaikovsky's composition class at the Moscow Conservatory.

In 2005–2008 he took a postgraduate course in the conservatory (academic advisor Alexander Tchaikovsky, scientific advisor Svetlana Savenko). The result was a musicological work titled "DSCH. Sketch of a Monograph about the Monogram". An article based on this study was published in Berlin in 2013.

In 2006 Timur Ismagilov founded the Sviatoslav Richter's memorial website. He has been organizing contemporary music concerts since 2010, and became one of the composers interviewed by Dmitry Bavilskiy for the book “To be called for: Conversations with contemporary composers” (published in 2014). Besides composing his own music, Ismagilov has made about 600 transcriptions and arrangements for different sets of instruments.

== Works ==
Orchestral music

- Concerto for cello and orchestra, op. 17 (2004–05)
- Elegy for string orchestra, op. 40 (2011, 2017)
- Changes II for piano, 15 strings and triangle ad libitum, op. 42 (2016–17)
- Addiction for orchestra, op. 44 (2018)

Chamber music

- Triptych for string quartet, op. 4 (1996)
- Epitaph for Alfred Schnittke for string quartet, piano and celesta, op. 6 (1998, rev. 2022)
- String Quartet, op. 14 (2002–03, rev. 2006)
- Fantasia for Violin and Piano, op. 16 (2003–04)
- EDES... for flute, clarinet, violin, cello and prepared piano, op. 20 (2007)
- Ozon kiy (Bashkir: Оҙон көй) for accordion, flute, clarinet, trumpet, violin, viola, cello and double bass, op. 21 (2008)
- Two Sketches and a Song for cello solo, op. 22 (2010)
- Novella for viola solo, op. 23 (2010)
- Evening Music for flute, violin, viola and cello, op. 24 (2010)
- Dialogue for violin solo, op. 27 (2011)
- Trio for violin, cello and piano, op. 31 (2013)
- Jacob's Ladder for double bass solo, op. 35 (2014)
- Sonata for Violin and Piano, op. 36 (2015)
- The Story of Dove for flute solo, op. 39 (2016)
- Fantasia for Clavichord (or piano), op. 43 (2018)
- Fantasia for Viola and Piano, op. 46 (2019–20)
- Fuga Idearum for flute, clarinet, violin, viola, cello and piano, op. 50 (2014, 2021–22)

Vocal music

- From Mustai Karim, diptych for male voice and piano, op. 9 (1999)
- The Story of One Picture after Arkady Averchenko for male voice, cello, piano, prepared piano and tape, op. 11 (2001)
- 121, vocal cycle on poems by Dmitry Prigov for male voice and piano, op. 15 (2003)
- From Hafez, vocal cycle for soprano and piano, op. 26 (2011)
- Three Epigrams for low male voice and piano, op. 41 (1999, 2017)
- Zen, vocal cycle on poems by Wang Wei for tenor and piano, op. 56 (2024)

Piano music

- Suite in Folk Style, op. 1 (1995–96)
- Variations on a Folk Theme, op. 2 (1995–96)
- Partita-Offering, op. 10 (2000)
- Homage to John Cage, op. 12 (2001)
- Variations on a Theme of Paganini, op. 13 (2002, rev. 2025)
- 24 Preludes, op. 18 (2005–10)
- Yashen (Bashkir: Йәшен) after the poem by Rashit Nazarov, op. 25 (2011)
- Five Bagatelles, op. 28 (2012)
- Axis, op. 32 (2012–13)
- Changes, op. 33 (2013)
- 7, op. 34 (2014)
- Three Pieces for Six Hands, op. 37 (2010–16)
- Spring Sketches, op. 38 (2016)
- What Next? ор. 47 (2020)
- Loneliness, ор. 48 (2020)
- Solitude, ор. 49 (2021)
- Nocturne and Postlude for the Right Hand, ор. 54 (2023–24)
- Prelude and Fugue for piano 5 hands, ор. 58 (2025)
- The Flow for 2 pianos (3 hands), ор. 60 (2025)
