= Lau (instrument) =

The lau (Khmer: ឡោ) is a Cambodian flat-faced gong, measuring approximately 25 centimeters across, used in Bassac theater for scenes requiring a loud instrument, such as battle scenes. It is also used to signal the entrance and exit of important characters.

The Lau is similar in shape to the Kong chmol which is also used in the Bassac theater. The instrument is large enough that it is hung on a frame, attached by a rope that goes through two holes in the instrument's edge. It is played with a wooden mallet, at a more sedate rate than percussion such as the chhing or pann. "While the Lau is struck once, the Chhing and Pann are struck twice."
