= Low Profile (New Zealand band) =

- Origin: New Zealand
- Genres: alternative rock
- Years active: 1982–1987
- Labels: Jayrem
- Members: Phil Bowering; Steve Garden; Mike Farrell; Louise Loft; Stuart Pearce; Roger Sellers

Low Profile were a New Zealand alternative rock band of the 1980s, formed by Phil Bowering (formerly of The Protons) and Steve Garden (Last Man Down, National Anthem), recording on the Jayrem label.

The band's lineup included – among others – the late Mike Farrell on guitar and vocals, Tom Ludvigson (the Jive Bombers, Snap, Bluespeak, Trip to the Moon) and Stuart Pearce (Coconut Rough).

Low Profile released two albums – Quiet Streets (1982) and Elephunkin' (1987), but are best remembered for their quirky single Elephunk in My Soup(mixed in Feb. 1984, released in 1984) with its unlikely instrumentation of hosepipe, slap bass and synthesizers, which was a staple of student radio in 1984. The Elephunk video was a finalist in the 1984 New Zealand music awards.

Two follow-up singles, The Cutting Edge (1986) and Simon Says (1987) did not fare as well.
