= Tamborita (Bolivia) =

A tamborita is a type of Bolivian ensemble which plays folk music. A typical group contains a tamborita (a type of bass drum), a caja (snare drum), a flute (which could be made of diverse materials), maracas and cymbals.

Its repertory covers brincaos, chobenas, carnavales, polcas, cuecas, cumbias, and canciones (songs) from Bolivia, Mexico and other South American countries.
