= Philomel (musical instrument) =

Stringed instrument

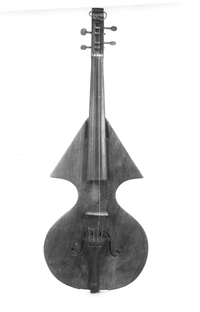
A picture of the instrument.

The philomel (French: Philomèle; German: Philomele or Stahlgeige Italian: Filomela) is a musical instrument similar to the violin, but having four steel wire strings. The fingerboard is fretless, like the violin.

It was invented around Monaco di Baviera in the middle of the nineteenth century and has similarities with the Bowedmelodion, also known as the Streichmelodion.

The philomel has a body with incurvations similar to those of the guitar; therefore, without corner blocks, the outline of the upper lobe forms a wavy shoulder reminiscent of the viols but more ornate and fanciful. The peg-box sometimes terminates in a fancy head instead of a scroll. The philomel, never used in the orchestra, is considered by some the instrument of the dilettanti, frequently played in Germany with the bowed zither. The tuning of the philomel is the same as for the violin; the timbre is shrill and crystal-like.

There is also an alto philomel corresponding to the viola. The bowed melodion is similar to the philomel, and has four steel strings of the same tuning as the violin, but arranged in inverse order; instead of being held like the violin and philomel, under the chin, it is placed on the knees of the performer, so that a hook under the fingerboard rests against the table.

Philomel is also another name for the nightingale, which perhaps is where the instrument gets its name.
