= Wood scraper block =

Percussion instrument

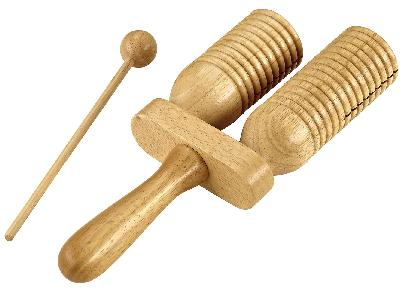
Wood scraper block

A wood scraper block, also known as wooden agogo or tone wood block, is an idiophone percussion instrument. It consists, usually, in a pair of small tubes made of wood, each one of different size, producing different tones. These tubes are played with a stick and have a ribbed surface to double as scraper. Originally proposed by Matin Cohen from Latin Percussion, imitating a Brazilian agogô and Latin güiro, this instrument is also manufactured with a single block or with three blocks.

== See also ==
- Temple block
- Wood block
- Jam block
