= Triccaballacca =

Italian folk music percussion instrument

The triccaballacca is a percussion instrument used in Neapolitan folk music and, generally speaking, in folk music throughout much of southern Italy. Technically, it is a "clapper" and consists of three percussive mallets mounted on a base, the outer two of which are hinged at the base and are moved in to strike the central piece, which is fixed; a rhythmic sound is produced by the clicking of wood on wood and the simultaneous sound of the small metal disks—called "jingles"—mounted on the instrument. The instrument comes in different sizes, the most common of which is about a foot-and-a-half high, small enough to be cradled in the arms easily.
