= AlphaSphere (instrument) =

Electronic musical instrument

The AlphaSphere is a MIDI controller designed by the Bristol-based company Nu Desine. The device consists of a spherical shell with pressure-sensitive pads on its surface which can be used to control third-party DAWs through the open source AlphaLive software.

Early versions of the AlphaSphere were shown at the NAMM Show, Musikmesse Frankfurt, three TEDx conferences, and the Future Everything Festival. The device received press from Sound on Sound, BBC, Wired and MusicRadar.

== Development ==
Adam Place (Founder of Nu Desine) produced the initial concept and prototype for the AlphaSphere while studying at Nagoya University of Arts in Japan. In September 2010, Place was commissioned by Media Sandbox (a development funding scheme within iShed, a former subsidiary of Bristol's Watershed) to research smart materials and develop the AlphaSphere. Place formed the company Nu Desine, hiring engineers, designers and software developers to facilitate the production of the AlphaSphere.

In April 2012, Nu Desine began taking pre-orders for a limited edition series of AlphaSpheres. The first batch was shipped in March 2013. Later in 2013, the standard version of the AlphaSphere was made available in music stores in the U.S. and Japan and on the AlphaSphere website in Europe.
