= Khmuoh =

Type of flat-faced gong

The khmuoh (Khmer: នឹងឃ្មោះ) is a Cambodian flat-faced gong, a percussion instrument beaten with a wooden mallet called "Onlung Kbal Sva". The gong may also be beaten with fists. It is used in the Bassac theater for sound affects or to accompany. It is also used for wedding processions, when the bridegroom goes to the bride's house.

The gong is round and flat-faced, made of a copper-brass alloy. It has a hole on the edge, through which a string is tied to make a handle. It is held with one hand and beaten with the mallet. Hitting the gong on the edge produces a different tone (sharp, metallic) than hitting it on the face (softer and more sustained.)
