= Tube trumpet =

Type of non-traditional natural trumpet

Homemade tube trumpets are natural trumpets constructed out of a length of hose pipe fitted with a kitchen funnel. They are used as teaching aids, and by bands such as the Bonzo Dog Doo Dah Band and Low Profile.

== Construction ==
As with the natural trumpet and bugle, the tube trumpet is a simple (valveless) brass instrument, and is therefore in principle limited to a single harmonic sequence, though by employing embouchure it can be made to produce a chromatic scale in the higher registers.

It can be constructed in any desired key depending on the length of tubing used; and a working tube trumpet can be retuned to a sharper pitch by trimming the hose. Once shortened it cannot be returned to its original or a flatter pitch.

== Teaching aid ==
By using a three foot length of garden hose and taping on a plastic funnel the principles of sound vibration can be demonstrated to music students.

== Bonzo Dog Doo Dah Band ==
Unlike any other brass instrument, the tube trumpet is flexible, allowing the bell to be swung around the player's head. This gives it the unique ability to bend notes via the Doppler effect. This effect was demonstrated to good effect in an early hit of the Bonzo Dog Doo Dah Band, I'm the Urban Spaceman, which was reprised during their reunion tour.

== Low Profile ==
Low Profile were a New Zealand alternative rock band of the 1980s who released two albums - Quiet Streets (1982) and Elephunkin' (1987), but are best remembered for their quirky single Elephunk In My Soup, which included the use of a hosepipe trumpet they termed an Elephunk.

== Hosaphone ==
A hosaphone is one such homemade trumpet, which was used to compose a Codetta in C for Hosaphone, Piano & Bass.

A typical tube trumpet was made by Uncle Phil in the comic strip For Better or For Worse, which he termed a "hose-a-phonium".

Prince of Denmark's March (hosaphone)
Demonstration of hosaphone: Prince of Denmark's March
