= Byzaanchy =

Musical instrument

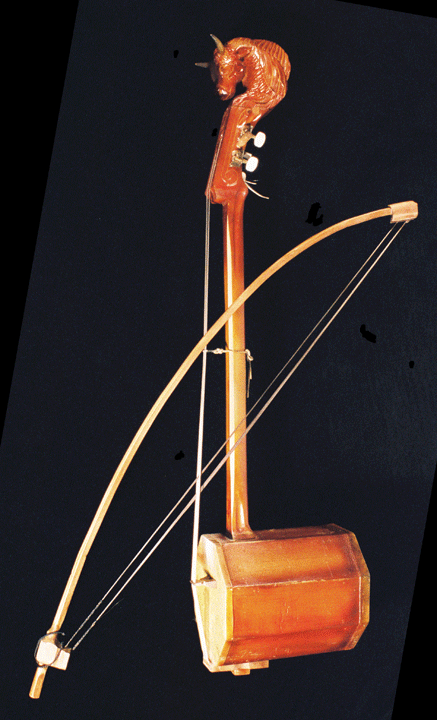
- Classification: Bowed string instrument

Related instruments
- Sihu; Erhu; Igil; Shichepshin

The byzaanchy (Tuvan: бызаанчы; Russian: Бизанчи; also transliterated byzanchi or byzanchie) is a four-stringed vertical spike fiddle used in the traditional music of Tuva. It is similar to the Chinese sihu. However, the byzaanchy's soundbox is generally made of wood whereas the sihu usually has a metal soundbox. The byzaanchy's soundbox may be cylindrical, cubical, hexagonical or octagonical.

The word byzaanchy comes from the Tuvan word for calf, "бызаа".

The instrument's four strings are tuned to two notes a fifth apart. The first and third strings are tuned to the same note and the second and fourth strings are tuned a fifth higher. The bow is made of horsehair and has two strands which are weaved in between the strings. The first strand is between the first and second string and the second between the third and fourth. The instrument is played by bowing the strings and pressing them from the back with the fingers instead of being pressed against the neck. The headstock of the instrument is often decorated with a horse or bull head.

== See also ==
- Music of Tuva
- Sihu
