= Tetzilacatl =

Musical instrument

The tetzilacatl was a Mexica percussion instrument. This vibrator or resonator, was a tray of copper suspended by a cord, which was struck with sticks or with the hand. It appears to have been principally confined to the sacred music in the temples.
