= Tamalin =

A tamalin is a type of drum.
