= Đàn tre =

String instrument

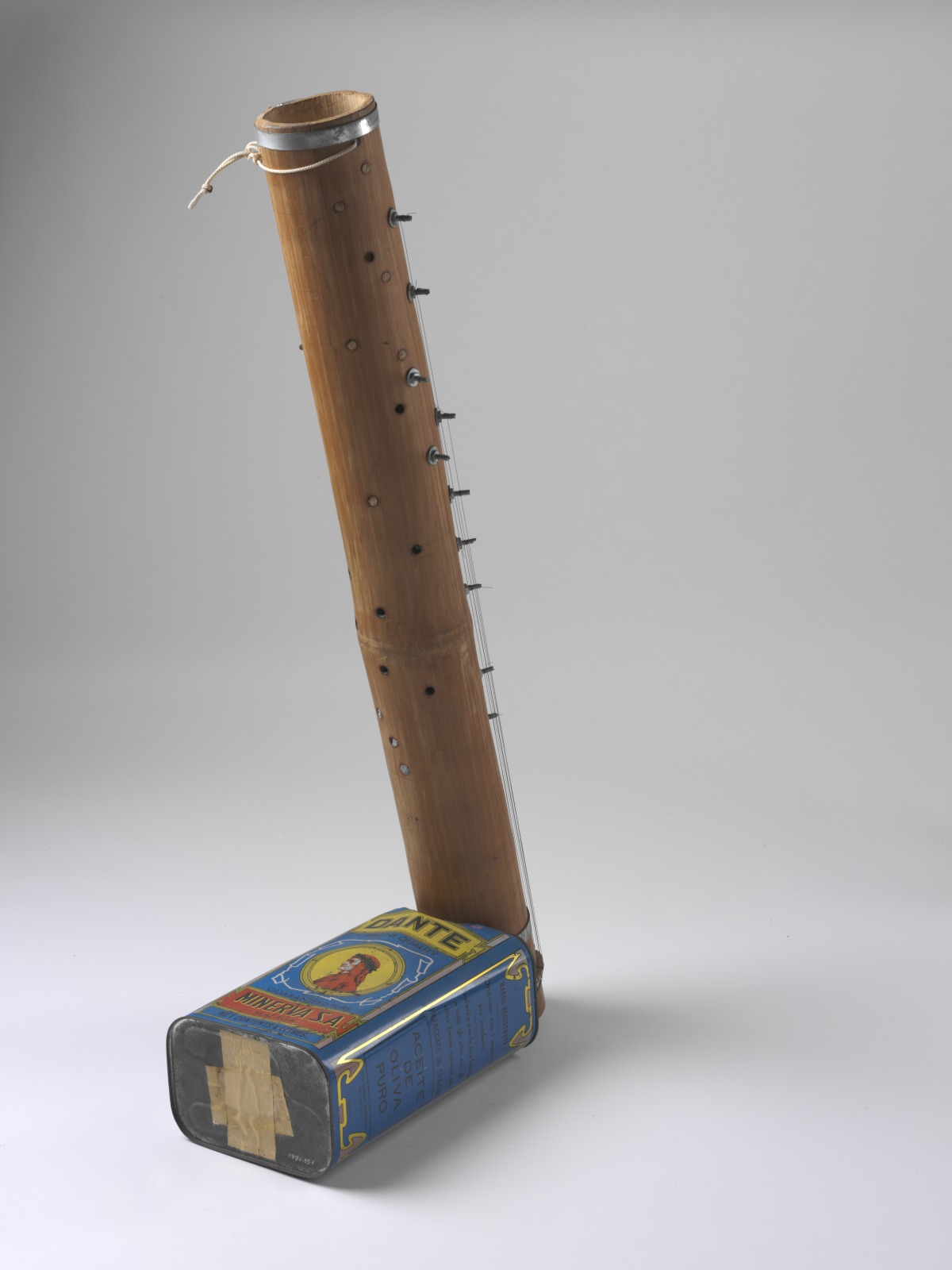
- The đàn tre held by the National Museum of Australia

String instrument
- Classification: Chordophone; tube zither
- Hornbostel–Sachs classification: 312.122 (Heterochord tube zither with extra resonator)
- Inventor(s): Minh Tam Nguyen
- Developed: 20th century

Related instruments
- đàn tranh

The đàn tre is a handmade string instrument created by Minh Tam Nguyen, a Vietnamese refugee. Only two examples of the instrument currently exist, with the location of one being unknown.

== Background ==
Minh Tam Nguyen (born 25 November 1947 in Binh Dinh Province, Vietnam) began playing guitar at 13. He became a priest in the Redemptorist Order, but left to teach music in schools. After the outbreak of the Vietnam War, Nguyen became a lieutenant in the Army of the Republic of Vietnam in 1968. After being captured by Viet Cong forces during conflict in the Phubon jungle on 20 March 1975, he was sent to a series of labour camps.

== Origin ==
In 1976, Nguyen created his first đàn tre during his time interned in the re-education camp in Pleiku Province, Central Vietnam. Created from recycled materials, he used it to teach another prisoner how to play music. After being released from the camp in 1981, Nguyen sought refuge in the Philippines with his son, leaving his first prototype behind. In 1981, Nguyen created another đàn tre during his time at a refugee camp on Palawan Island.

== Design ==
The đàn tre (Vietnamese: "bamboo string instrument") is a stringed instrument, inspired by the guitar and the zither. Throughout Nguyen's journey, the instrument was continuously expanded and improved. The đàn tre consists of two parts: a bamboo tube which its 23 strings are pegged on and an amplification box made from a four-litre Dante olive oil can. The strings are guitar strings and are 80 cm long. Strings are connected to the bamboo tube by steel tuning keys. The instrument is secured using various hose clamps. There are sound holes at the base of the đàn tre.

The đàn tre is in the key of C.

== Usage ==
The đàn tre was used by Nguyen as a way to combat loneliness and to keep a connection to his homeland. After being separated from his family and emigrating to Australia, he played the instrument in public for performances, such as at a conference of the Ethnic Communities Council of Queensland in 1984.

Nguyen's đàn tre was loaned to the National Museum of Australia for an exhibition. Nguyen later donated his đàn tre to the museum in 1990 after being reunited with his family.

== Legacy ==
In 2019, the đàn tre was picked to be one of the subjects of the Grigoryan Brothers' suite of music: This is Us: A Musical Reflection of Australia. Commissioned for the 20th anniversary of the museum, the piece is inspired by Vietnamese folk music. It was one of 18 objects from the museum collections to be chosen.

Nguyen is currently in the process of creating a third đàn tre using different materials. Unlike the original or second versions, his new design uses a plastic pipe instead of bamboo and forgoes the olive oil can for a wooden box.
