= Skor yeam =

Cambodian bass drum

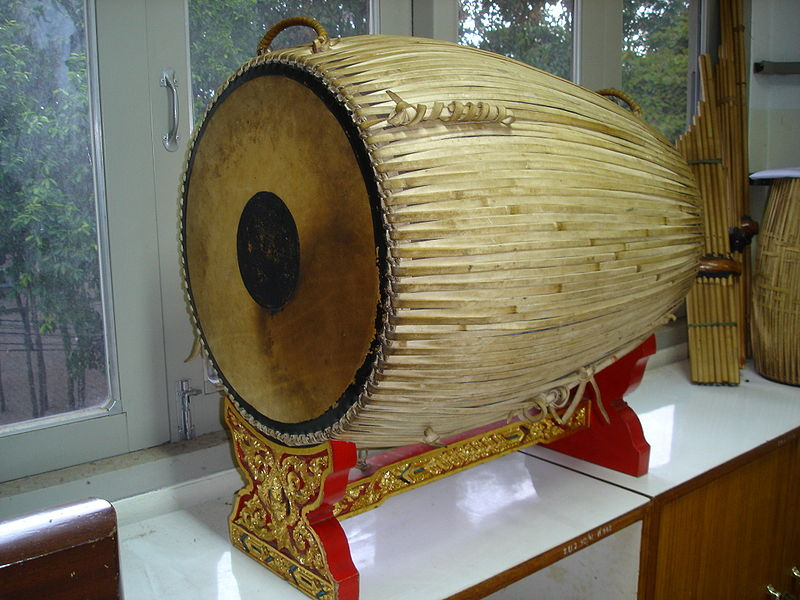
Thai taphon mon drum, very similar to the skor yeam.

The skor yeam (guard drum) also known as the skor pheary, skor chey (successful drum) and skor torb (soldier drum) is a Cambodian bass drum, similar in shape to the skor samphor, but much larger. The drums are ancient in origin, used originally in war to "beat command signals" or gather soldiers together. In temples they are used to call Buddhists together or announce ceremonies. Where the samphor is hand-played, the skor yeam is played with a drumstick. The instrument is similar in size and shape to the Thai taphon mon.

As the "skor yeam" the drum was played in Cambodian "Tom Ming" music, played at funerals. As the skor pheary or skor peiry, the instrument was used in monasteries, much as the bells in Catholic monasteries, signaling times for prayer and religious services.

== See also ==
- Music of Cambodia
