= Violinzither =

Bowed zither

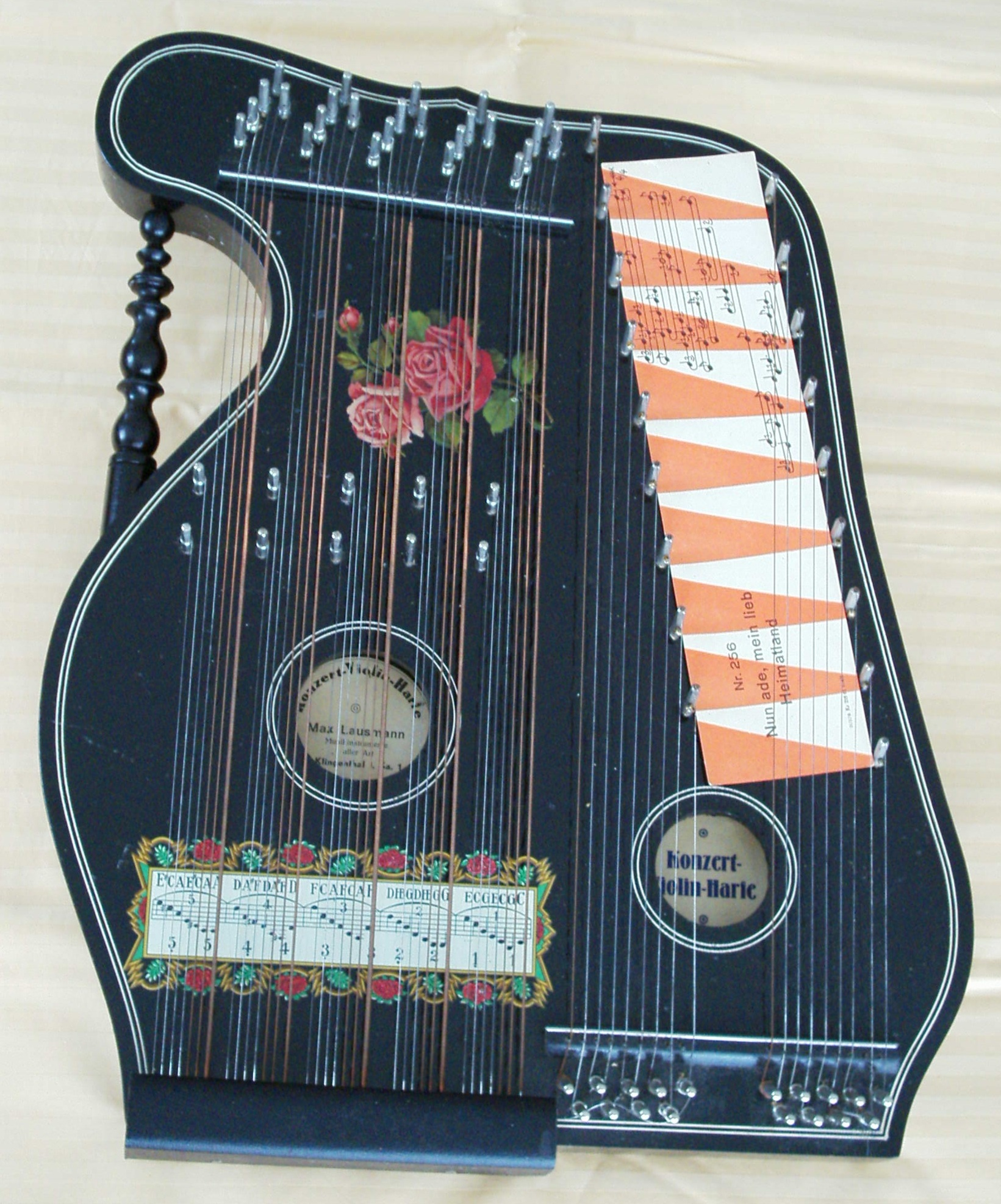
- Violinzither with five sets of accompanying strings

String instrument
- Other names: Violinharp
- Hornbostel–Sachs classification: 314.122–71 (Box zither sounded by a bow)
- Inventor: Clemens Neuber
- Developed: 1925

Related instruments
- Ukelin

The violinzither or violinharp is a German bowed string instrument of the zither family invented in 1925. It is a cross between the fretless chord zither and a concert zither.

== Characteristics ==
The violinzither normally has eighteen melodic strings arranged in two vertical rows, with the scale alternating between rows. It has a diatonic tuning in C major, with a range of two and a half octaves, from c' to f'' (C4 to F5). Some models were also created with chromatic or semi-chromatic tunings, with five or six sets of strings serving as an accompaniment, which are plucked with the left hand. A violin bow (about 55cm long) held by the right hand is used to play the melodic strings.

== History ==
The violinzither was invented in 1925 by Clemens Neuber in Klingenthal, Germany. A variant of the violinzither, the concert violinharp, was created by Max Lausmann. Many violinzithers were sold under the name "Kalliope" by the company C. A. Wunderlich. Violinzithers have been manufactured by the luthier C. Robert Hopf since the 1920s.

== See also ==
- Bowed psaltery
