= Binzasara =

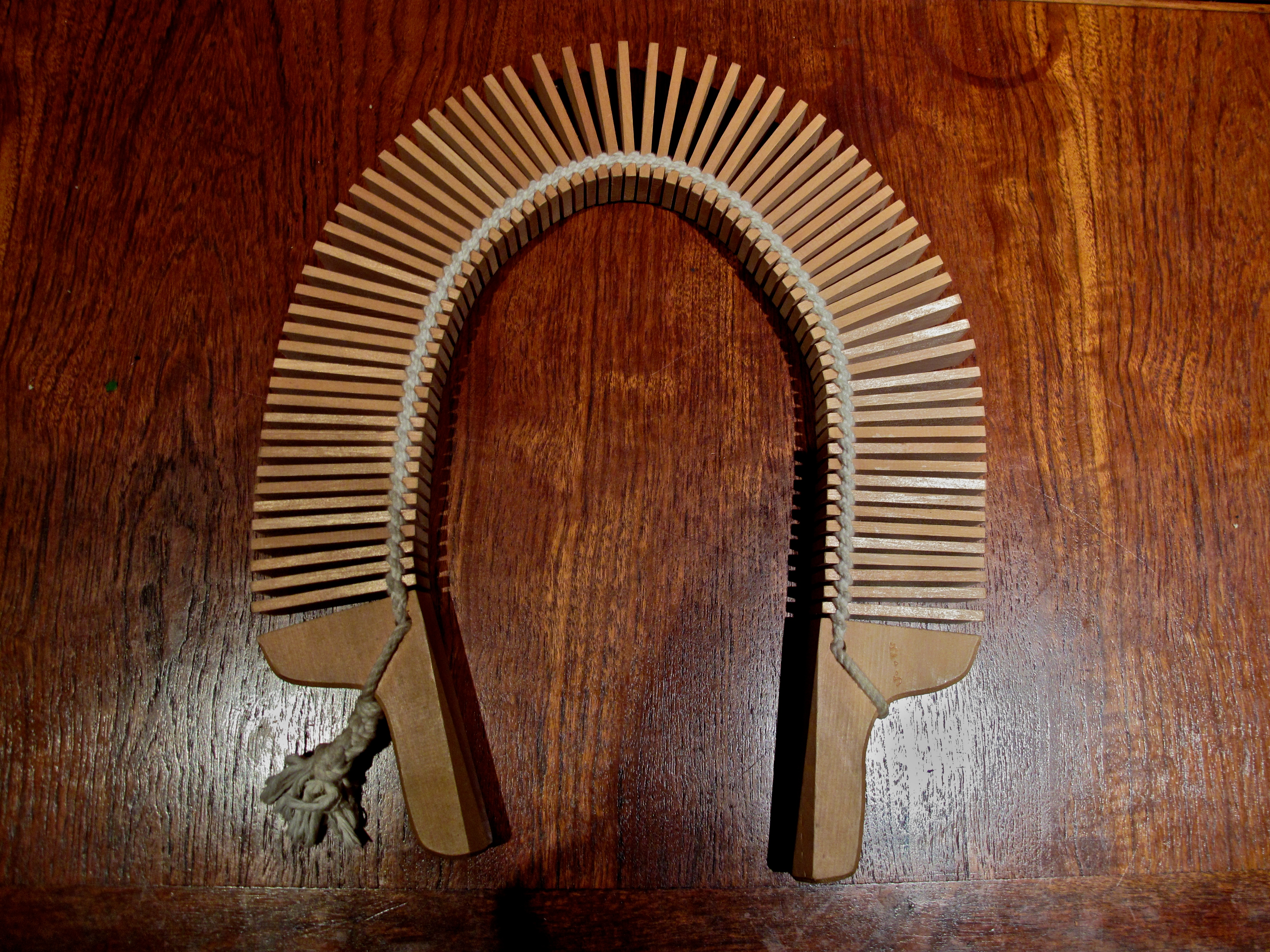
A binzasara

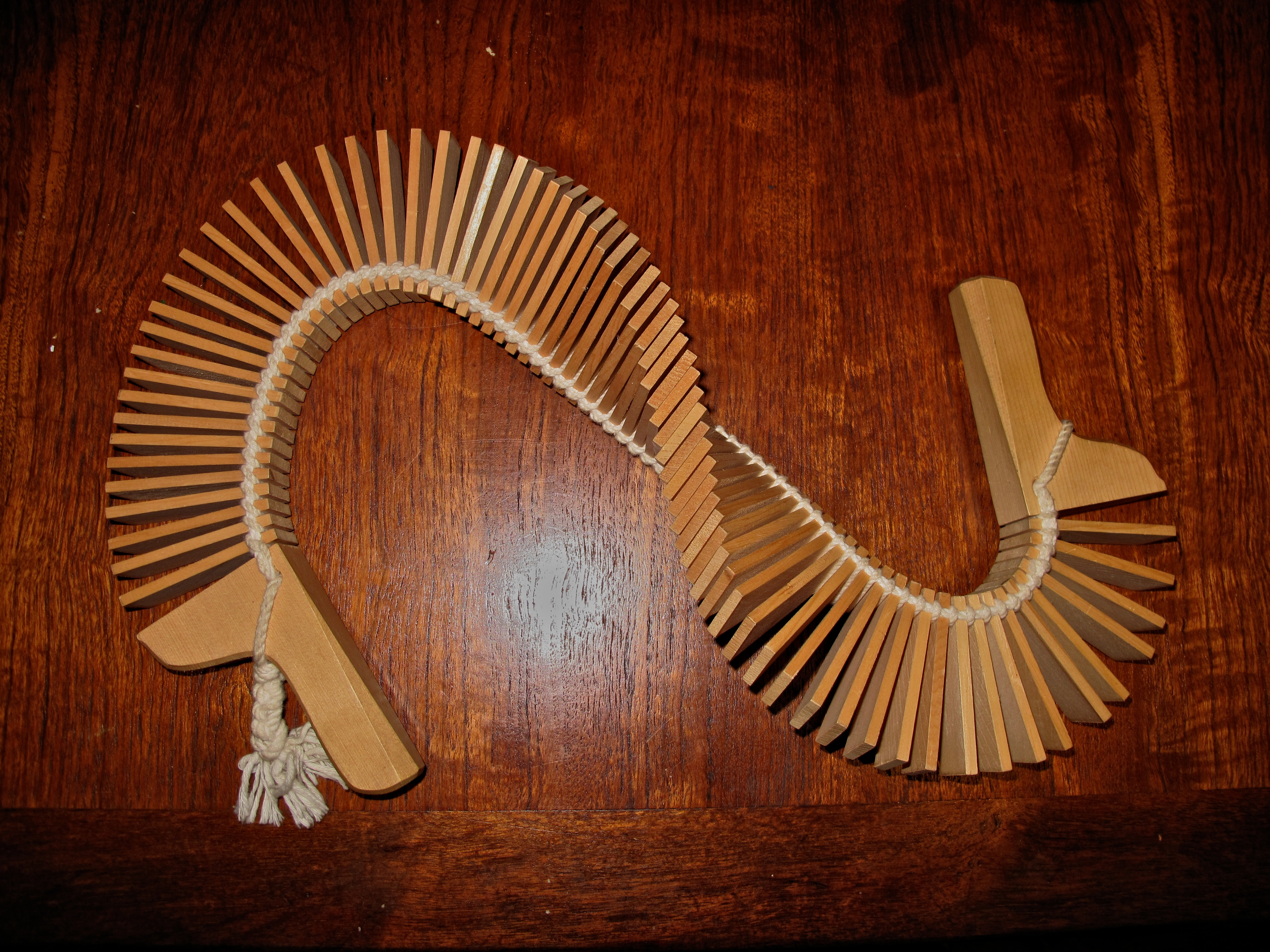

Binzasara (編木 or 板ざさら) is a traditional Japanese percussion instrument used in folk songs, and rural dances. It was originally used as a cleaning tool. The instrument is made up of several wooden plates strung together with a cotton cord, with handles at both ends. Typically, a binzasara will have 108 wooden slats which is a significant number in Buddhism. The stack of wooden plates is played by making them move like a wave.
