= Kemane of Cappadocia =

Large lyre of the Cappadocian Greeks

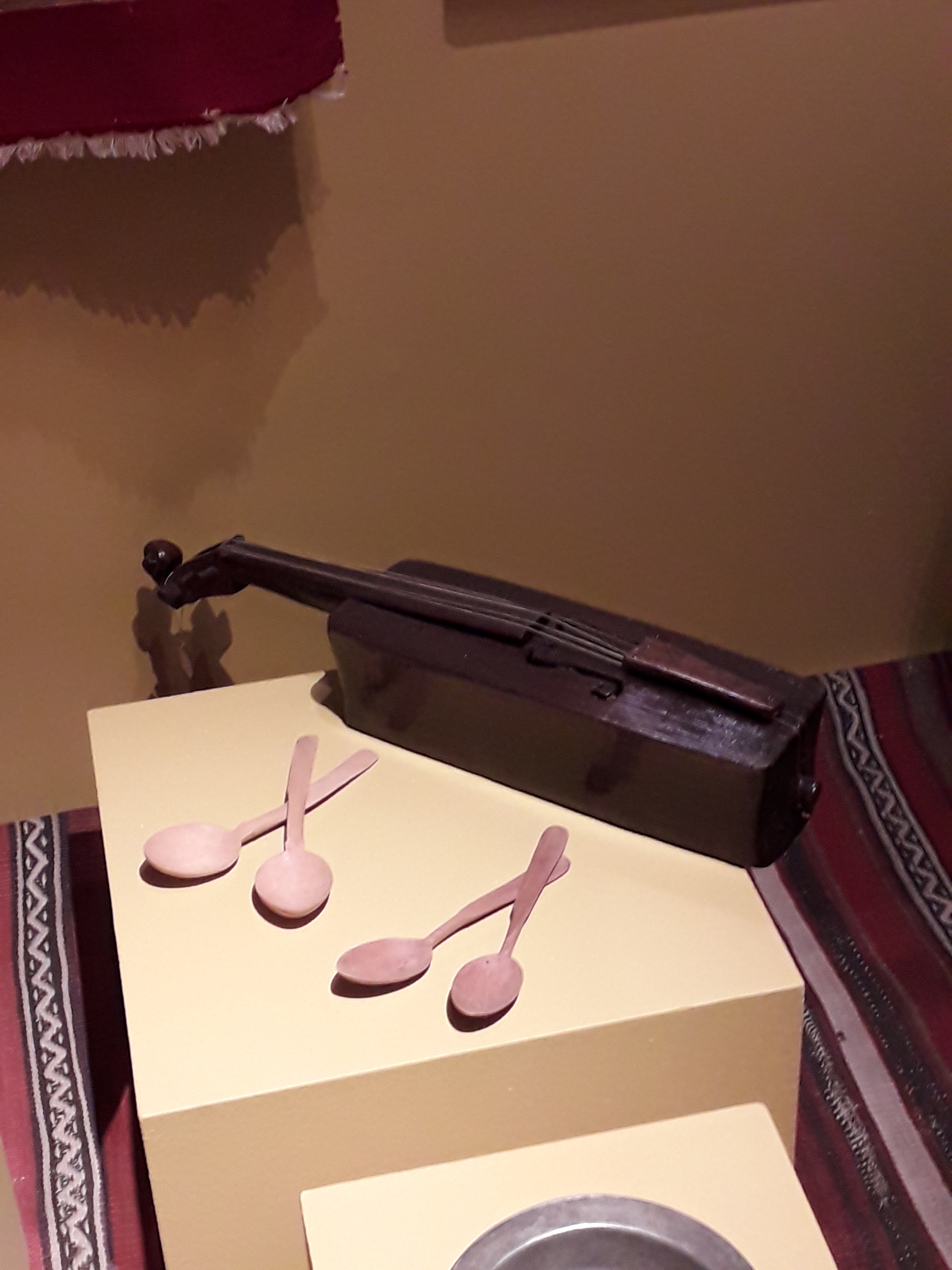
- Kemane from Pharasa
- Classification: Composite chordophone: 321.322.71 (Box lute played with a bow)

Musicians
- Giorgos Polyntzaklis

Kemane of Cappadocia or Cappadocian lyra is named a large lyre of the Cappadocian Greeks, in Anatolia.

It has six main strings, as well as six sympathetics. It has been evolved from the Byzantine lyra.

== Characteristics ==
The Kemane has six main strings tuned in fifths or fourths, as well as six sympathetic strings (strung in parallel with the other strings and not on their own, improving the sound of the instrument). They are either on the same pitch, or an octave higher than the main strings. Kemane means violin in Turkish. It has a bottle-shaped body, short neck or "μάνικο" (maniko, lit. sleeve), a fingerboard, similar to the Pontic Lyra or the Black Sea Kemence, but the pegbox, also known as "καράβολο" (karavolo) is the same as the violin and the pegs are placed sideways. It has two sticks on the insides, functioning as soundposts, named "ψυχές". (lit. souls) The sympathetic strings are placed underneath the fingerboard, pass from holes inside the bridge and tied underneath the tailpiece. It is played like the Kemence, on the virtuoso's leg. Notes are played using the finger on the top on the string, instead of the nail on the string's side, as it does on pear-shaped lyras. Like all lyras of the Eastern Mediterranean, it is based on the byzantine lyra.

=== Construction ===
The construction is similar to the other lyras, often with the same materials, the wood for the body, neck and pegbox is hard and single-piece, (eg mulberry), while the soundboard uses soft types of wood (eg fir or Lebanese cedar) . The bow or "τοξάριον" (toxarion) used to be curved, like an arch, with hair made out of male horse tail, while nowadays the violin bow is also used.

== See also ==
- Kemenche
