= Sihu (instrument) =

Chinese stringed musical instrument

- A sihu, without its bow

String instrument
- Classification: Chordophone: Bowed string instrument
- Hornbostel–Sachs classification: 321.313-71 (Spike tube lutes)

Related instruments
- Huqin (China); Khuuchir (Mongolia)

The sihu (Chinese: 四胡; pinyin: sìhú), or argil khuuchir in Mongolia, (Note: Mongolian: ᠠᠷᠭᠢᠯ ᠬᠣᠭᠣᠴᠢᠷ; аргил хуучир; argil khuuchir, where the term khuuchir defines the whole huqin family) is a Chinese bowed string instrument with four strings. It is a member of the huqin family of instruments.

== Construction ==
The instrument's name comes from the words sì (四; "four"), referring to the instrument's number of strings, and hú (胡), short for huqin, the family of instruments of which the sihu is a member. Its sound box and neck are made from hardwood, and the playing end of the sound box is covered with python, cow or sheep skin.

There are several sizes of sihu; the lowest of these is generally tuned C, C, G, G; the medium size is tuned G, G, D, D; and the smallest size is tuned D, D, A, A.

== Technique ==
The instrument is held vertically, with its sound box on the player's lap, and its strings are tuned in pairs. The bow, usually made of horsetail hair, is grouped into two strands to enable both pairs of strings to sound at the same time.

== Use ==
The sihu is primarily associated with Mongolian culture, played in Mongolia and also in the Inner Mongolia Autonomous Region of China. In Mongolian, it is known as the argil khuuchir. It is also used as a traditional instrument in the Liaoning, Jilin and Heilongjiang provinces of China.

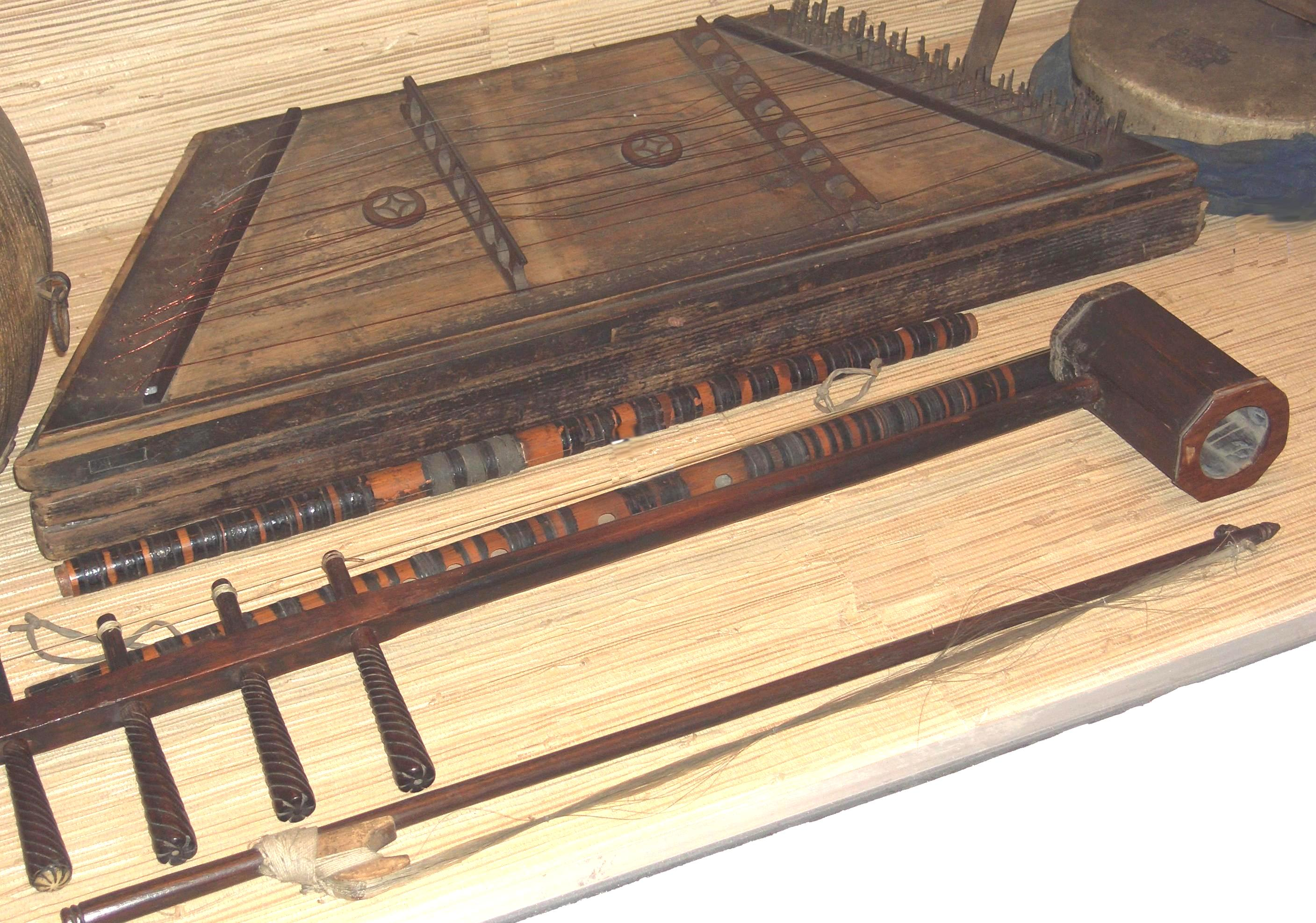
A yangqin (top) and sihu, with bow, used in Chinese shadow play, Qing dynasty

It is also used as an accompanying instrument in various Chinese narrative genres, including Beijing dagu, plum-blossom dagu, Xihe Dagu, Tianjin new tunes, Shandong qin shu, Northeast dagu, Hubei song, Shaoxing lianhua luo, Shanxi er ren, Inner Mongolia er ren, northeast dance duet, lucky play, Beijing opera (derived drama from ballads), Hebei pi ying (shadow theater), and Henan erjiaxian (traditional entertainment involving talking, singing and drama).

The sihu, sometimes formerly called the tiqin (a separate but similar instrument), was the premier folk instrument of the Qing dynasty, used in both folk and court ensembles by Han, Mongol and Manchu musicians, until Liu Tianhua brought the erhu to Beijing in the 1920s. Since then, the sihu has mostly fallen into obscurity, even among Mongols.

Similar instruments include the Mongolian dörvön chikhtei khuur ("four eared fiddle") and the Tuvan byzaanchy. In China, dörvön chikhtei khuur (Chinese: 胡兀尔; 都日奔齐和胡尔) is considered another name of the sihu.

== See also ==
- Huqin
- Erhu
- Byzaanchy
- List of Chinese musical instruments
