= Kong nyee =

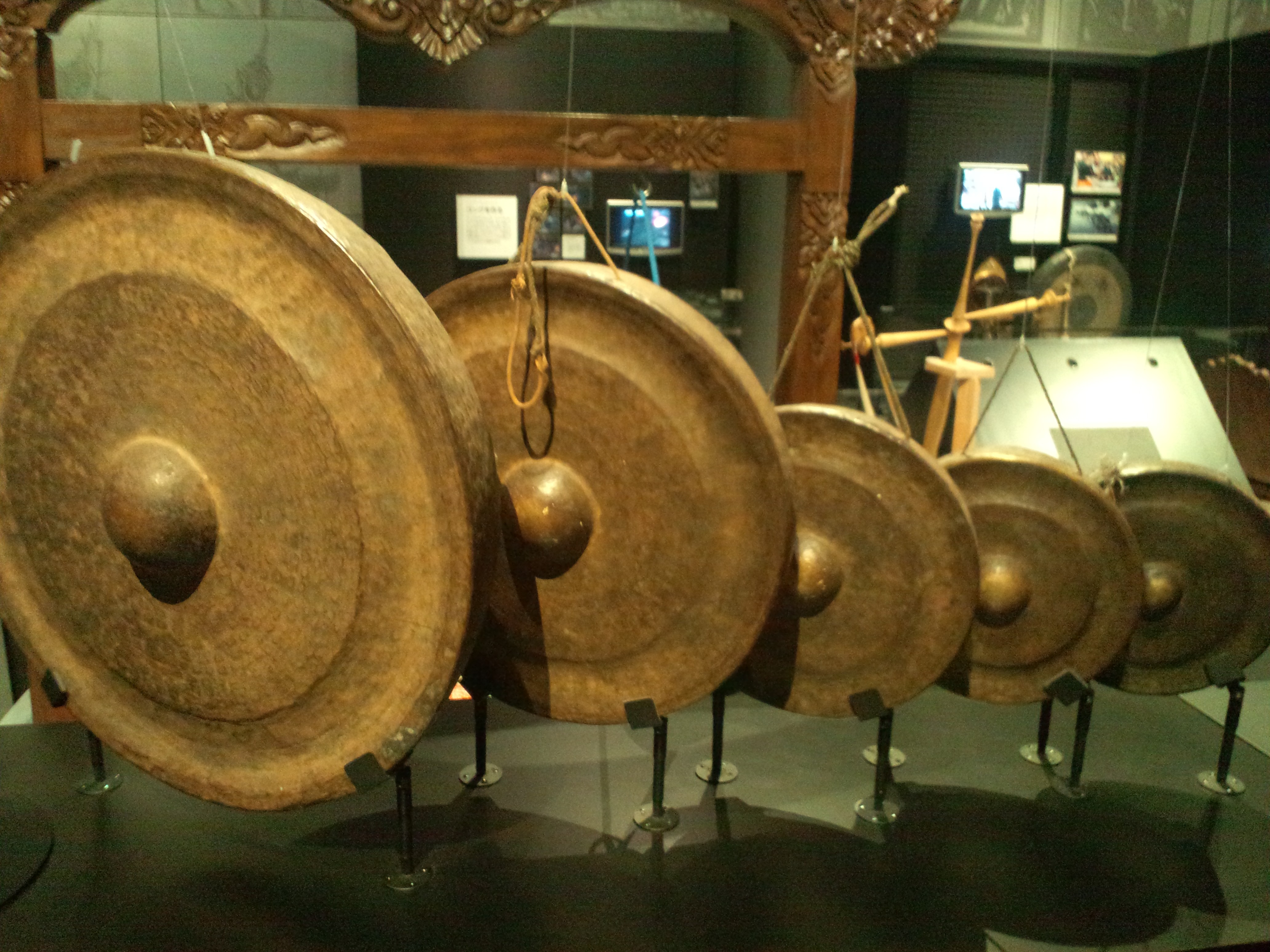
Nipple gongs of the Kreung people of the Cambodian highlands. Possibly kong nyee, which are nipple gongs in varying sizes, played together.

The kong nyee (គងញី literally feminine gong) is a bossed gong from Ratanakiri province in northeastern Cambodia. The instruments vary in size, for different pitches.

The instrument is a round bronze-brass alloy plate with a round lump in the center, called a boss (like a shield boss) in English. The Khmer word translates to "breast". Musicians strike the boss with a mallet to get the best sound from the gong. The "male gong", kong chmol, lacks the boss in the center.
