= Kong chmol =

The kong chmol (គងឈ្មោល, literally male gong) is a Cambodian flat-faced gong, with different sizes and pitches, played in an ensemble, with players each playing one gong and responsible for one pitch, memorizing the music to play their pitch at appropriate times. Compared to the "feminine gong", kong nyee, the kong chmol is plain, lacking that gong's rounded center, called a "breast."

The instruments are most common in the Ratanakiri and Mondulkiri provinces of Cambodia, near the borders of Laos and Thailand. They are played by "highland tribes" there.

The instrument is a round, flatfaced bronze plate. Two holes are drilled in the edge to string rope through and make a handle or shoulder strap. The instrument is hit with a wooden or bamboo beater, called an "Onlung kbal sva." The instrument can also be hit with the fist. When holding the instrument instead of using the strap, the hand that holds it can be used to deaden or silence the instrument.
