= Saratovskaya garmonika =

Musical instrument

The Saratovskaya garmonika, named after the Russian city of Saratov, is a colorful variant on the standard one row push–pull diatonic button accordion. The chief distinguishing characteristic of this little folk accordion is that it plays the tonic scale (and major chord) on the bellows draw and the dominant on the bellows press, the reverse of a standard diatonic box.

Another curious feature is the addition of two bells on the top of the instrument which are struck with tiny metal hammers attached to the bass and chord buttons for rhythmic accompaniment. They add a fun accent on dance tunes. It is possible to play the basses very lightly and avoid activating the bells, as they become rather tiresome after a while. The basses also have an additional tonic chord button in the center, lighter in tone than the regular chord, which is not attached to the hammers.

== Sources ==
- Мирек А.М. (1967). Из истории аккордеона и баяна. М.: Музыка. p. 195.
- Мирек А.М. (1968). "Саратовская гармоника". Справочник по гармоникам. М.: Музыка. p. 131.
- Мирек А.М. (1979). "Саратовская гармоника". …И звучит гармоника. М.: Советский композитор. p. 176.
- Мирек А.М. (1992). Справочник к схеме гармоник. М.: Альфред Мирек. p. 60.
- Самохин А.Н. Саратовская гармоника: традиции исполнительства и подготовка кадров // Актуальные проблемы музыкальной педагогики. Сборник научных трудов (по материалам Международной научно-практической конференции «Актуальные проблемы музыкальной педагогики», 29 марта 2017 г.). Выпуск VIII. – Саратов: Издательский центр «Наука», 2017. – 296 с. С. 236-241.
- Самохин А.Н. Саратовская гармоника: история исполнительства на инструменте и подготовка кадров // Памятники истории, культуры и архитектуры г. Саратова: материалы VI городской научно-практической конференции (Саратов, 14 апреля 2017 г.) / под ред. Д.А. Андреева, А.А. Конопленко. Саратов: ИЦ «Наука», МУК «Культурный центр имени П.А. Столыпина»», 2017. – 250 с. С. 72-81.
- Самохин А.Н. Народный инструмент саратовская гармоника в традиционной музыкально-инструментальной культуре России // Филология, искусствоведение, культурология: проблемы и решения: материалы международной заочной научно-практической конференции (10 октября 2011 г.) – Новосибирск: Изд. «Априори», 2011. -124с. С. 25-29.
- Самохин А.Н. Саратовская певунья // Аккорд. 2008. №3. С. 56-60.
