= Tamborita calentana =

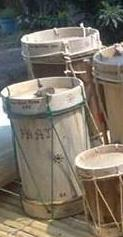
Tamboritas calentanas

The tamborita or tamborita calentana is a percussion instrument from Mexico. It is used in conjuntos de música calentana, in the states of Guerrero, Michoacán and Estado de México.

It is a double-headed skin drum, traditionally built with Parota root wood. Rims are made of aisinchete shrub and are tightened as in military drums. It is performed with a pair of wood sticks, one of these with a skin covered head to soften the sound. Tamborita accompanies guitars and violins in sones and gustos of tierracalenteña music.
