= Harmonica =

Free reed wind musical instrument

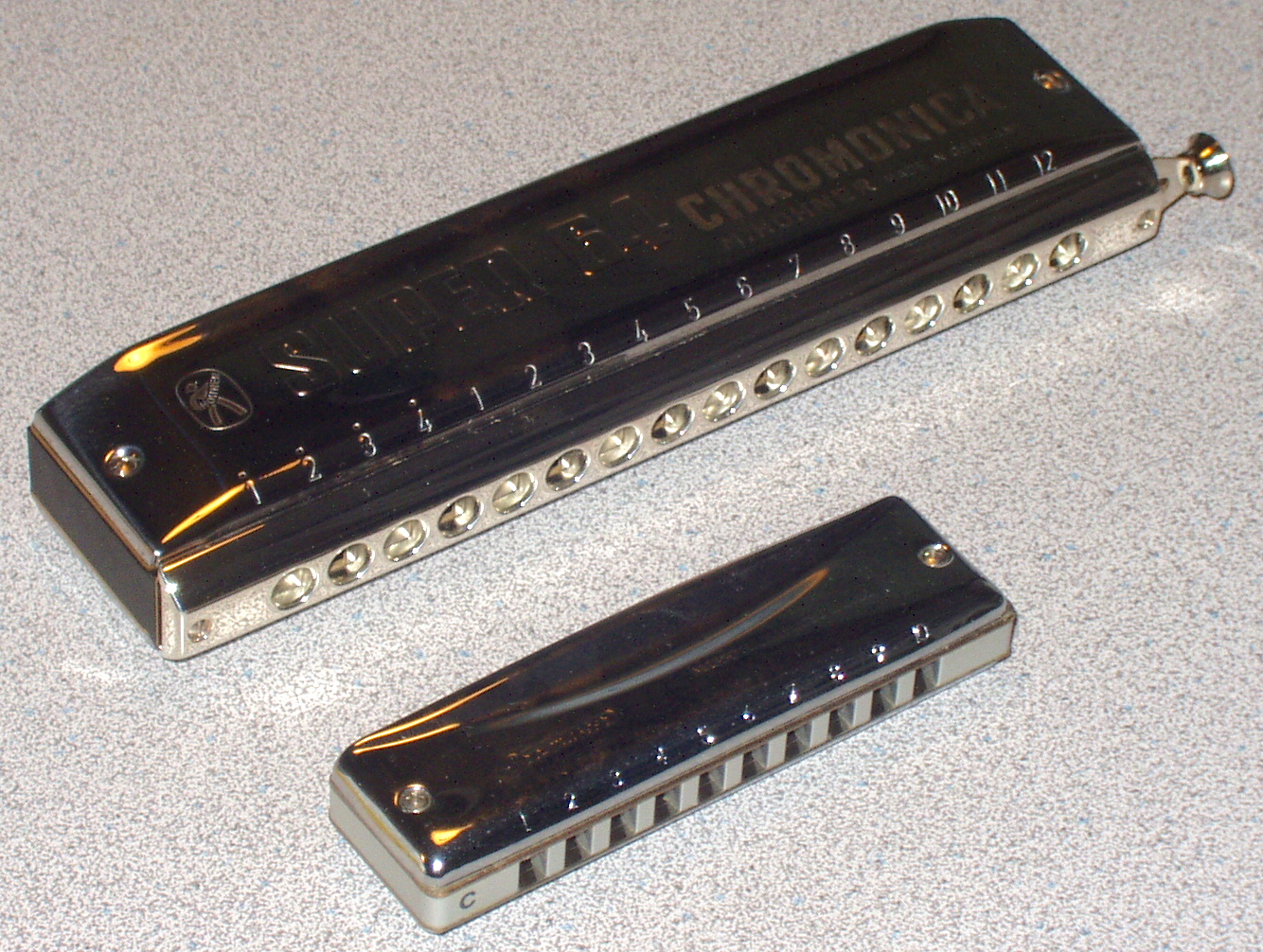
- A 16-hole chromatic (top) and 10-hole diatonic harmonica (bottom)

Woodwind instrument
- Other names: French harp; mouth organ; blues harp
- Classification: Wind; aerophone
- Hornbostel–Sachs classification: 412.132 (Free reed aerophone)
- Developed: c. 1820s

Playing range
- Slightly over 4 octaves (16-hole chromatic model); 3 octaves (10-hole diatonic model)

Related instruments
- Melodeon; melodica; yu; harmonetta

Musicians
- List of harmonicists

More articles or information
- Chromatic harmonica; Richter-tuned harmonica; tremolo harmonica

The harmonica, also known as a French harp or mouth organ, is a free reed wind instrument used worldwide in many musical genres, notably in blues, American folk music, classical music, jazz, country, and rock. The many types of harmonica include diatonic, chromatic, tremolo, octave, orchestral, and bass versions. The harmonica is played by using the lips and tongue to direct air into or out of one (or more) holes along a mouthpiece (which covers one edge of the harmonica for most of its length). Behind each hole is a chamber containing at least one reed. The most common type of harmonica is a diatonic Richter-tuned instrument with ten air passages and twenty reeds, often called a blues harp. The harmonica reed is a flat, elongated spring typically made of brass, stainless steel, or bronze, which is secured at one end over a slot that serves as an airway. When the free end is made to vibrate by the player's air, the reed alternately blocks and unblocks the airway to produce sound.

Reeds are tuned to individual pitches. Tuning may involve changing a reed's length, how heavy it is near its free end, or how stiff it is near its fixed end. Reeds that are longer, heavier, or more flexible produce lower pitches; shorter, lighter, or stiffer reeds produce higher pitches. If, as on most modern harmonicas, a reed is affixed above or below its slot rather than in the plane of the slot, it responds more easily to air flowing in the direction that initially would push it into the slot, i.e., as a closing reed. This difference in response to air direction makes it possible to include both a blow reed and a draw reed in the same air chamber, and to play them separately without relying on flaps of plastic or leather (valves, wind-savers) to block the nonplaying reed.

An important technique in performance is bending, causing a drop in pitch by making embouchure adjustments. Bending the pitch of an isolated reed is possible on chromatic models (or any others that have wind-savers), but it is also possible to lower or raise (overbend, overblow, overdraw) the pitch produced by pairs of reeds in the same chamber, as on a diatonic or other unvalved harmonica. Such two-reed pitch changes actually involve sound production by the normally silent reed, the opening reed (for instance, the blow reed while the player is drawing).

== Parts ==
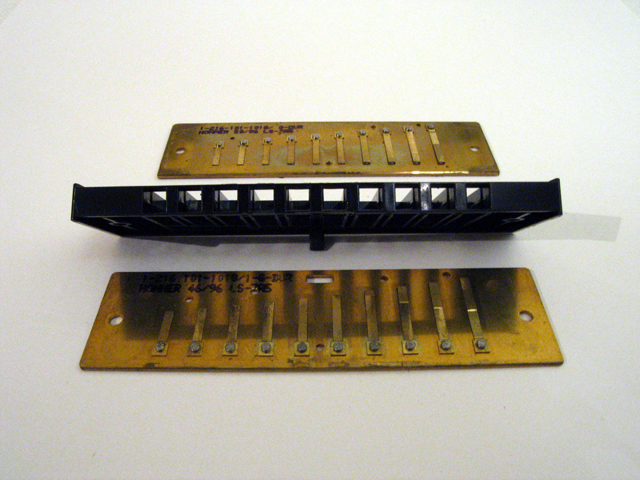
Comb and two reed plates

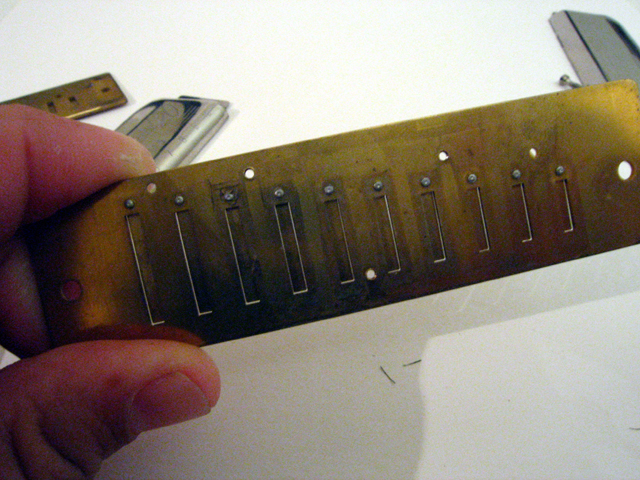
Reed plate

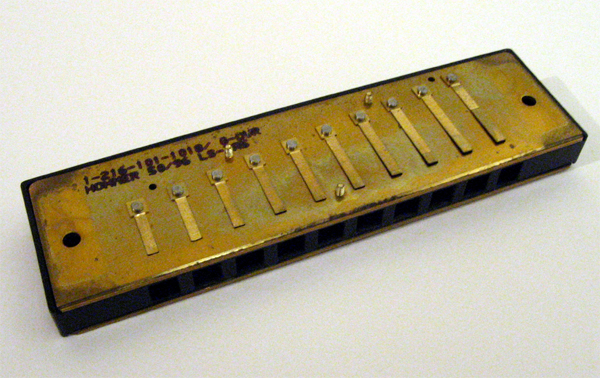
Reed plate mounted on the comb of a diatonic harmonica, one of several categories of harmonica

The basic parts of the harmonica are the comb, reed plates, and cover plates.

=== Comb ===
The comb is the main body of the instrument, which, when assembled with the reed plates, forms air chambers for the reeds. The term "comb" may originate from the similarity between this part of a harmonica and a hair comb. Harmonica combs were traditionally made from wood, but now are also made from plastic (ABS) or metal (including titanium for high-end instruments). Some modern and experimental comb designs are complex in the way that they direct the air.

Dispute exists among players about whether comb material affects the tone of a harmonica. Those saying no argue that unlike the soundboard of a piano or the top piece of a violin or guitar, a harmonica's comb is neither large enough nor able to vibrate freely enough to substantially augment or change the sound. Among those saying yes are those who are convinced by their ears. Few dispute that comb surface smoothness and air tightness when mated with the reed plates can greatly affect tone and playability. The main advantage of a particular comb material over another one is its durability. In particular, a wooden comb can absorb moisture from the player's breath and contact with the tongue. This can cause the comb to expand slightly, making the instrument uncomfortable to play, and to then contract, potentially compromising air tightness. Various types of wood and treatments have been devised to reduce the degree of this problem.

An even more serious problem with wooden combs, especially in chromatic harmonicas (with their thin dividers between chambers), is that, as the combs expand and shrink over time, cracks can form in the combs, because the comb is held immobile by nails, resulting in disabling leakage. Serious players devote significant effort to restoring wood combs and sealing leaks. Some players used to soak wooden-combed harmonicas (diatonics, without wind-savers) in water to cause a slight expansion, which they intended to make the seal between the comb, reed plates, and covers more airtight. Modern wooden-combed harmonicas are less prone to swelling and contracting, but modern players still dip their harmonicas in water for the way it affects tone and ease of bending notes.

=== Reed plate ===
The reed plate is a grouping of several reeds in a single housing. The reeds are usually made of brass, but steel, aluminium, and plastic are occasionally used. Individual reeds are usually riveted to the reed plate, but they may also be welded or screwed in place. Reeds fixed on the inner side of the reed plate (within the comb's air chamber) respond to blowing, while those fixed on the outer side respond to suction.

Most harmonicas are constructed with the reed plates screwed or bolted to the comb or each other. A few brands still use the traditional method of nailing the reed plates to the comb. Some experimental and rare harmonicas also have had the reed plates held in place by tension, such as the WWII-era all-American models. If the plates are bolted to the comb, the reed plates can be replaced individually. This is useful because the reeds eventually go out of tune through normal use, and certain notes of the scale can fail more quickly than others.

A notable exception to the traditional reed plate design is the all-plastic harmonicas designed by Finn Magnus in the 1950s, in which the reed and reed plate were molded out of a single piece of plastic. The Magnus design had the reeds, reed plates, and comb made of plastic and either molded or permanently glued together.

=== Cover plates ===
Cover plates cover the reed plates and are usually made of metal, though wood and plastic have also been used. The choice of these is personal; because they project sound, they determine the tonal quality of the harmonica. Two types of cover plates are used: traditional open designs of stamped metal or plastic, which are simply there to be held; and enclosed designs (such as the Hohner Meisterklasse and Super 64, Suzuki Promaster and SCX), which offer a louder tonal quality. From these two basic types, a few modern designs have been created, such as the Hohner CBH-2016 chromatic and the Suzuki Overdrive diatonic, which have complex covers that allow for specific functions not usually available in the traditional design. In the late 19th and early 20th centuries, harmonicas not uncommonly had special features on the covers, such as bells, which could be rung by pushing a button.

=== Wind-savers ===
Wind-savers are one-way valves made from thin strips of plastic, knit paper, leather, or Teflon glued to the reed plate. They are typically found in chromatic harmonicas, chord harmonicas, and many octave-tuned harmonicas. Wind-savers are used when two reeds share a cell and leakage through the nonplaying reed would be significant. For example, when a draw note is played, the valve on the blow reed-slot is sucked shut, preventing air from leaking through the inactive blow reed. An exception to this is the now-discontinued Hohner XB-40, on which valves are placed not to isolate single reeds, but rather to isolate entire chambers from being active, a design that made playing traditional blues bends possible on all reeds.

=== Mouthpiece ===
The mouthpiece is placed between the air chambers of the instrument and the player's mouth. This can be integral with the comb (the diatonic harmonicas; the Hohner Chrometta); part of the cover (as in Hohner's CX-12); or may be a separate unit, secured by screws, which is typical of chromatics. In many harmonicas, the mouthpiece is purely an ergonomic aid designed to make playing more comfortable. In the traditional slider-based chromatic harmonica, it is essential to the functioning of the instrument because it provides a groove for the slide.

=== Accessories ===
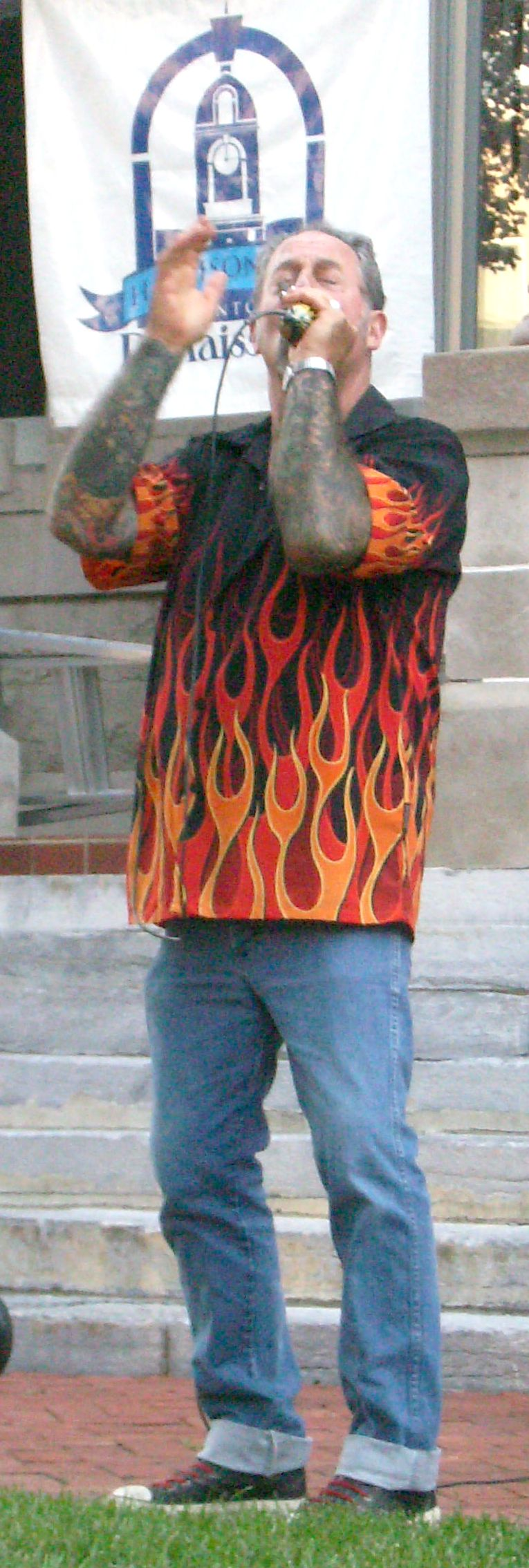
Mark Wenner cups his hands around a "bullet mic" as he plays an amplified harmonica.

==== Amplification devices ====
Since the 1950s, many blues harmonica players have amplified their instrument with microphones and tube amplifiers. One of the early innovators of this approach was Marion "Little Walter" Jacobs, who played the harmonica near a "Bullet" microphone marketed for use by radio taxi dispatchers. This gave his harmonica tone a "punchy" midrange sound that could be heard above an electric guitar. Also, tube amplifiers produce a natural growling overdrive when cranked at higher volumes, which adds body, fullness, and "grit" to the sound. Little Walter also cupped his hands around the instrument to create a kind of flexible chamber, giving it a powerful, distorted sound somewhat reminiscent of a saxophone, hence the term "Mississippi saxophone". Some harmonica players in folk use a regular vocal microphone, such as a Shure SM 58, for their harmonica, which gives a clean, natural sound.

As technology in amplification has progressed, harmonica players have introduced other effects units to their rigs, as well, such as reverb, tremolo, delay, octave, additional overdrive pedals, and chorus effect. John Popper of Blues Traveler uses a customized microphone that encapsulates several of these effects into one handheld unit, as opposed to several units in sequence. Many harmonica players still prefer tube amplifiers to solid-state ones, owing to the perceived difference in tone generated by the vacuum tubes. Players perceive tubes as having a "warmer" tone and a more "natural" overdrive sound. Many amplifiers designed for electric guitar are also used by harmonica players, such as the Kalamazoo Model Two, Fender Bassman, and the Danelectro Commando. Some expensive handmade boutique amplifiers are built from the ground up with characteristics that are optimal for amplified harmonica.

==== Rack or holder ====
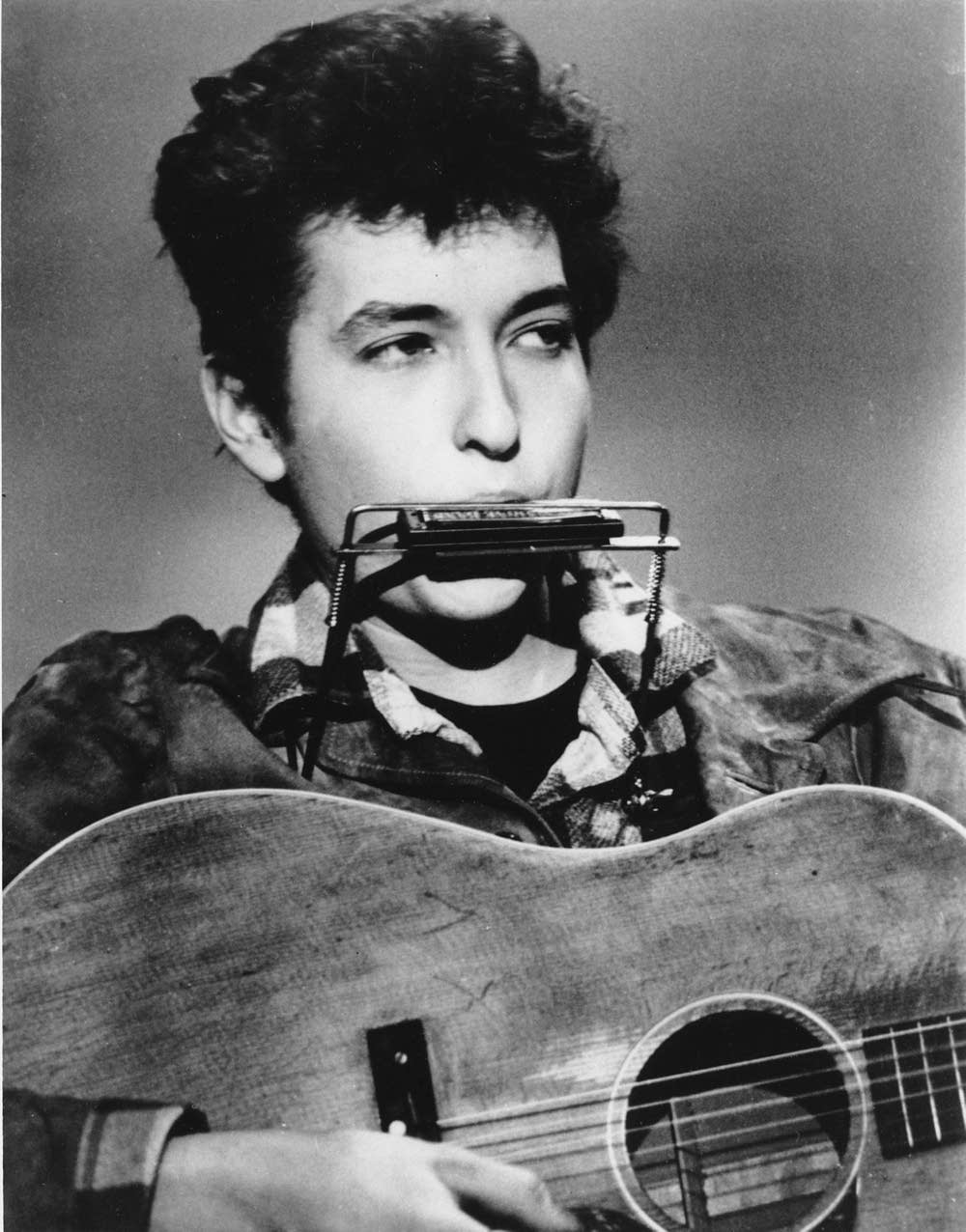
Bob Dylan, 1963: Dylan is wearing a harmonica holder.

Harmonica players who play the instrument while performing on another instrument with their hands (e.g., an acoustic guitar) often use an accessory called a neck rack or harmonica holder to position the instrument in front of their mouth. A harmonica holder clamps the harmonica between two metal brackets, which are attached to a curved loop of metal that rests on the shoulders. The original harmonica racks were made from wire or coat hangers. Models of harmonica racks vary widely by quality and ease of use, and experimenting with more than one model of harmonica rack is often needed to find one that feels suitable for each individual player. This device is used by folk musicians, one-man bands, and singer-songwriters such as Bob Dylan, Edoardo Bennato, Tom Harmon, Neil Young, Eddie Vedder, Billy Joel, Bruce Springsteen, and blues singers Jimmy Reed and John Hammond Jr.

== Types ==
=== Chromatic ===
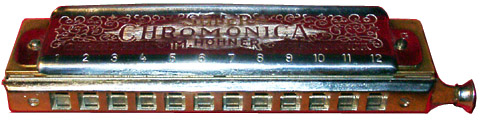
Hohner Super Chromonica, a typical 12-hole chromatic

The chromatic harmonica is designed to make all notes of the chromatic scale available (i.e. it can play all the flats and sharps, unlike a diatonic harmonica). It uses a button-activated sliding bar to redirect air from the hole in the mouthpiece to the selected reed-plate, though one design—the "Machino-Tone"—controlled airflow by means of a lever-operated flap on the rear of the instrument. A "hands-free" modification to the Hohner 270 (12-hole) lets the player shift the tones by moving the mouthpiece up and down with the lips, leaving the hands free to play another instrument. While the Richter-tuned 10-hole diatonic is intended to play in only one key, the 12-, 14-, and 16-hole chromatics allow the musician to play in any key desired with only one harmonica. This harp can be used for any style, including Celtic, classical, jazz, or blues (commonly in third position).

Here is the note layout for a 16-hole chromatic harmonica:

	1	2	3	4	1	2	3	4	5	6	7	8	9	10	11	12
slide-in blow	C♯	F	G♯	C♯	C♯	F	G♯	C♯	C♯	F	G♯	C♯	C♯	F	G♯	C♯
slide-out blow	C	E	G	C	C	E	G	C	C	E	G	C	C	E	G	C
slide-out draw	D	F	A	B	D	F	A	B	D	F	A	B	D	F	A	B
slide-in draw	D♯	F♯	A♯	C	D♯	F♯	A♯	C	D♯	F♯	A♯	C	D♯	F♯	A♯	D

Upper holes 1-12 are the same notes available on a 12-hole chromatic harmonica (C4-C♯7), and labelled to allow players to read the same sheet music. The additional lower octave (C3-B3) available on the 16-hole harmonica are also labelled 1-4 and are rarely written for, but necessary for mimicking the full range of soprano clarinet and alto saxophone.

=== Diatonic ===
Strictly speaking, diatonic denotes any harmonica designed to play in a single key—though the standard Richter-tuned diatonic harmonica can play other keys by forcing its reeds to play tones that are not part of its basic scale. Depending on the country, "diatonic harmonica" may mean either the tremolo harmonica (in East Asia) or blues harp (in Europe and North America). Other diatonic harmonicas include octave harmonicas.

Here is the note layout for a standard diatonic in the key of G major:

	1	2	3	4	5	6	7	8	9	10
blow	G	B	D	G	B	D	G	B	D	G
draw	A	D	F♯	A	C	E	F♯	A	C	E

Each hole is the same interval (here, a perfect fifth) from its key of C counterpart; on the diatonic scale, a G is a perfect fifth from C. The interval between keys can be used to find the note layout of any standard diatonic.

=== Tremolo-tuned ===
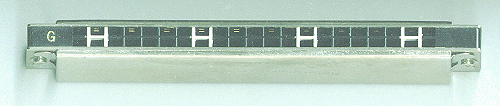
A tremolo harmonica

The distinguishing feature of the tremolo-tuned harmonica is that it has two reeds per note, with one slightly sharp and the other slightly flat. This provides a unique wavering or warbling sound created by the two reeds being slightly out of tune with each other and the difference in their subsequent waveforms interacting with each other (its beat). The East Asian version, which can produce all 12 semitones, is used often in East Asian rock and pop music.

=== Orchestral ===
Orchestral harmonicas are primarily designed for use in ensemble playing.

==== Melody ====
There are eight kinds of orchestral melody harmonica; the most common are the horn harmonicas often found in East Asia. These consist of a single large comb with blow-only reed-plates on the top and bottom. Each reed sits inside a single cell in the comb. One version mimics the layout of a piano or mallet instrument, with the natural notes of a C diatonic scale in the lower reed plate and the sharps and flats in the upper reed plate in groups of two and three holes with gaps in between like the black keys of a piano. Another version has one "sharp" reed directly above its "natural" on the lower plate, with the same number of reeds on both plates (therefore including E♯ and B♯).

Horn harmonicas are available in several pitch ranges, with the lowest pitched starting two octaves below middle C and the highest beginning on middle C itself; they usually cover a two- or three-octave range. They are chromatic instruments and are usually played in an East Asian harmonica orchestra instead of the "push-button" chromatic harmonica that is more common in the European and American tradition. Their reeds are often larger, and the enclosing "horn" gives them a different timbre, so that they often function in place of a brass section. In the past, they were referred to as horn harmonicas.

The other type of orchestral melodic harmonica is the polyphonia, (though some are marked "chromatica"). These have all twelve chromatic notes laid out on the same row. In most cases, they have both blow and draw of the same tone, though the No. 7 is blow only, and the No. 261, also blow only, has two reeds per hole, tuned an octave apart (all these designations refer to products of M. Hohner).

==== Chord ====
The chord harmonica has up to 48 chords: major, seventh, minor, augmented and diminished for ensemble playing. It is laid out in four-note clusters, each sounding a different chord on inhaling or exhaling. Typically each hole has two reeds for each note, tuned to one octave of each other. Less expensive models often have only one reed per note. Quite a few orchestra harmonicas are also designed to serve as both bass and chord harmonica, with bass notes next to chord groupings. There are also other chord harmonicas, such as the Chordomonica (which operates similar to a chromatic harmonica), and the junior chord harmonicas (which typically provide six chords).

The Suzuki SSCH-56 Compact Chord harmonica is a 48-chord harmonica built in a 14-hole chromatic harmonica enclosure. The first three holes play a major chord on blow and draw, with and without the slide. Holes 2, 3, and 4 play a diminished chord; holes 3, 4, and 5 play a minor chord; and holes 4, 5, and 6 play an augmented, for a total of sixteen chords. This pattern is repeated starting on hole 5, a whole step higher; and again starting on hole 9, for a total of 48 chords.

==== Bass ====
A bass harmonica is a harmonica which has reeds tuned to produce very low notes in the bass register. They are typically chromatic instruments that can play in any key and in at least two octaves. Unlike almost all other harmonicas, bass harmonicas can only produce sound by blowing air through the holes, not by breathing in. Bass harmonicas have two reeds tuned an octave apart for each note to create a deeper sound, often described as rumbling. Most bass harmonicas have historically consisted of two harmonicas hinged together, one with the natural notes and one with the sharps and flats, however in the present day integrated comb designs featuring keyboard layouts are often produced as well. Bass harmonicas are often very large in size; some manufacturers now produce single octave, diatonic 'pocket bass' harmonicas which are closer to the size of the standard blues harp but lack the traditional range of notes. Bass harmonicas have been featured occasionally in popular music such as in The Boxer by Simon & Garfunkel, The Fool on the Hill and Being for the Benefit of Mr. Kite! by The Beatles, and I Know There's an Answer by The Beach Boys.

=== ChengGong ===
The ChengGong harmonica has a main body, and a sliding mouthpiece. The body is a 24-hole diatonic harmonica that ranges from B_{2} to D_{6} (covering 3 octaves). Its 11-hole mouthpiece can slide along the front of the harmonica, which gives numerous chord choices and voicings (seven triads, three 6th chords, seven 7th chords, and seven 9th chords, for a total of 24 chords). As well, it is capable of playing single-note melodies and double stops over a range of three diatonic octaves. Unlike conventional harmonicas, blowing and drawing produce the same notes because its tuning is closer to the note layout of a typical East Asian tremolo harmonica or the Polyphonias.

=== Pitch pipe ===
The pitch pipe is a simple specialty harmonica that provides a reference pitch to singers and other instruments. The only difference between some early pitch-pipes and harmonicas is the name of the instrument, which reflected the maker's target audience. Chromatic pitch pipes, which are used by singers and choirs, give a full chromatic (12-note) octave. Pitch pipes are also sold for string players, such as violinists and guitarists; these pitch pipes usually provide the notes corresponding to the open strings.

== Techniques ==
Vibrato is a technique commonly used while playing the harmonica and many other instruments, to give the note a 'shaking' sound. This technique can be accomplished in a number of ways. The most common way is to change how the harmonica is held. For example, the vibrato effect can be achieved by opening and closing the hands around the harmonica very rapidly. The vibrato might also be achieved via rapid glottal (vocal fold) opening and closing, especially on draws (inhalation) simultaneous to bending, or without bending. This obviates the need for cupping and waving the hands around the instrument during play. An effect similar to vibrato is that of the 'trill' (or 'roll', or 'warble, or 'shake'); this technique has the player move their lips between two holes very quickly, either by shaking the head in a rapid motion or moving the harmonica from side to side within the embouchure. This gives a quick pitch-alternating technique that is slightly more than vibrato and achieves the same aural effect on sustained notes, albeit by using two different tones instead of varying the amplitude of one.

In addition to the 19 notes readily available on the diatonic harmonica, players can play other notes by adjusting their embouchure and forcing the reed to resonate at a different pitch. This technique is called bending, a term possibly borrowed from guitarists, who literally bend a string to subtly change the pitch. Bending also creates the glissandos characteristic of much blues harp and country harmonica playing. Bends are essential for most blues and rock harmonica due to the soulful sounds the instrument can bring out. The "wail" of the blues harp typically requires bending. In the 1970s, Howard Levy developed the over bending technique (also known as "overblowing" and "overdrawing".) Over Bending, combined with bending, allowed players to play the entire chromatic scale.

In addition to playing the diatonic harmonica in its original key, it is also possible to play it in other keys by playing in other "positions" using different keynotes. Using just the basic notes on the instrument would mean playing in a specific mode for each position. For example the Mixolydian mode (root note is the second draw or third blow), produces a major dominant seventh key that is frequently used by blues players because it contains the harmonically rich dominant seventh note, while the Dorian mode (root note is four draw) produces a minor dominant seventh key. Harmonica players (especially blues players) have developed terminology around different "positions", which can be confusing to other musicians, for example the slang terminology for the most common positions (1st being 'straight', 2nd being 'cross', 3rd being 'slant', etc.).

Another technique, seldom used to its full potential, is altering the size of the mouth cavity to emphasize certain natural overtones. When this technique is employed while playing chords, care must be taken in overtone selection as the overtones stemming from the non-root pitch can cause extreme dissonance.

Harmonica players who amplify their instrument with microphones and tube amplifiers, such as blues harp players, also have a range of techniques that exploit properties of the microphone and the amplifier, such as changing the way the hands are cupped around the instrument and the microphone or rhythmically breathing or chanting into the microphone while playing.

== History ==
The harmonica was developed in Europe in the early part of the 19th century. Free-reed instruments like the Chinese sheng had been fairly common in East Asia since ancient times. They became relatively well known in Europe after being introduced by the French Jesuit Jean Joseph Marie Amiot (1718–1793), who lived in Qing-era China. Around 1820, free-reed designs began being created in Europe. Christian Friedrich Ludwig Buschmann is often cited as the inventor of the harmonica in 1821, but other inventors developed similar instruments at the same time. In 1829, Charles Wheatstone developed a mouth-organ under the name "Aeolina" (inspired by the Aeolian harp). Mouth-blown free-reed instruments appeared in the United States, South America, the United Kingdom and Europe at roughly the same time. These instruments were made for playing classical music.

=== Early instruments ===
The harmonica first appeared in Vienna, where harmonicas with chambers were sold before 1824 (see also Anton Reinlein and Anton Haeckl). Richter tuning, invented by Joseph Richter (who also is credited with inventing the blow and draw mechanism), was created in 1826 and was eventually adopted nearly universally. In Germany, violin manufacturer Johann Georg Meisel from Klingenthal bought a harmonica with chambers (Kanzellen) at an exhibition in Braunschweig in 1824. He and the ironworker Langhammer copied the instruments in Graslitz three miles away; by 1827 they had produced hundreds of harmonicas. Many others followed in Germany and also nearby Bohemia. In 1829, Johann Wilhelm Rudolph Glier also began making harmonicas.

In 1830, Christian Messner, a cloth maker and weaver from Trossingen, copied a harmonica his neighbour had brought from Vienna. He had such success that eventually his brother and some relatives also started to make harmonicas. From 1840, his nephew Christian Weiss was also involved in the business. By 1855, there were at least three harmonica-making businesses: C. A. Seydel Söhne, Christian Messner & Co., and Württ. Harmonikafabrik Ch. Weiss. (Currently, only C.A. Seydel is still in business.) Owing to competition between the harmonica factories in Trossingen and Klingenthal, machines were invented to punch the covers for the reeds.

In 1857, Matthias Hohner, a clockmaker from Trossingen, started producing harmonicas. Eventually he became the first to mass-produce them. He used a mass-produced wooden comb that he had made by machine-cutting firms. By 1868, he began supplying the United States. By the 1920s, the diatonic harmonica had largely reached its modern form. Other types followed soon thereafter, including the various tremolo and octave harmonicas.

By the late 19th century, harmonica production was a big business, having evolved into mass production. New designs were still developed in the 20th century, including the chromatic harmonica, first made by Hohner in 1924, the bass harmonica, and the chord harmonica. In the 21st century, radical new designs have been developed and are still being introduced into the market, such as the Suzuki Overdrive, Hohner XB-40, and the ill-fated Harrison B-Radical.

Diatonic harmonicas were designed primarily for playing German and other European folk music and have succeeded well in those styles. Over time, the basic design and tuning proved adaptable to other types of music such as the blues, country, old-time and more. The harmonica was a success almost from the very start of production, and while the center of the harmonica business has shifted from Germany, the output of the various harmonica manufacturers is still very high. Major companies are now found in Germany (Seydel and Hohner – the dominant manufacturer in the world), South Korea (Miwha, Dabell), Japan (Suzuki, Tombo – the manufacturer of the popular Lee Oskar harmonica, and Yamaha also made harmonicas until the 1970s), China (Huang, Easttop, Johnson, Leo Shi, Swan, AXL), and Brazil (Hering, Bends). The United States had two significant harmonica manufacturers, and both were based in Union, New Jersey. One was Magnus Harmonica Corporation, whose founder Finn Magnus is credited with the development of plastic harmonica reeds. The other was Wm. Kratt Company, which, founded by German-American William Jacob "Bill" Kratt Sr., originally made pitch pipes and later, in 1952, secured a patent for combs made of plastic. Both companies ceased harmonica production. The only recent American contender in the harmonica market was Harrison Harmonicas, which folded in July 2011. It was announced soon thereafter that the rights to the Harrison design had been sold to another company to finish production of orders already placed. In October 2012, it was revealed that a Beloit, Wisconsin, investment corporation, R&R Opportunities, had bought the assets of Harrison Harmonicas and that a feasibility study was under way to assess the possibilities of continued production of the Harrison B-Radical harmonica. Recently, responding to increasingly demanding performance techniques, the market for high-quality instruments has grown.

=== Europe and North America ===
Some time before Hohner began manufacturing harmonicas in 1857, he shipped some to relatives who had emigrated to the United States. Its music rapidly became popular, and the country became an enormous market for Hohner's goods. US president Abraham Lincoln carried a harmonica in his pocket, and harmonicas provided solace to soldiers on both the Union and Confederate sides of the American Civil War. Frontiersmen Wyatt Earp and Billy the Kid played the instrument, and it became a fixture of the American musical landscape.

Harmonicas were heard on a handful of recordings in the early 1900s, generally labeled as a "mouth organ". The first jazz or traditional music recordings of harmonicas were made in the U.S. in the mid-1920s. Recordings known at the time as "race records", intended for the black market of the southern states, included solo recordings by DeFord Bailey and duo recordings with a guitarist (Hammie Nixon, Walter Horton, or Sonny Terry). Hillbilly styles were also recorded, intended for white audiences, by Frank Hutchison, Gwen Foster and several other musicians. There are also recordings featuring the harmonica in jug bands, of which the Memphis Jug Band is the most famous. But the harmonica still represented a toy instrument in those years and was associated with the poor. It is also during those years that musicians started experimenting with new techniques such as tongue-blocking, hand effects and the most important innovation of all, the second position, or cross-harp.

A significant contributor to the expanding popularity of the harmonica was a New York-based radio program called the Hohner Harmony Hour, which taught listeners how to play. Listeners could play along with the program to increase their proficiency. The radio program gained wide popularity after the unveiling of the 1925 White House Christmas tree, which was adorned with fifty harmonicas.

The harmonica's versatility brought it to the attention of classical musicians during the 1930s. American Larry Adler was one of the first harmonica players to perform major works written for the instrument by the composers Ralph Vaughan Williams, Malcolm Arnold, Darius Milhaud, and Arthur Benjamin.

Harmonicas were scarce in the United States during World War II. Wood and metal materials for harmonicas were in short supply because of military demand. Furthermore, the primary harmonica manufacturers were based in Germany and Japan, the enemies of the United States and the Allied forces in the war. During this time, Finn Haakon Magnus, a Danish-American factory worker and entrepreneur, developed and perfected the molded plastic harmonica. The plastic harmonica used molded plastic combs and far fewer pieces than traditional metal or wood harmonicas, which made the harmonica more economical to mass-produce and more sanitary. Though the plastic reeds in these harmonicas produced a less distinctive (and, to many ears, inferior) sound than their metallic counterparts, Magnus harmonicas and several imitators soon became commonplace, particularly among children. The patent for the plastic comb was awarded to William Kratt of Wm. Kratt Company in 1952. During World War II, the War Department allotted a rationed supply of brass to Kratt's factory so they could continue to produce harmonicas that the Red Cross distributed to American troops overseas to boost morale.

=== East Asia ===
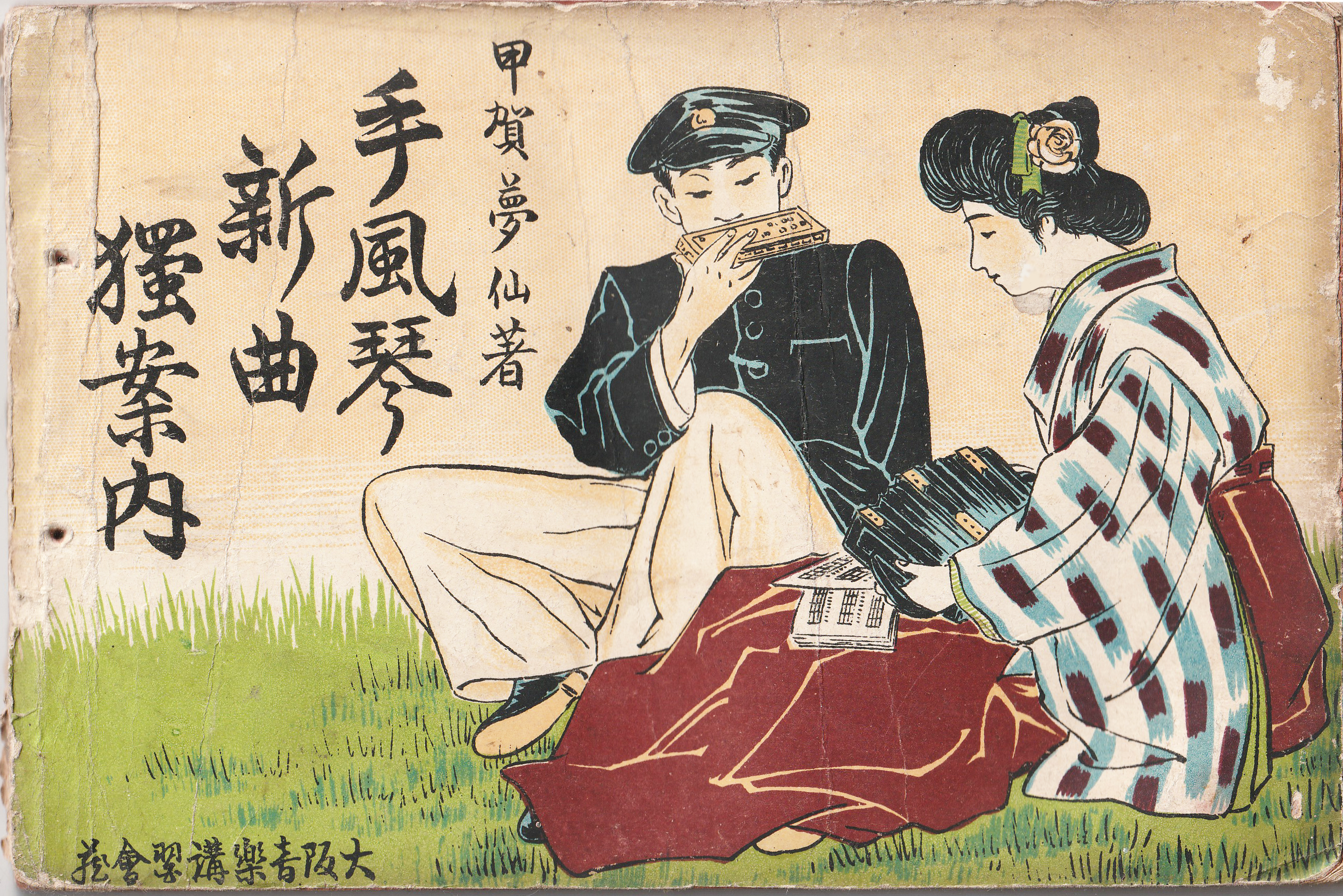
A school boy playing harmonica, and a school girl playing one-row diatonic accordion. A self-study book published in 1899 in Japan.

In 1898, the harmonica was brought to Japan, where the Tremolo harmonica was the most popular instrument. After about 30 years, the Japanese developed scale tuning and semitone harmonicas that could play Japanese folk songs.

==== Japanese tremolo tuning ====
In Europe and the United States, tremolo harmonica uses the Richter tuning, developed in Germany. In 1913, Shōgo Kawaguchi (川口章吾), known in Japan as the "Father of the harmonica", devised an alternate tuning, which is more suited to playing Japanese folk tunes. This tuning is also suited to local music throughout East Asia, and harmonicas using the tuning became popular in the region.

==== Minor key tuning ====
Initial diatonic harmonica tunings were major key only. In 1931, Hiderō Satō (佐藤秀廊) announced the development of a minor key harmonica. There are two types of minor key tunings, "natural minor" suitable for folk and contemporary music, and Latin American music, and the "harmonic minor" suitable for some famous Japanese pieces.

==== Hong Kong and Taiwan ====
The harmonica started to gain popularity in Hong Kong in the 1930s. Individual tremolo harmonica players from China moved to Hong Kong and established numerous harmonica organizations such as The Chinese Y.M.C.A. Harmonica Orchestra, the China Harmonica Society, and the Heart String Harmonica Society. During the 1950s, chromatic harmonica became popular in Hong Kong, and players such as Larry Adler and John Sebastian Sr. were invited to perform.

Local players such as Lau Mok (劉牧) and Fung On (馮安) promoted the chromatic harmonica. The chromatic harmonica gradually became the main instrument used by the Chinese Y.M.C.A. Harmonica Orchestra. The Chinese YMCA Harmonica Orchestra started in the 1960s, with 100 members, most of whom played harmonicas. Non-harmonica instruments were also used, such as double bass, accordion, piano, and percussion such as timpani and xylophone.

In the 1970s, the Haletone Harmonica Orchestra (曉彤口琴隊) was set up at Wong Tai Sin Community Centre. Fung On and others continued to teach harmonica and also set up harmonica orchestras. In the 1980s, numbers of harmonica students steadily decreased. In the 1990s, harmonica players from Hong Kong began to participate in international harmonica competitions, including the World Harmonica Festival in Germany and the Asia Pacific Harmonica Festival. In the 2000s, the Hong Kong Harmonica Association (H.K.H.A.) (香港口琴協會) was established.

The history of the harmonica in Taiwan began around 1945. By the 1980s, though, as living standards improved, many instruments once beyond the budgets of most Taiwanese started to become more accessible and popular in preference to the harmonica.

== Medical use ==
Playing the harmonica requires inhaling and exhaling strongly against resistance. This action helps develop a strong diaphragm and deep breathing using the entire lung volume. Pulmonary specialists have noted that playing the harmonica resembles the kind of exercise used to rehabilitate COPD patients such as using a PFLEX inspiratory muscle trainer or the inspiratory spirometer. Learning to play a musical instrument also offers motivation in addition to the exercise component. Many pulmonary rehabilitation programs therefore have begun to incorporate the harmonica.

When President Ronald Reagan suffered a punctured lung in the 1981 attempt on his life, his breathing therapist was Howard McDonald, of the Cambridge Harmonica Orchestra. Orchestra director Pierre Beauregard had hoped that Reagan's therapeutic harmonica experience would help them get a chance to play at the White House, but this never occurred.

== Related instruments ==
The concertina, diatonic and chromatic accordions and the melodica are all free-reed instruments that developed alongside the harmonica. Indeed, the similarities between harmonicas and so-called "diatonic" accordions or melodeons is such that in German the name for the former is "Mundharmonika" and the latter "Handharmonika", which translate as "mouth harmonica" and "hand harmonica". In Scandinavian languages, an accordion is called variants of "trekkspill" (pull play) or "trekkharmonika" whereas a harmonica is called "munnspill" (mouth play) or "mundharmonika" (mouth harmonica). The names for the two instruments in the Slavic languages are also either similar or identical. The harmonica shares similarities to all other free-reed instruments by virtue of the method of sound production.

The glass harmonica, invented by Benjamin Franklin in 1761, has the word "harmonica" in its name, but it is not related to free-reed instruments. The glass harmonica is a musical instrument formed from a nested set of graduated glass cups mounted sideways on an axle. Each of the glass cups is tuned to a different note, and they are arranged in a scalar order. It is played by touching the rotating cups with wetted fingers, causing them to vibrate and produce a sustained "singing" tone.

== See also ==
- List of harmonicists
