= Leopoldine Blahetka =

Austrian pianist and composer

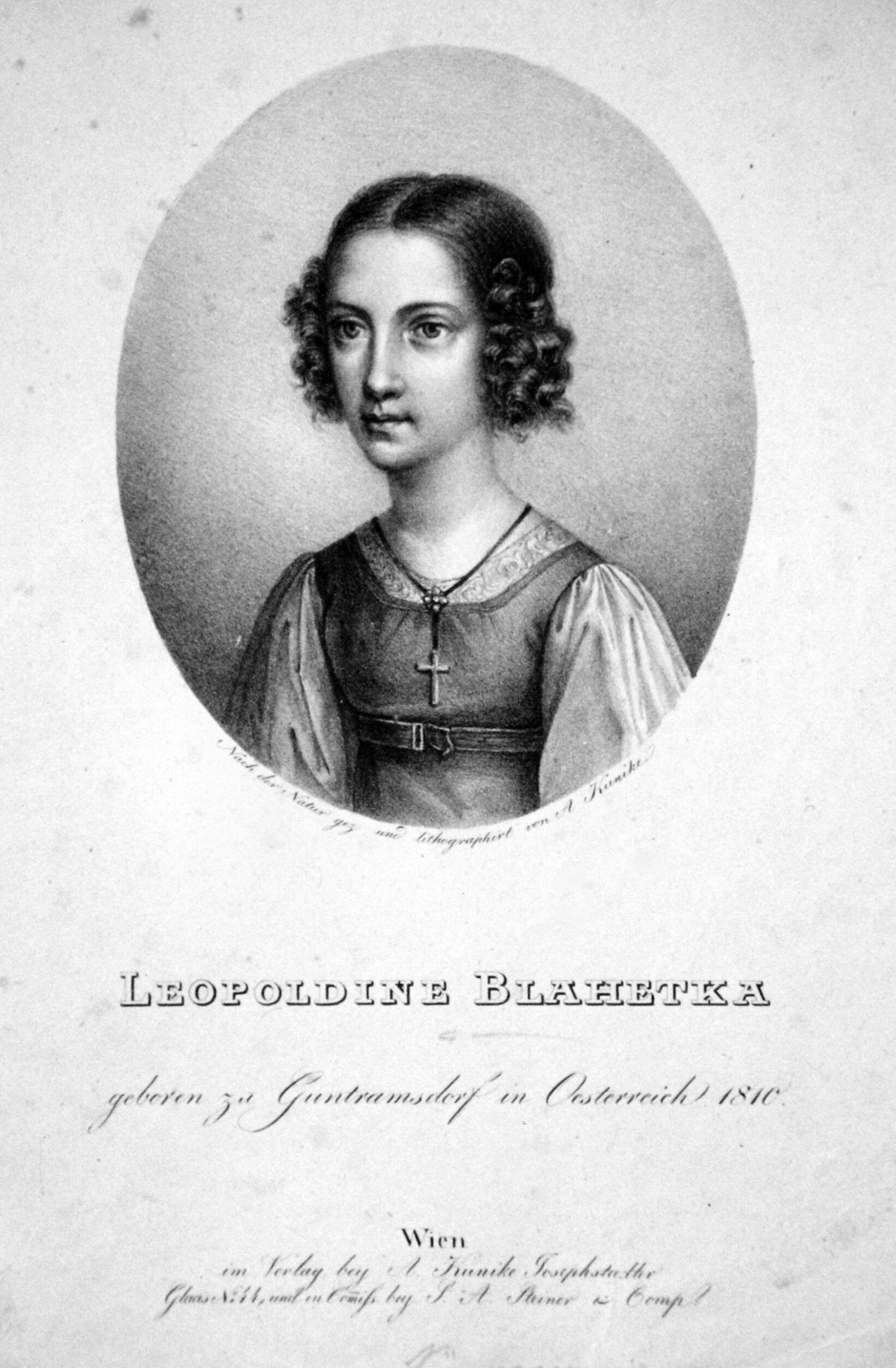
Leopoldine Blahetka

Marie Leopoldine Blahetka (16 November 1809 – 17 January 1885) was an Austrian pianist and composer.

== Life ==
Leopoldine Blahetka was born in Guntramsdorf near Vienna, the child of George and Barbara Joseph Blahetka Sophia, née Traeg. Her father was a history and mathematics teacher and had good relations with Ludwig van Beethoven, and her mother a physharmonica teacher and performer. Her maternal grandfather was the Viennese composer Andreas Traeg.

At the age of 9, Leopoldine Blahetka made her first public appearances, and the Viennese press described her as a "child prodigy". At the age of 11 she created her first compositions, which she also performed regularly as part of her concerts.

The family moved to Vienna and George Blahetka took a job with the Traeg music publishing house. Leopoldine took piano lessons from her mother and made her debut as a pianist in 1818. Afterwards, she studied with Joseph Czerny, Hieronymus Payer, Eduard Freiherr von Lannoy, Joachim Hoffmann, Catherina Cibbini-Kozeluch, Friedrich Kalkbrenner, Ignaz Moscheles, and later composition with Simon Sechter.

In 1821 Blahetka began touring Europe, accompanied by her mother, and continued to tour for about twenty years. In about 1830 the family moved to Boulogne-sur-Mer, France, seeking a better climate. Blahetka died in Boulogne-sur Mer. In 1825/26 to Munich, Karlsruhe, Berlin, Hamburg and Leipzig, among others. In 1830 she gave concerts in Graz and Klagenfurt and undertook a longer concert tour via Munich, Frankfurt am Main, Gotha, The Hague and Brussels to London. Robert Schumann, who heard her on her concert tour in Germany, judged her playing to be "a truly feminine one, delicate, prudent and elaborate". He was also very impressed by her compositions.

== Works ==
Selected works include:

- op. 9, Grande polonaise concertante pour le piano forte et violoncello
- op. 13, Variations sur un thème favorite
- op. 14, Variations brillantes
- op. 15, Sonate for violin
- op. 16, Nr. 1, 6 Deutsche Lieder: Die Nebelbilder
- op. 16, Nr. 2, 6 Deutsche Lieder: Der Getröstete
- op. 16, Nr. 3, 6 Deutsche Lieder: Die Totenklage
- op. 16, Nr. 4, 6 Deutsche Lieder: Die fernen Berge
- op. 16, Nr. 5, 6 Deutsche Lieder: Sehnsucht
- op. 16, Nr. 6, 6 Deutsche Lieder: Matrosenlied
- op. 18, Variations brillantes sur un thème hongrois
- op. 19, Polonaise D-Dur
- op. 20, Variations brillantes sur le Siège de Corinthe
- op. 25, Konzertstück for piano and (optional) string quartet or orchestra
- op. 26, Six Valses avec Trio et Coda
- op. 26a, Variationen über ein Thema aus der Oper 'Die Stumme' von Portici
- op. 27, Variations sur un thème tyrolien
- op. 28, Variations sur la chanson nationale autrichienne Gott erhalte Franz den Kaiser
- op. 29, Variations sur un thème de Gallenberg
- op. 32, Rastlose Liebe
- op. 39, Introduction and Variations for flute and piano
- op. 43, Piano Quartet
- op. 44, 2nd Piano Quartet
- op. 47, Grand Duo (for Piano 4-hands)
- op. 48, Capriccio for Piano
