= Hieronymus Payer =

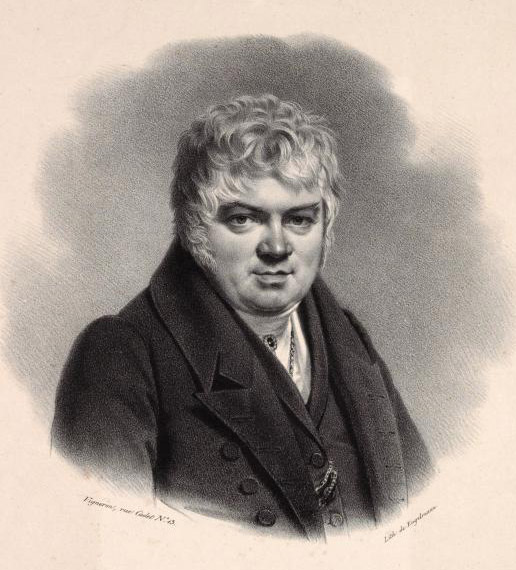
Hieronymus Payer

Hieronymus Prayer (13 February 1787 in Vienna-Meidling – 17 August 1845 in Vienna-Meidling) was an Austrian composer and

st.

== Life and career ==
Hieronymus (Jérome) Payer was the son of a teacher. As a 10-year-old he earned his living as a backup musician and was then hired as an assistant teacher of his father's. In 1806 he became a conductor in the so-called Meidlinger Summer Theatre, for which he even wrote some small Singspiels. Later he moved to the Innere Stadt of Vienna and performed in the Redoutensaal and Theater an der Wien successfully. He was active as a teacher, including of Leopoldine Blahetka.

Payer introduced in 1821 in Vienna for the first time the Physharmonica in a public concert. Three years later he became a conductor in Amsterdam (at the Hoogduitse Schouwburg) and in 1825, in Paris. In 1832 he returned to Vienna as conductor for a short time in the Theater in der Josefstadt. As a pianist he had been compared by his contemporaries with Johann Nepomuk Hummel, Ignaz Moscheles and Ferdinand Ries.

== Works (selection) ==
6 masses and other sacred works, 10 operas and operettas, including;

- Der wilde Jäger, Meidling 1806 or 26. July 1807
- L’arbre creux, Meidling 1808
- Der hohle Baum, Meidling 1810
- Die musikalische Akademie, 1825
- Die Trauer, 1825
- Hochlands Fürsten, 1825 (libretto: Carl Schütz), has also appeared Johann Nestroy
- La croix de feu, 1830

Instrumental music

- Overtures, concertos, marches, waltzes, piano music, chamber music

== Sources ==
- August Schmidt: Denksteine 1848, pp. 95–110
- Jürgen Hein: Nestroy in Amsterdam, Nestroyana, 8/3–4, pp. 52–70.
- Henk J. Koning: Nestroy in Amsterdam. Zur Rezeption seiner Stücke auf der holländischen Bühne des 19. Jahrhunderts, Nestroyana, 14/3–4, pp. 91–100.
- Gerrit Waidelich: Dokumente zu Nestroys Amsterdamer Engagement in Korrespondenzberichten über das dortige Deutsche Theater, Nestroyana, 17/1-2 (1997), pp. 24–38.
