= Terpodion =

Keyboard instrument

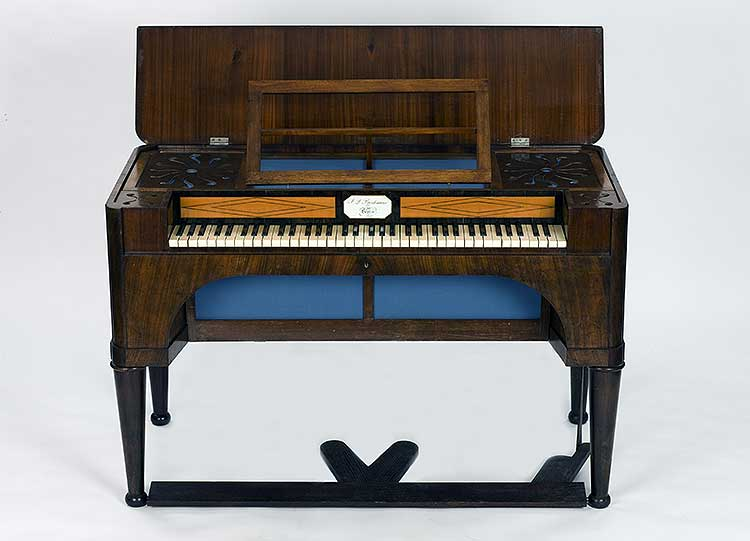
- Terpodion by Johann David Buschmann (1773–1852). Circa 1825 Berlin Signature "J.D. Buschmann in Berlin" Keyboard range: F1-f4 (six octaves). Restored 2006/07: Andreas Hermert / Meike Wolters. H 830 mm, W 1296 mm, D 666 mm, Inv.-Nr.: V/J 417, Städtische Museen Junge Kunst und Viadrina, 15230 Frankfurt (Oder)
- Other names: Uranion
- Classification: Idiophone
- Inventor: Johann David Buschmann
- Developed: 1816

The terpodion or uranion is a keyboard instrument which produces sound using the same friction principle as the glass armonica. Instead of rotating glass bells, a wooden cylinder coated with a special mixture is rotated. Examples of these instruments can be seen in museums all over Europe, including museums in Copenhagen, Leipzig, Vienna, London, Brussels, Stockholm, Jevišovice and Frankfurt/Oder.

== Manufacture history ==
Only 25 instruments were ever built by Christian Friedrich Ludwig Buschmann, the son of Johann David Buschmann, the inventor of this instrument. Johann David Buschmann was first a passementier, then he started repairing key instruments. By 1817 the instrument spanned a range of 5 1/2 octaves.

In 1821, one such instrument arrived in London. Also in 1821, David Buschmann sold a licence for building terpodions to the instrument builder David Loescham and the cheesemonger James Allwright. Following this, only one instrument was ever built in England. In 1841, another report could be read in the London newspaper.

== Mechanics ==
A Terpodion being played

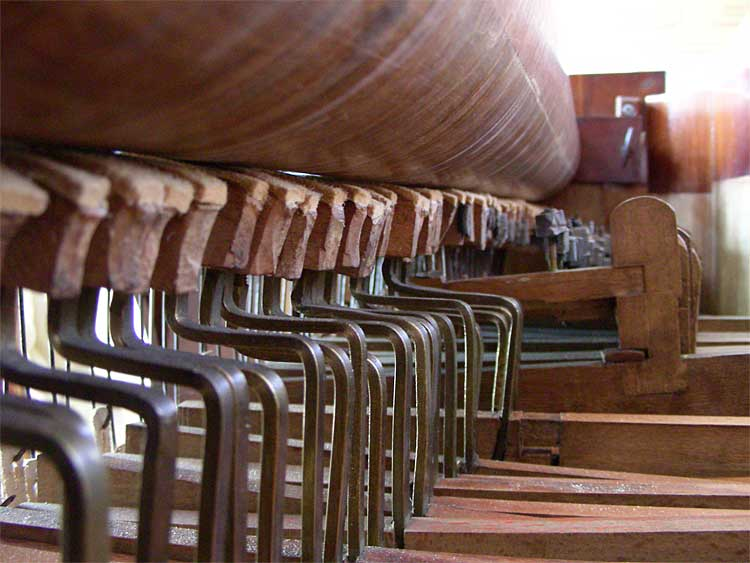
Terpodion interior view, Inv.-Nr.: V/J 417, Städtische Museen Junge Kunst und Viadrina, 15230 Frankfurt (Oder)

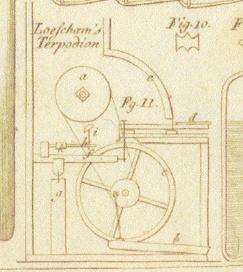
Patent drawing of the terpodion

The terpodion is a friction idiophone, similar to the glass harmonica and clavicylinder. The design itself was based on ideas by Ernst Chladni.

The glass harmonica produces sound from the friction of touching the rotating bells with wet fingers. With the terpodion, the player uses pedals to rotate a wooden cylinder which is treated with rosin before playing. When the keys are pressed, a felt- or suede-coated wooden or metal friction rod makes contact with the rotating coated cylinder. The vibrations travel through the connecting arms to the wooden sounding boards below.

The arms for lower notes are mainly made of wood, and for higher notes they are made of metal. The arms are adjustable so the pitch of each note can be adjusted within the tuning process. For increasing pitch, the length of the sounding board decreases, and the height increases. The terpodion rarely requires tuning.

The rotating cylinder is made from box wood (Buxus sempervirens), but the patent states it could be any material. The most important aspect of the cylinder is the coating. The exact mixture can be seen in the patent document: 2 parts ethanol, 1 part mastic, 1 part sandarac, 1/16 part camphor. The vibrating parts are pushed by the key mechanism toward the rotating cylinder so a sort of hammer that is covered by soft rough leather, which is coated with same mixture as the cylinder.

The volume of the sound is dependent on the amount of pressure applied to the keys. The lower register requires more pressure for the same amount of volume as the higher register.

The instrument did not stay playable for long and had to be serviced from time to time. This may be one of the reasons why the Buschmanns looked for other ways of producing the sound, and replaced the friction sound production with free reeds on other instruments. The instrument had piano keys, and a similar look to the later reed organs. On the other hand, there were also instruments built that had both a keyboard for the friction sound and another one for the free reed sound. Buschmann was one of the first to use vacuum type reeds in his physharmonicas.

=== The Melodion of Dietz ===
The melodion was very much like the terpodion. The one invented in 1806 by Dietz in Emmerich was presented to the public by Petzhold (or Betzold) in many places in Europe. There was only one main difference; all the sound came from vibrating metal structures.

"Der Ton wird durch die Reibung metallener Stäbe [...] mittelst dem mit einem elastischen Körper umringten, sich umdrehenden Cylinders hervorgebracht, welcher [...] mit den Füssen des Spielers in Bewegung gehalten wird, [...]"

Vom Melodion wurden bei weitem mehr Instrumente gebaut als vom Terpodeon. "Seine Fabrik ist bereits in solchem Flor[irenden Zustand], dass beständig gegen dreyssig [(30)] Instrumente in Arbeit sind. Der meiste Absatz schränkt sich jetzt nur noch auf das benachbarte Holland und Westphalen ein, wo der Erfinder auf einer kleinen Reise selbst dieses Instrument [vorführte] [...]."

Befeuchtet wurde im Gegensatz zum Clavicylinder dabei nichts. "- Und ohne Gebrauch des Wassers hervorgebracht; der innere [...] Mechanismus, hat wol die meiste Aehnlichkeit mit dem, des Chladnischen Klavieylinders, ist aber weniger zusammengesetzt und weit vollkommener ausgeführt."

The tuning or retuning to up to a quarter note could be adjusted by screws for each note individually. Readjusting did not have to take place at all if one was happy with the tuning reverence note. The metal structures kept better to the pitch than wooden parts. Dietz also invented the chalybssonnans. This used friction on glass or metal rods by rubbing the rods along their length. The sound was much like the one produced by the glass harmonicas.
