= Tremolo harmonica =

Musical instrument

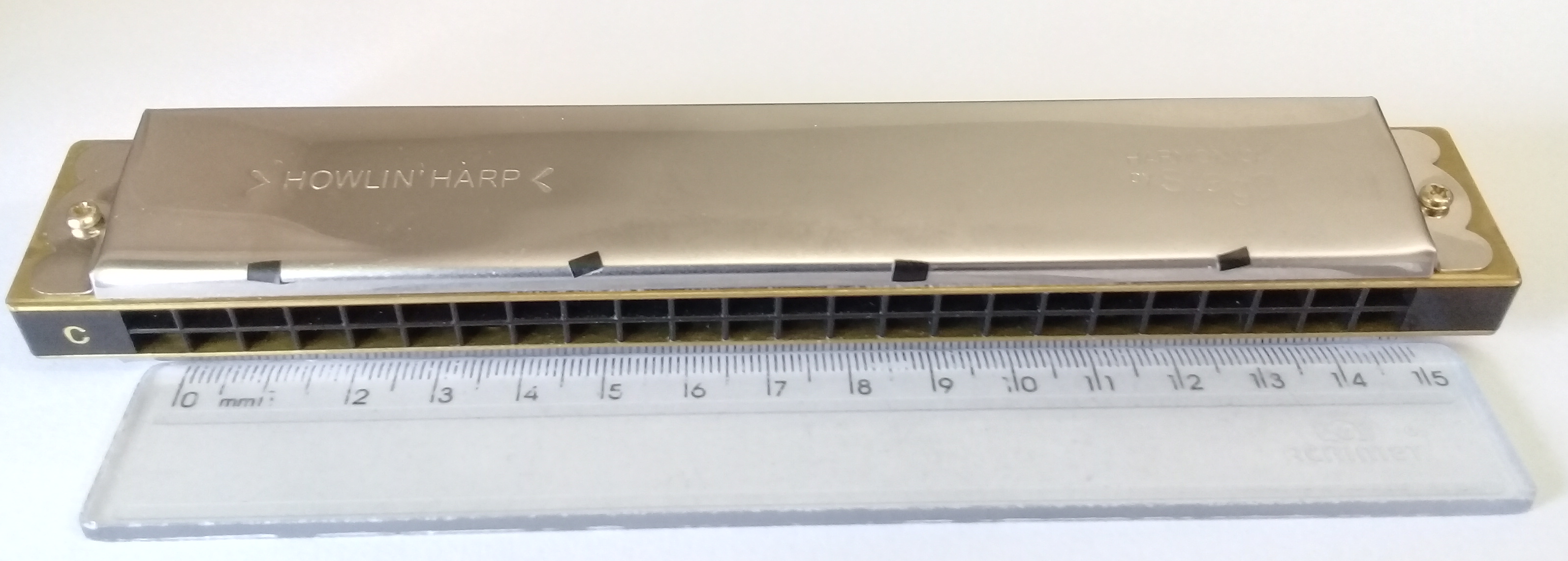
A tremolo harmonica

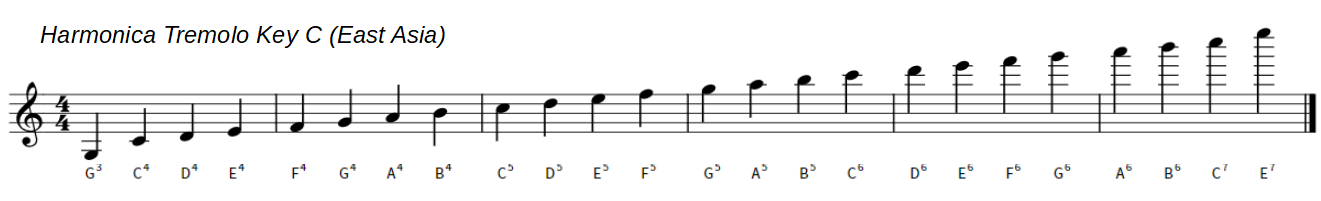
Pitch range for Tremolo Harmonica (common east Asia)

A tremolo harmonica is a type of diatonic harmonica, distinct by having two reeds per note. In a tremolo harmonica, the two reeds are tuned slightly off a reference pitch, one slightly sharp and the other slightly flat. This gives a unique wavering or warbling sound created by the two reeds being not exactly in tune with each other and difference in their subsequent waveforms acting against one another. The degree of beating can be varied depending on the desired effect. Instruments where the beating is faster due to the reeds being farther apart from the reference pitch are called "wet", whereas those where the beating is slower and less noticeable due to the reeds being more closely in tune are called "dry".

== Tremolo distinction ==
"Tremolo" is most often defined as a periodic change of volume (sometimes incorrectly defined as a change in pitch, strictly vibrato). Most orchestral instruments achieve this effect by repeated playing of a single note. The tremolo harmonica achieves the effect by employing the physical phenomenon called beats. Each note is played simultaneously by two reeds, fractionally out of tune with each other. The resulting sound is of constant pitch but the volume oscillates between loud and quiet. This effect is fairly common amongst Western free-reed instruments and is found in accordions, harmoniums and reed organs under various names (celeste, vox jubilante, etc.), but it is also used, for example, on the piano, where each of the three strings is tuned very slightly sharper or flatter, giving a richer sound to the instrument.

=== Wiener system ===
Most tremolo harmonicas are built upon what is termed the "Wiener system", named after the city of Vienna (Wien in Austria) where they first emerged. In this design the two beating reeds are distributed one on each reed-plate (top and bottom) and these share a common chamber. In practice, however, it is common for each individual reed to have its own air chamber. Unlike the standard ten-hole harmonicas (built on the "Richter system", e.g. Hohner's Marine Band) the blow and draw reeds do not share a common chamber, but are separated off from one another. This allows the player to isolate each reed. While normally the player simply plays both the tremolo reeds at once, it is possible to achieve a wide variety of bends and other effects through selecting certain reeds and chambers and not others. Similarly, it is possible to play without the tremolo effect by only choosing the top or bottom chambers and blocking off the others with the lips. In practice, though, these are primarily used for effects and mostly the instrument is played as if the two beating reeds shared a single chamber.

=== Tuning ===
There are three commonly encountered tunings or note layouts used for tremolo harmonicas. The older layout is very similar to that used in the standard diatonic harmonica and also found in diatonic accordions and concertinas. This tuning has the major diatonic scale in the middle and top octaves of the harmonica with two chords in the lowest octave: the tonic in the blow and the dominant or fifth chord in the draw. This is very effective for chordal playing behind relatively simple folk melodies in either the tonic or the fifth of the key of the harmonica. In Asia, the fourths and the sixths are added back in, in order to play the melody; however, it is still unlike the scale tuning mentioned below, since the octaves are not repeated throughout the layout.

Common tuning in Europe and North America
Hohner's labeling	1		2		3		4		5		6		7		8		9		10	
standard labeling	1	2	3	4	5	6	7	8	9	10	11	12	13	14	15	16	17	18	19	20
blow	C		E		G		C		E		G		C		E		G		C	
draw		D		G		B		D		F		A		B		D		F		A

Common tuning in East Asia
	1	2	3	4	5	6	7	8	9	10	11	12	13	14	15	16	17	18	19	20	21	22	23	24
blow	G^{3}		C^{4}		E^{4}		G^{4}		C^{5}		E^{5}		G^{5}		C^{6}		E^{6}		G^{6}		C^{7}		E^{7}	
draw		D^{4}		F^{4}		A^{4}		B^{4}		D^{5}		F^{5}		A^{5}		B^{5}		D^{6}		F^{6}		A^{6}		B^{6}

A more recently developed tuning is commonly found on tremolos manufactured in or designed for Asia. This layout is derived from the "solo" tuning found in chromatic harmonicas and is sometimes called "scale" tuning. Here the notes of the major scale are found throughout the range of the harmonica without a separate chord section in the bass octave. This helps to facilitate a common practice in Asia of playing both a C and C♯ harmonica stacked in order to achieve full chromaticity by having essentially the same notes available in each octave of the harmonica. This tuning is also applied to Tombo's S-50.

Scale tuning
	1	2	3	4	5	6	7	8	9	10	11	12	13	14	15	16	17	18	19	20	21	22	23	24
blow	C		E		G		C		C		E		G		C		C		E		G		C	
draw		D		F		A		B		D		F		A		B		D		F		A		B

Note: Some manufacturers replace the repeated root note (7 and 15) with a spacer (see S-50), or just completely do away with it (e.g.: Hohner).

Recently, Hohner also released a scale-tuned tremolo, the "21 Tremolo De Luxe", which has three complete scale-tuned octaves.

== Use ==
Tremolo harmonicas are perhaps the most common form of harmonica in the world, being very popular in folk music as well as in much of East Asia. In the West, the tremolo harmonica is usually encountered in traditional folk music, being found throughout Europe and South America in this role. In China, Japan, Korea, Taiwan and other parts of Asia, however, tremolo harmonicas are found in nearly every area of music from folk to classical — in fact, there are specially manufactured tremolo harmonicas for ensemble playing. Players often use several different harmonicas at a time, holding them one atop the other, in order to play notes and chords not available on any single instrument.

== Other ==
There are chromatic tremolo harmonicas, which combine the slider design of the chromatic harmonica with the dual reed beating sound of the tremolo harmonica. Harmonica technician John Infande has been manufacturing his own design in limited numbers for several years, while the Japanese harmonica company, Suzuki Musical Instrument Corporation, has recently released its design.
