= Omnichord =

Electronic musical instrument

Suzuki Omnichord
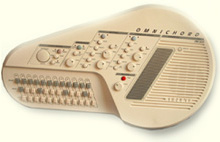
- Omnichord OM-150 front panel
- Manufacturer: Suzuki Musical Instrument Corporation
- Dates: 1981–1996, 1999, 2024

Technical specifications
- Polyphony: Full polyphony
- Synthesis type: OM-27/36/84 – analog, OM-100/150/300 – sample-based
- Filter: None
- Aftertouch expression: No

Input/output
- Keyboard: Strum plate, chord buttons
- External control: OM-200M/250M/300 – MIDI out Qchord – MIDI in & out

The Omnichord is an electronic musical instrument introduced in 1981 by the Suzuki Musical Instrument Corporation. Conceived as an electronic autoharp, it allows users to play harp-like arpeggios produced through an electronic strum plate, simulating the experience of playing a stringed instrument. The Omnichord found popularity due to its portability, unique timbre, and kitsch value.

The various Omnichord models feature organ-like chords, preset drum rhythms and auto-bass line functionality. A grid of buttons allow the user to select major, minor, and 7th chords to be triggered by the strum plate, chord buttons and bassline accompaniment.

Production ceased with the OM-300 model in 1996. In later years, the Omnichord underwent a resurgence in popularity due to renewed interest in vintage electronic instruments. A new model, the OM-108, was released in 2024.

== Production ==
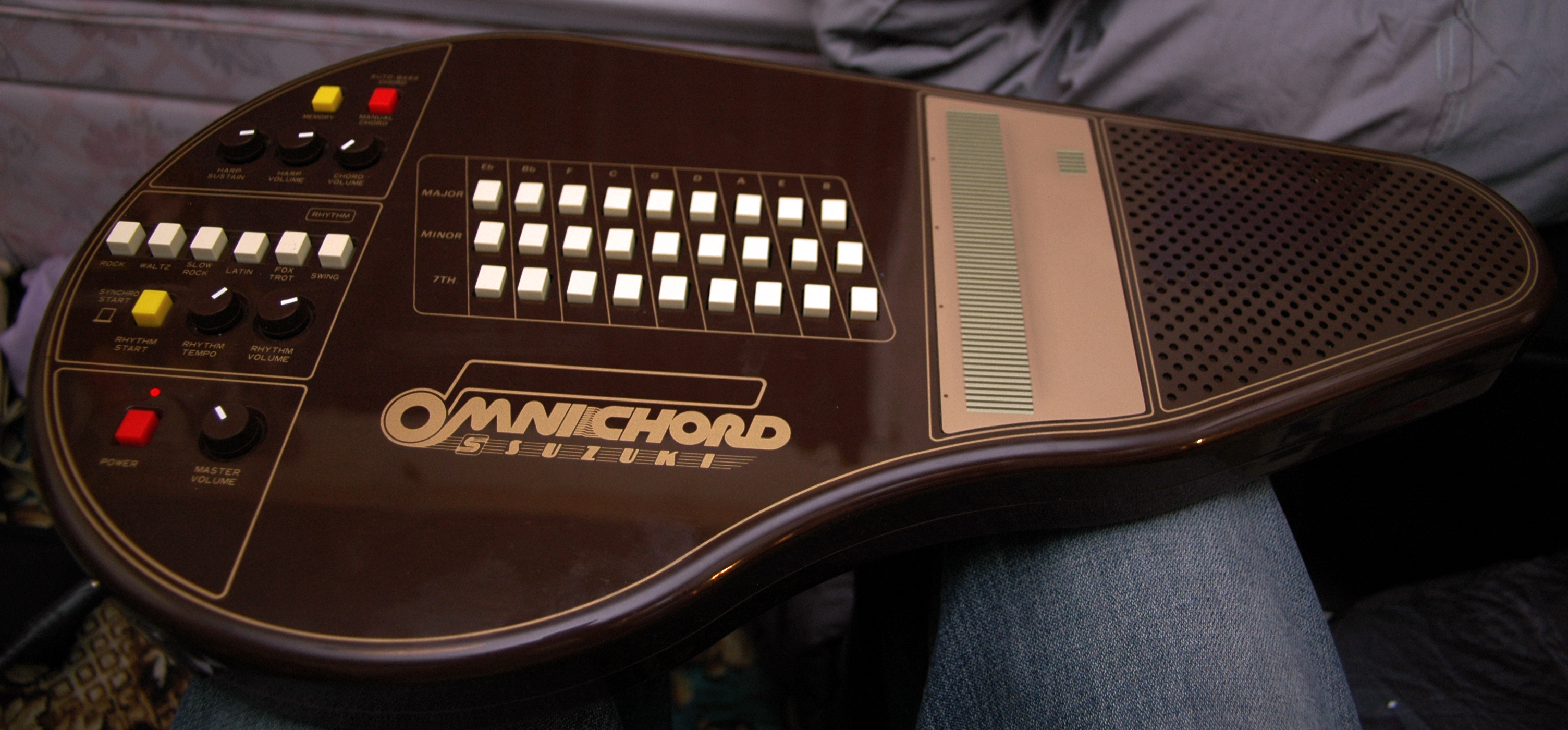
Omnichord OM-27

The Suzuki Musical Instrument Corporation released the first Omnichord, the OM-27, in 1981, alongside another instrument, the Tronichord (also known as the Portachord). It was aimed at people without musical experience who might be intimidated by traditional keyboard instruments.

The OM-27 featured 27 chord buttons, a strum plate, preset drum machine rhythms, controls for volume, tempo and sustain. It featured only one sound, "harp". In 1984, Suzuki released the OM-36, with 36 chord shapes, and the OM-84, with 84 chord shapes, both with an improved strum plate.

The next model, OM-100, repositioned the strum plate to make it more comfortable to play, and added guitar, piano, banjo, jazz organ, flute, chime, brass, vibraphone and synthesizer sounds. The OM-250, introduced in 1989, added a MIDI out port to enable connectivity with other electronic instruments. The OM-300, released in the early 1990s, added a MIDI in port, a chord sequencer, and different sounds. In 1999, the Suzuki rereleased the Omnichord as the Q-Chord, with a redesigned body, additional sounds, an improved speaker, and an expansion slot for song storage.

Around the 2020s, interest in the Omnichord grew with the rise in experimental music genres and interest in older electronic instruments. In 2024, Suzuki announced a new model, the OM-108, with analogue circuitry, emulations of previous models, new sounds and drum presets, and the ability to play the chord buttons like a keyboard or drum pad.

== Sound and features ==
Strum plate arpeggios
The 'Sonic Strings' on the Omnichord OM36, played by holding down a chord button and strumming the touchplate

Chord button chords
The chords from the Omnichord OM84

Rhythm and auto-bass
The Rock 1 rhythm and auto bass patterns from the OM36 Omnichord

Omnichords feature preset rhythm patterns with tempo and volume control, as well as an auto-bass line feature, which the player can combine to use as a musical accompaniment. The Omnichord's most unique feature is the Sonic Strings strum plate, that allows the player to 'strum' arpeggios like a guitar. Several later models of the Omnichord added MIDI compatibility, a greater selection of sounds for the Sonic Strings, vibrato, and chord memory, called Chord Computer.

The Omnichord was primarily designed as an accompaniment instrument instead of a melody instrument, an ideal way to accompany a singer with basic rhythms and the ability to easily play chords with little music theory knowledge.

The Omnichord has three main sound generators:

- A percussion section that plays rock, waltz, slow rock, Latin, foxtrot and swing rhythms, with adjustable tempo and volume.
- A chord generator providing different triad and seventh chords, either as organ-like chords or walking bass. The original OM-27 was only capable of playing 27 different chords, but later models allow 84 different chords.
- A Sonic Strings section producing an arpeggio or isolated notes from a chosen chord over a 4-octave span, played using the touch strip. The notes played on the touch strip are always in tune with the chord button currently selected. Later models featured a selection of different voices for the Sonic Strings, including vibes, brass, organ, guitar and banjo.

Later models feature a chord sequencer that allows the user to record up to 51 chords in sequence and play them back automatically or via a footswitch. In 2023, Pitchfork wrote that the Omnichord "feels like a toy", with "cheap" sounds.

== Users ==
The Omnichord's ease of use regardless of musical ability or music theory knowledge of made it popular with a range of users. It was particularly popular in Japan, where it was used in pop and electronic music, advertisements for products such as Coca-Cola and the Walkman, and in music education to create backing tracks for students to play to.

The Omnichord was used by 1980s and 1990s pop acts including the Human League, Talking Heads and Devo. Eurythmics used the Omnichord harp sound on their 1982 single "Love Is a Stranger". Brian Eno and Daniel Lanois used a slowed-down recording of an Omnichord on "Deep Blue Day" from the 1983 album Apollo: Atmospheres and Soundtracks to create a "beautiful, deep, jukebox sound". Lanois also used an Omnichord on the U2 song "Trip Through Your Wires" from the 1987 album The Joshua Tree, processed with delay effects and guitar amplifiers. Tiny Tim used the Omnichord on his 1985 single "She Left Me With the Herpes" and its B-side, "Santa Claus Has Got the AIDS This Year". The record sleeve claimed it was "the first recording ever played entirely on the Suzuki Omnichord".

David Bowie used an Omnichord in his performance of the 1968 Simon & Garfunkel song "America" at the 2001 Concert for New York City. Damon Albarn used the Omnichord OM-300's "Rock 1" preset for the 2001 Gorillaz single "Clint Eastwood". Meshell Ndegeocello used an Omnichord to compose her 2023 album The Omnichord Real Book. At the 66th Annual Grammy Awards, it became the first winner of the Grammy Award for Best Alternative Jazz Album. Other users include Jim James, Nick Rhodes and Joni Mitchell. At the 1 January 2026 inauguration of the New York City mayor Zohran Mamdani, the singer Lucy Dacus performed the political song "Bread and Roses" accompanied by Omnichord.
