= Christian Friedrich Ludwig Buschmann =

German musical instrument maker (1805–1864)

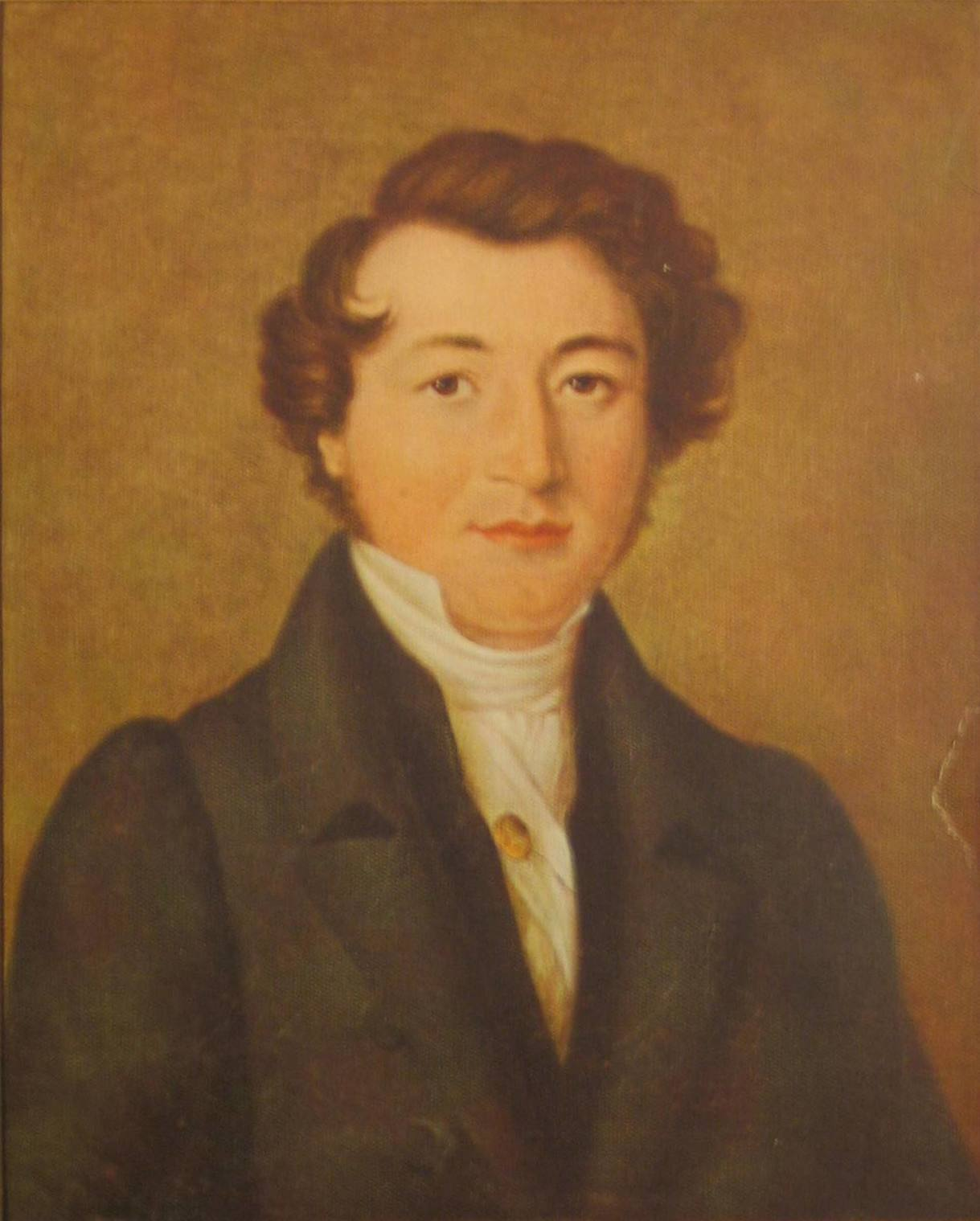
- Born: 17 June 1805
- Died: 1 October 1864 (aged 59)
- Occupations: Musical instrument maker, inventor

Christian Friedrich Ludwig Buschmann (17 June 1805 – 1 October 1864) was a German musical instrument maker and inventor, often credited with inventing the harmonica and also the accordion.

== Biography ==
=== Thuringia ===
Buschmann was born in Friedrichroda, Thuringia. His father, Johann Buschmann, was a passementier, who later started to fix musical Instruments and in 1816 developed the uranion later called terpodion, a friction instrument played with a piano-like keyboard, based on the same principle as the glass harmonica. From 1819 Johann took Friedrich with him on his frequent journeys.

=== Berlin ===
In the first half of 1821 Johann Buschmann travelled to London, accompanied by his son Friedrich, and agreed to a £1,000 contract with a Mr. Löschmann besides taking other orders for terpodions. On their return the Buschmanns set up a workshop in Berlin, Eduard did stay in Berlin and Friedrich was on a tour through Germany up to 1829 or even a bit longer. He was already skilled and experienced enough at musical instrument construction to begin building terpodions and aeolins as the letters written by him and his Father make clear. The first evidence of the word Aeoline we find in a letter dated 28 December 1828.

Altogether, 25 terpodions were built, most of them by Friedrich. His brother Eduard worked mainly on the wooden cases and inlays, and was in charge of the appearance of the instruments, though the brothers lived and worked in different German cities. Nearly all the terpodions ever built are still in existence in different European museums.

Johann and Friedrich meanwhile continued their advertising journeys throughout Europe. Besides their performances, they had to service the instruments they had already sold, as they did not function very reliably over a longer period. This may well have been a principal reason why Friedrich was looking for other methods of reliable sound generation for tuning purposes.

== On Tour ==
Mentioned towns or Villages while on Tour, are:

Aachen, Barmen, Elberfeld (which today are part of Wuppertal), Lüdenscheid, Werben, Altena, Breckerfeld, Vörde, Langenberge, Düsseldorf, Köln, Preuß-Minden and Rinteln. While still in Vörde near Barmen and on tour with his Father in 1828 Friedrich built an instrument, originally intended only for use as accompanying instrument, which at first consisted of 21 different metal free reeds fastened to a wooden block in such a way that it was possible to blow the reeds individually. He fastening the reeds inside a small box "4 inches square and equally high" (in other words a cubic box with 4" sides), each of which could be made to vibrate by blowing through 21 individual "tone chambers" (Tonlochkanzellen). This instrument he named an aeoline.

The earliest experiments with the aeoline may have taken place in 1824, when it has been claimed that Buschmann built a tuning aid named an aura, about 4 inches long and equipped with 15 reed tongues. (The name Aura was also then in use in German to mean a jaw harp). But no written evidence can be found to support this.

While still in Rinteln, in Buschmann's letters to his sun Eduard, it appears that Friedrich built a bigger version of an aeoline in 1829, with bellows and piano keyboard of two octaves, which, being about the size of a small writing desk, was still much smaller than any comparable fixed key instrument they had built previously.

It is certain that they must have become aware of all kinds of modern developments in this area as they travelled through different countries, which contributed to Friedrich's further refinement of the physharmonica.

The Buschmanns knew of an instrument built at about this time by Johann Caspar Schlimbach, an instrument maker trained in Vienna, and his cousin Bernhard Eschenbach in Königshofen in Bavaria: this was a pianoforte with an aeoline register. Schlimbach made no attempt to protect his invention, but freely showed the instrument to everyone who wanted to see it, with the inevitable result that a number of people patented very similar instruments in Vienna. Indeed, Buschmann's father Johann wrote in a letter of 30 October 1829 that he was thinking of taking out a patent for the new instrument in Bavaria.

=== Hamburg ===
In 1833 Friedrich Buschmann married Sophie Volkmar. Her brother Gustav Hermann Joseph Philipp Volkmar was a well known music theoretician in Germany and later in Switzerland. The Family and her Father Adam Valentin Volkmar lived in Rinteln from 1917 on. Friedrich and Sophie moved to Hamburg, where he opened a new workshop of his own. There he made mostly physharmonicas, bellows-operated wind instruments, each of which also had a large manual keyboard. For a physharmonica with built-in terpodion he won the Great Gold Medal at the Hamburg Arts and Trades Exhibition of 1838. Terpodions, tuningadds and pianofortes ware also built. He died in Hamburg in 1864.

== The harmonica ==
There is a persistent legend that Buschmann invented the harmonica (and the accordion) but this cannot be substantiated. Buschmann states in a letter of 1828 that he had just invented a new instrument, but the manufacture of harmonicas had begun some years previously in Vienna: "There is documentary evidence that harmonicas were being sold in Vienna in 1825..."

Nor, in his impressively well-documented family history, was Buschmann able to confirm the story (see Sources).

== See also ==
- Anton Reinlein
- Anton Haeckl
