= Tronichord =

Electronic musical instrument

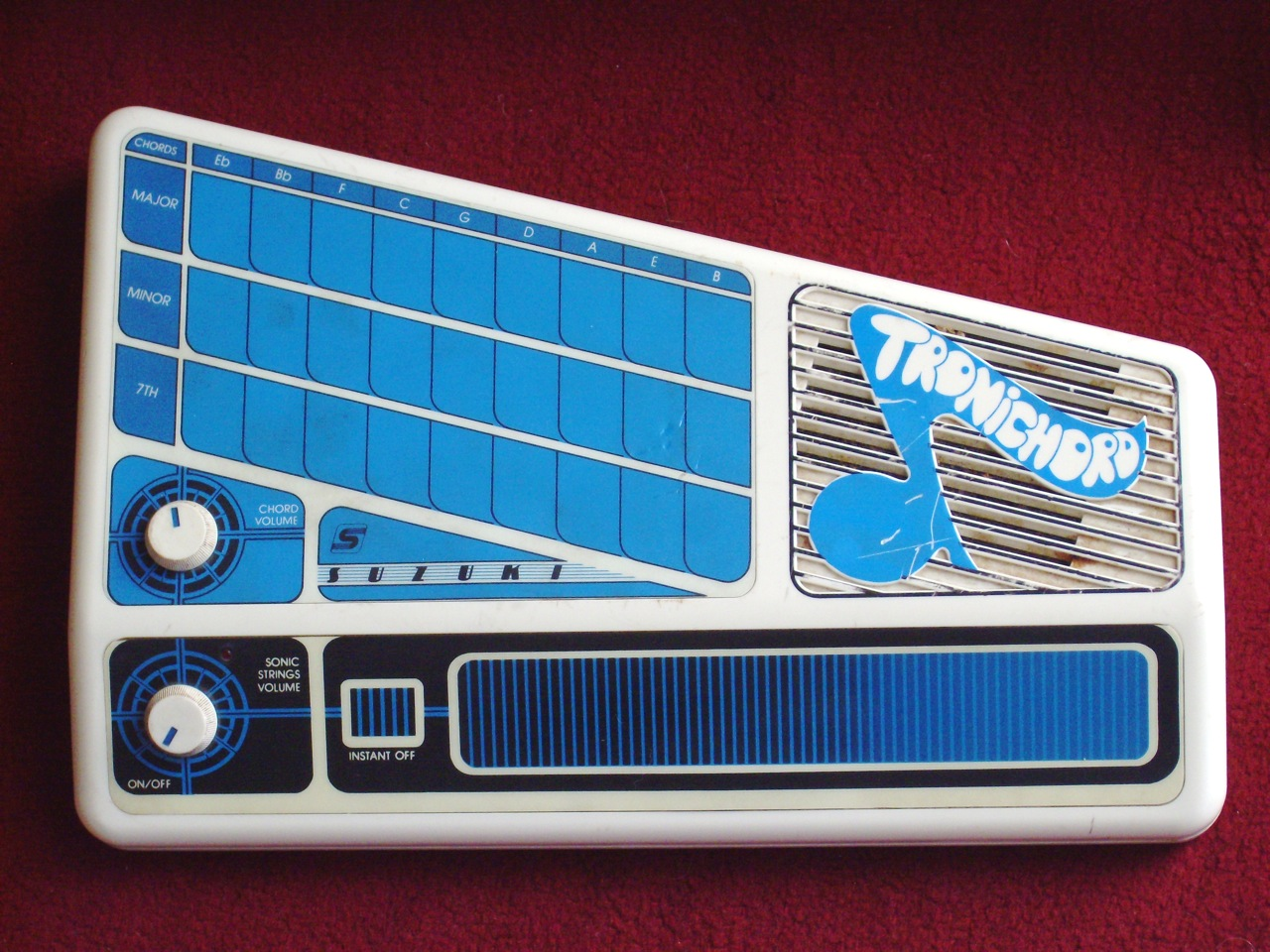
A 1981–1985 Tronichord

The Tronichord, also known as the Portachord, is a rare electronic musical instrument manufactured by Suzuki Musical Instrument Corporation of Japan in 1981-1985 A precursor to the larger and more complex Omnichord and Q-chord series of instruments by the same maker, the Tronichord was designed in large part for ease of use. The packaging included the slogan, "Sound like a pro—make music instantly, your very first time!"

The instrument is played in much the same way as an acoustic autoharp. The player touches one of a set of touch-sensitive areas on the unit's front plate to select a chord, which then sounds as a drone with level set according to the "Chord Volume" knob on the left side.

Sweeping a finger along the touch-sensitive strip along the bottom edge strums notes from the currently-selected chord. The volume of the strumming is set using the "Sonic Strings Volume" knob at the lower left. This knob also turns the unit on and off. The "Instant Off" touch pad silences the output until another chord is selected.

The unit is powered either by an external 12VDC adapter, or internally from eight AA batteries. Audio output is from a loudspeaker built into the case behind the "Tronichord" logo, or via a standard 1/4" jack on the left side of the unit suitable for a guitar cable. A trimpot for tuning the instrument's pitch is accessible on the rear of the unit through a recessed opening.

== Tronichord players ==
- Martin Gore of Depeche Mode played one in studio for a segment in the song "Wrong".
- Kathryn Stevenson of KSProductions has used the instrument in music-oriented therapy for developmentally disabled children and adults.
- Native Instruments's Kontakt audio sampling software includes Tronichord samples in its samples library.
