= Suzuki Musical Instrument Corporation =

Japanese manufacturer

- Native name: 鈴木楽器製作所
- Industry: Musical instruments
- Founded: 1953; 73 years ago
- Founders: Manji Suzuki
- Headquarters: Hamamatsu, Japan
- Website: suzukimusic-global.com

The Suzuki Musical Instrument Corporation (鈴木楽器製作所, Suzuki Gakki Seisakusho) is a Japanese musical instrument manufacturer. Founded in 1953 as a manufacturer of harmonicas, Suzuki later expanded to manufacturing Melodions, electronic musical instruments, and instruments for music education.

== History ==
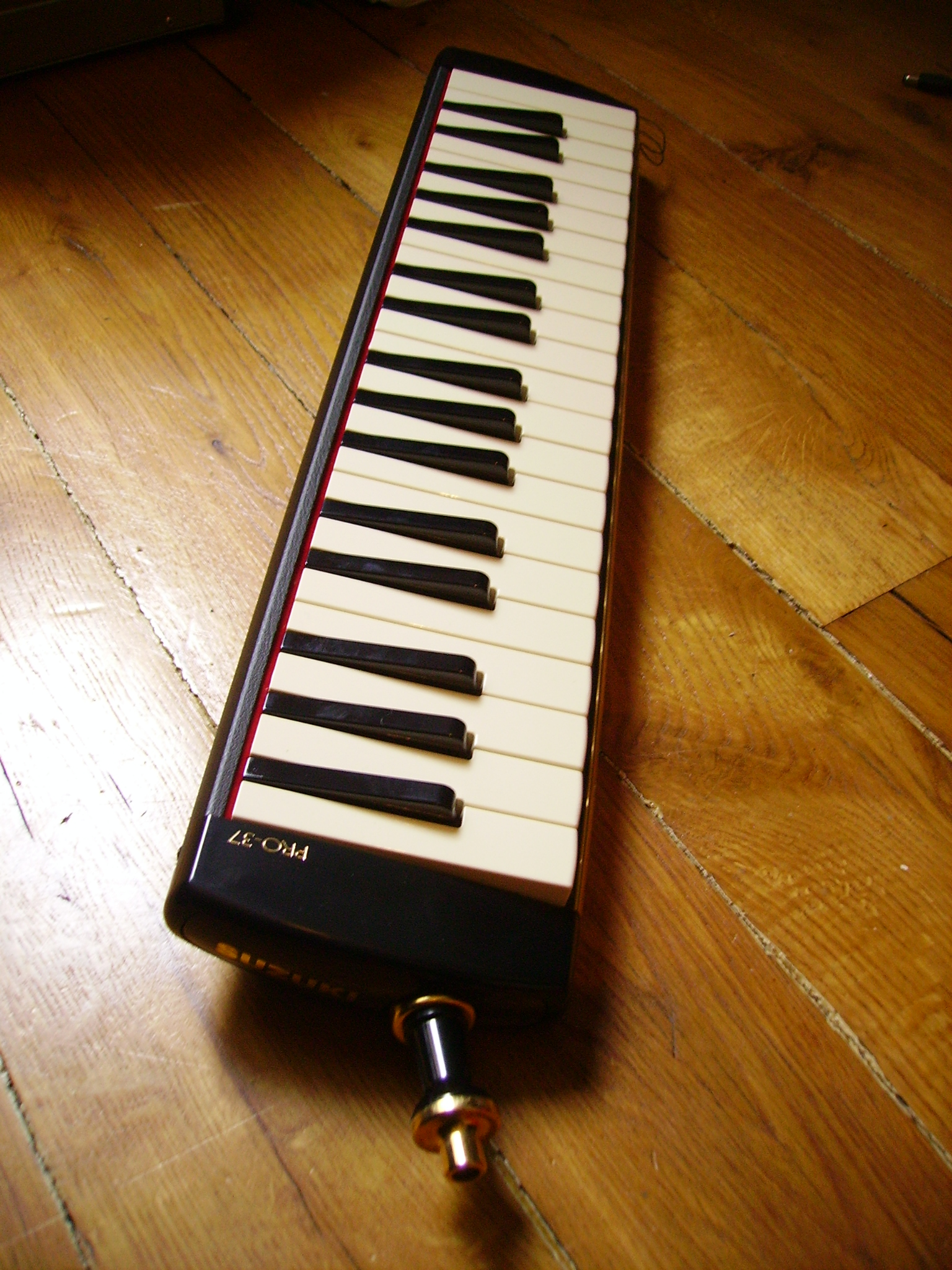
Suzuki Melodion Pro37

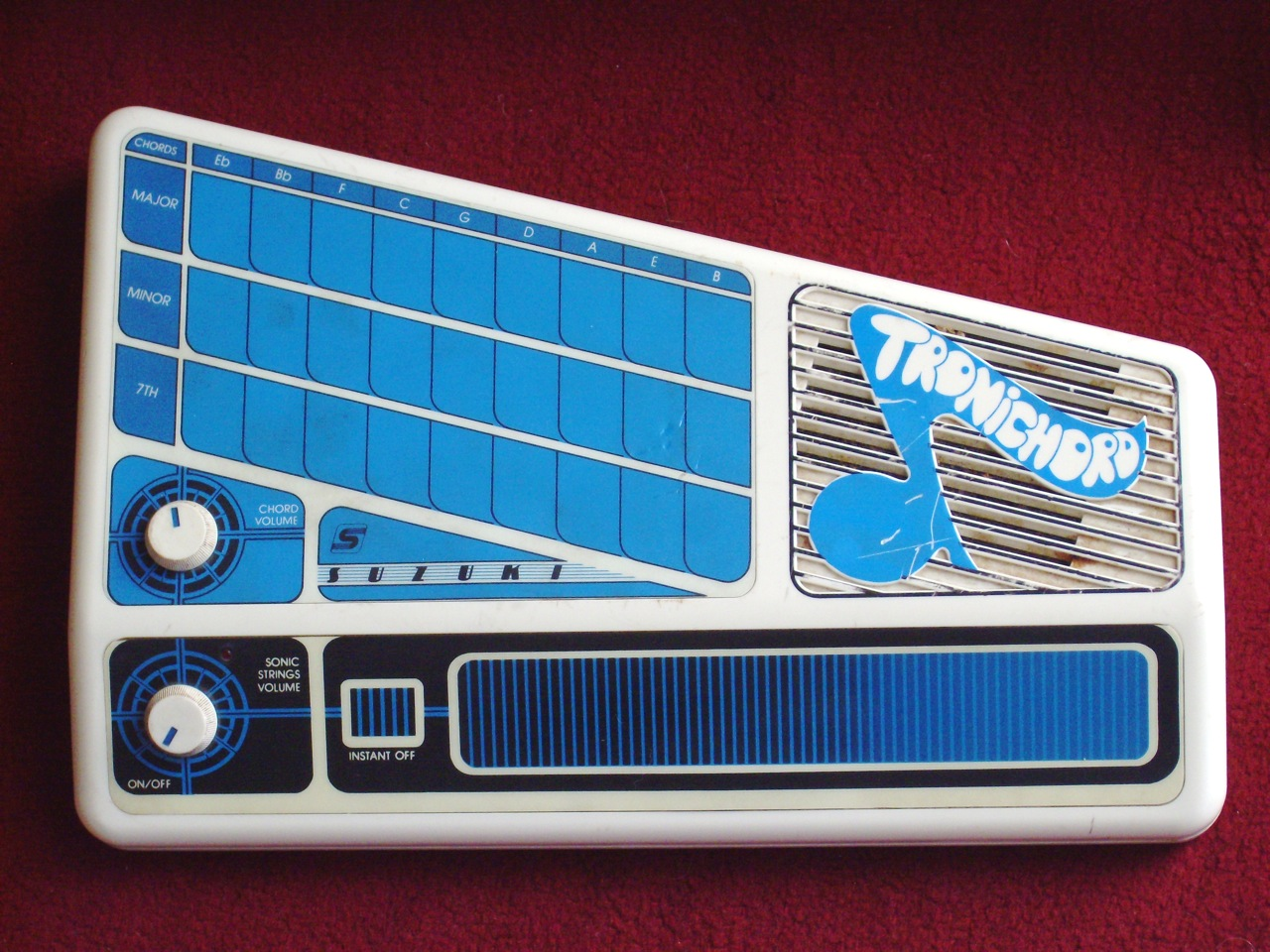
Suzuki Tronichord PC-27

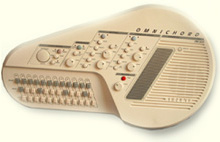
Suzuki Omnichord OM-300

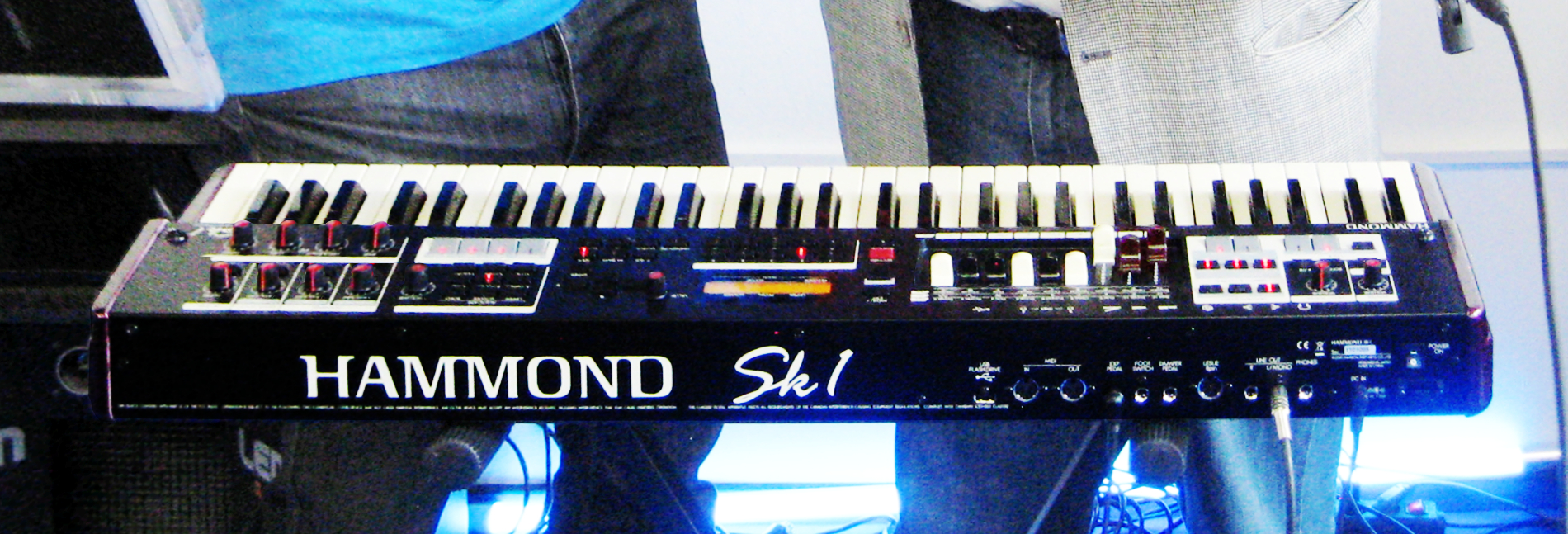
Hammond SK1

Company founder Manji Suzuki began building harmonicas and founded Suzuki Musical Instrument in 1953. In 1961 he developed the melodion which was officially adopted by the Japanese Ministry of Education for use in schools six years later.

In 1981 the company introduced the Tronichord and Omnichord electronic musical instruments.

In 1989 Suzuki bought the Hammond Organ Co.. The subsidiary, operating as Hammond Suzuki, markets electronic organs and melodions under the Hammond brand, and instrument amplifiers under the Leslie brand.

It has expanded to include a variety of instruments including digital pianos and band instruments. The company operates distribution companies in the United Kingdom (Suzuki Europe Ltd - owned by Suzuki Japan) and in the Western U.S. (in San Diego, California).

== See also ==
- Hammond organ
- Leslie speaker
