= Anton Reinlein =

Austrian clockmaker

Georg Anton Reinlein was a musical clock maker in Vienna. A patent was granted to him in the year of 1824 for improving of the Hand harmonica (Physharmonica). The Instrument had free reeds of Chinese manner and bellows that were hand operated.

== Patent ==
The official Newsletter of the Government Wiener Zeitung writes at 24 of March 1824 about this Improvements.

=== German original text ===
Se. k. k. Majestät haben mit Allerhöchster Entschließung vom 10. Februar d. J. geruht, Folgenden Privilegien zu ertheilen:

Erstens: [...]

Zweitens: Dem Anton Reinlein, bürgerl. Spieluhren-Fabrikanten, und dessen Sohn Rudolph Reinlein, zu Wien in der Vorstadt an der Wien Nr. 32, auf die >>Verbesserung in Verfertigung der Harmonika auf Chinesische Art, wornach dieselbe, obgleich das Instrument nur drey Fuß Länge, zwölf Zoll Tiefe und fünfzehn Zoll Breite habe, eine Tiefe von acht Fuß erhalte, mittelst einer Claviatur zum Spielen mit freyer Hand eingerichtet sey, den an sich starken Ton im Forte und Piano beliebig Ausdrücken, und nebst den einer Harmonika ohnehin eigenen Adgio-Stücken auf jedes Allegro mit Expression ausführen lasse; übrigens sich nie verstimme,<< ein Privilegium auf die Dauer von fünf Jahren; [...]

=== Translation of the original text ===
Exclusive Privilegium (patent).

Her Majesty did grant the following privilegium on 10. of February:

First: [...]

Second: to Anton Reinlein, "bürgerlicher" musical clock maker and his sun Rudolph Reinlein, at Vienna Address: "Vorstadt an der Wien Nr. 32", for the >>improvement of producing of the "Harmonika auf Chinesische Art", since this Instrument is only tree feet long, and twelve Inches (305 mm) in width and fifteen Inches (381 mm) deep, a deep (note) of 8-foot (2.4 m) reaches.(?) Equipped with a keyboard fifteen Inches (381 mm) in width for playing with a free hand, the sound is strong in forte and in piano ... with Expression playable, ...

(Very difficult to translate because it is old German writing.) But notice the dimensions of the instrument. One Inch (Zol) at that time in Austria was ≈ 26,34 mm. one foot = 12 Inch. 3 feet to 12-inch (300 mm) to 15-inch (380 mm) = 94 cm 31,6 cm 39,5 cm Keyboard length 39,5 cm

keeping this in mind it war a rather big instrument to keep in ones hand! So on the other side for an Instrument like chest or table it was quite small.

=== Newsletter advertisement 1816 ===
(This proves the manufacturer existed in 1816.) Advertisement about "Flötenspiele" (musical clocks). Wiener Zeitung from 23 November 1816

==== Transcription ====
Flötenspiele.

Bey G. A. Reinlein, Bürgerl. Groß- und Spieluhren-Fabrikanten an der Wien Nr. 32 sind für Musik–Freunde große und kleine Flötenspiele, Piano oder Forte spielend, im Mahony–Sekretar, auch mit der Hand zum spielen eingerichtet, worunter eines mit einem ganz besondern Ein– und Aufsatz versehen, um billige Preise zu haben.

Translation: Bey G. A. Reinlein, Bürgerl. Clock and musical clock producer ... for lovers of music big and small musical clocks playing in piano or forte, built into a mahogany table, playable with hand and mechanically ...

Comment: Notice that they could be played with different volume (piano and forte) with expression; this was only possible because he used reeds and a piano keyboard, with an automatic clock mechanism for automatic playing.

=== Newsletter advertisement 1828 ===
==== Translation ====
Advertisement for friends of music.

G.A. Reinlein and Son, Citizen und Musial - Clock–producer, and owner of a privilegium (patent) for his invention of the Aeol-Harmonika, near the theater "an der Wien Nr. 32", advertises today, that you can buy Instruments with 3 Octaves and up to 6 Octaves in range of the keyboard, one with automatic playing clock mechanism as well. Then a new invention of an extra long mouth blown Harmonicas with the range of two octaves. On this Mouth harmonica one is able to produce not only chords as it is suitable for performing all kind of music.

=== Comment ===
Notice that in 1828 they had a wide range of Instruments:

- Instruments with 3 octaves of notes - small hand Instruments
- Or bigger with up to 6 Octaves
- Automatic playing Instruments
- Normal Mouth Harmonicas, diatonic (chords)
- and new Mouth Harmonicas range two Octaves with all notes (Chromatic).

== See also ==
- Anton Haeckl
- Christian Friedrich Ludwig Buschmann
