= Danelectro Commando =

The Danelectro Commando is a combo guitar amplifier manufactured by Danelectro from 1954 to 1960. There is some evidence that it may be one of the many different amplifiers used by Little Walter.

The circuitry of this 30-watt amplifier is typical of its day, with a 5Y3 rectifier tube, one 12AX7 preamp tube, one 12AX7 for phase inversion, a 6SN7 additional gain stage, four 6V6 power tubes, and a 6SJ7 (1954-1958) or a 6AU6 (1958-1960) for the built-in vibrato unit. What makes it unique is the cabinet. Employing a "suitcase" design, it contains eight 8-inch Rola 10610 alnicos speakers wired series / parallel in two arrays one in either side of the suitcase, with the amplifier and controls located at the top and bottom of one side. The suitcase opens out so that both sides face forwards.

When closed, the amplifier is 22" × 22" x 10". It weighs 38 lbs, relatively lightweight for a valve combo amplifier.

The same amplifier was made by Danelectro under the following names: Danelectro Commando Model 88, Silvertone 1337, Montgomery Ward 35JDR8419, Montgomery Ward 55JDR8437, Montgomery Ward Airline 85GDR8518 where the first two letters of the Montgomery Ward code backwards represent the first year of design/production (but with the 35JDR8419 only being available in 1954). The schematic is readily available on the web under the name Montgomery Ward GDR 8517a.
