= Anton Haeckl =

Anton Haeckl was a musical instrument builder in Vienna, who built the first physharmonica in 1818. Two of his instruments from 1825 (refs. Inv. Nr. 19.480 (20 white keys) and Inv. Nr. 38.956) can be seen in the Vienna Technical Museum.

The physharmonica looked similar to the hand harmonium still in use in India today, with a piano-style keyboard. Smaller examples of this type of instrument rested on the left arm, and were played with the right hand. The range of notes was from B to g".

A newspaper advert of 14 April 1821 in the "Allgemeine Musikalische Zeitung" says: "The master also makes very small versions which rest comfortably on the left arm, and which the right hand plays."

A patent ("privilegium") was granted to Anton Haeckl for such instruments on 8 April 1821.

== Similar instruments ==
Similar early instruments, built in France, looked somewhat like an oversized modern piano-accordion, but were placed, like pianos, on a stand so one could use both hands on the keyboard. The bellows were operated by foot pedals and a string mechanism. The instrument had no bass section, so though it looked like an accordion it is treated as forerunner of the harmonium.

One such instrument, made by "Busson Brevete" (Paris) in 1880, can be seen in the Vienna Technical Museum (ref. Inv. Nr. 15.289).

== See also ==
- Anton Reinlein
- Christian Friedrich Ludwig Buschmann
