= Physharmonica =

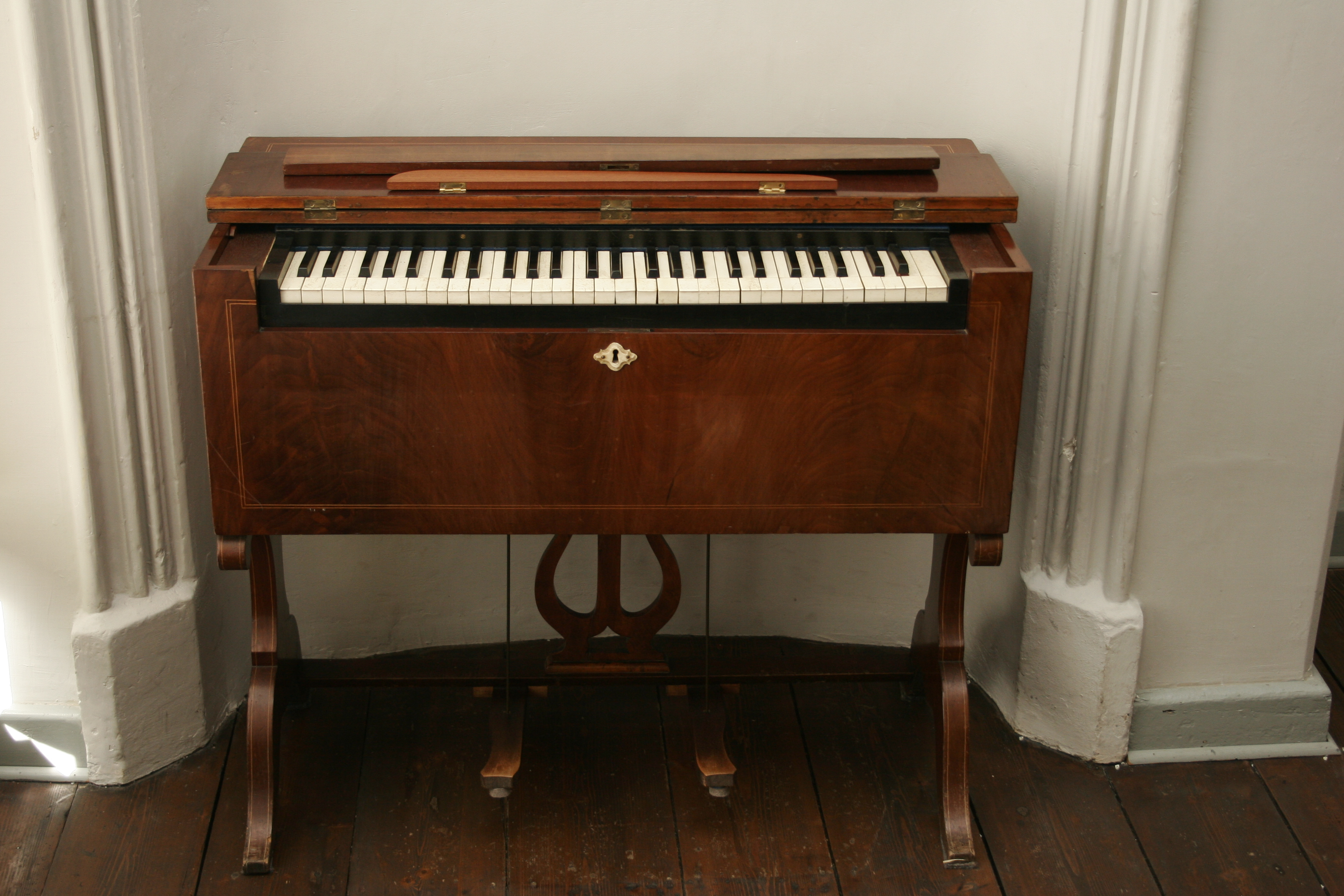
A physharmonica from the first half of the 19th century in the collection of Organeum in Weener, Germany.

The physharmonica is a keyboard instrument fitted with free reeds, a kind of harmonium much used in Germany in the early 20th century.

== Description ==
The physharmonica resembles a small harmonium, but is differentiated from it by having no stops, being without percussion action, having only a 4 octave compass, and not speaking readily or clearly. As with the harmonium, the bellows are worked by the feet by an alternate movement, which also affords a means of varying the dynamic force of the tone according as more or less energetic pedalling increases or decreases the pressure of the wind supply.

The physharmonica was invented in 1818 by Anton Haeckl, of Vienna; in the original instrument the bellows were placed right and left immediately under the shallow wind-chest, and were worked by means of pedals connected by stout wire. A specimen, having a compass of four octaves and a very sweet tone, is preserved in the collection of Paul de Wit, formerly in Leipzig, transferred to Cologne and then back to Leipzig's Grassi Museum.

A patent for improvements to this type of instrument was granted to Anton Reinlein 1824. Christian Friedrich Ludwig Buschmann also built similar instruments at least by 1828. There were also others who produced these instruments such as Johann Caspar Schlimbach with Bernhard Eschenbach, Carl Friedrich Voit in Schweinfurt and Friedrich Sturm) in Stuhl.

== See also ==
- Aeolodion
- Hammond organ
