= Ten Scenes of West Lake =

Cultural landscape in China

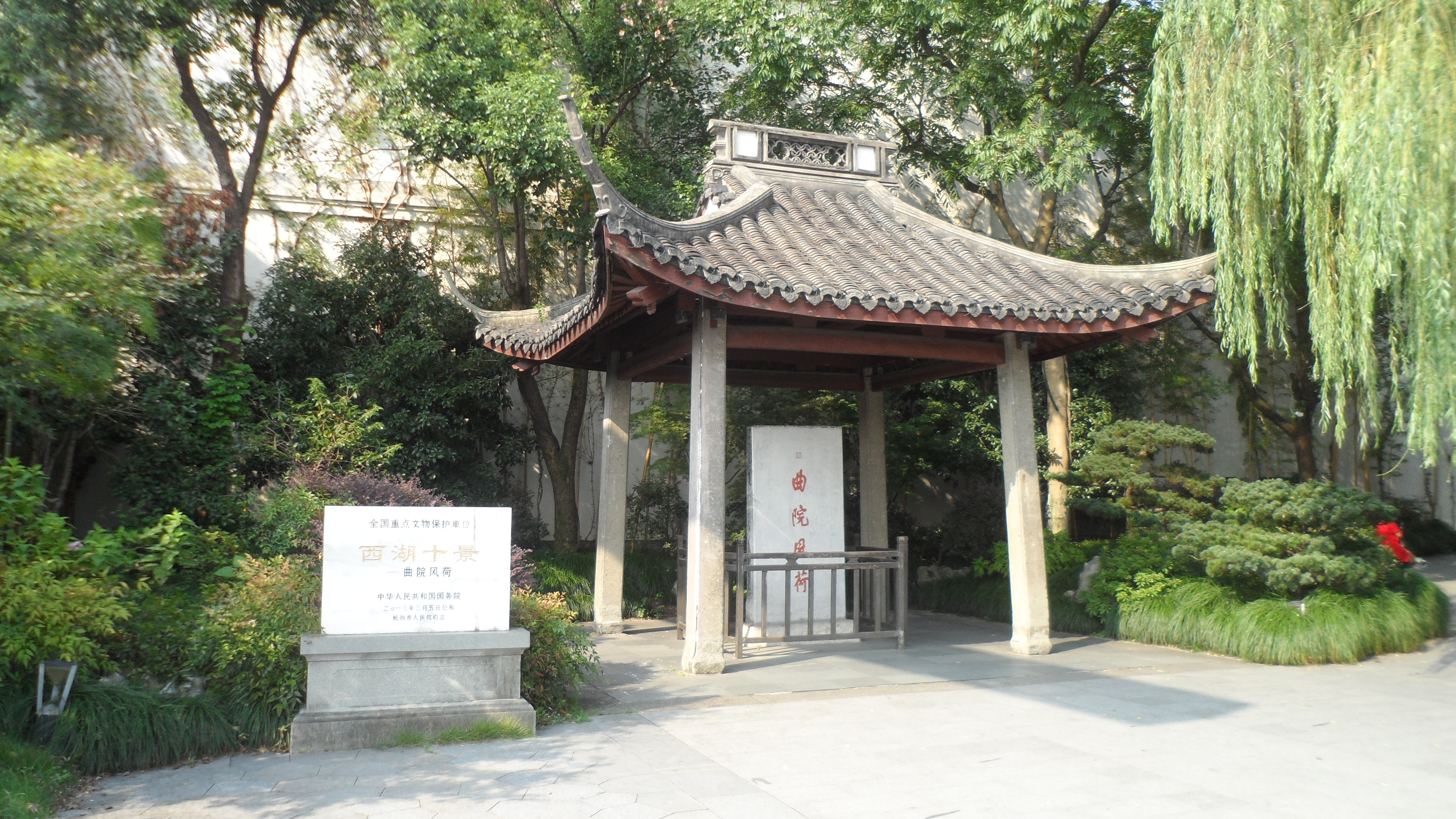
One of ten pavilions sheltering the imperial steles, established in 1699

The Ten Scenes of West Lake (Chinese: 西湖十景; pinyin: Xīhú Shí Jǐng), also known as Ten Vistas of West Lake, Ten Views of West Lake or Ten Poetically Named Scenic Places of West Lake Landscape, is a collection of ten iconic views around the West Lake in Hangzhou, China. Each of these scenic spots is traditionally named and described with a four-character Chinese phrase. Historically, the selection of the ten vistas evolved over time, eventually being standardised in 1699, when the Kangxi Emperor personally inscribed the names of the vistas, after which local authorities engraved stelae and built pavilions to house each inscribed stone. The poetically named scenic places symbolise the ethos of "harmony of humankind and nature" in traditional Chinese landscape design.

== History ==
=== Early history ===
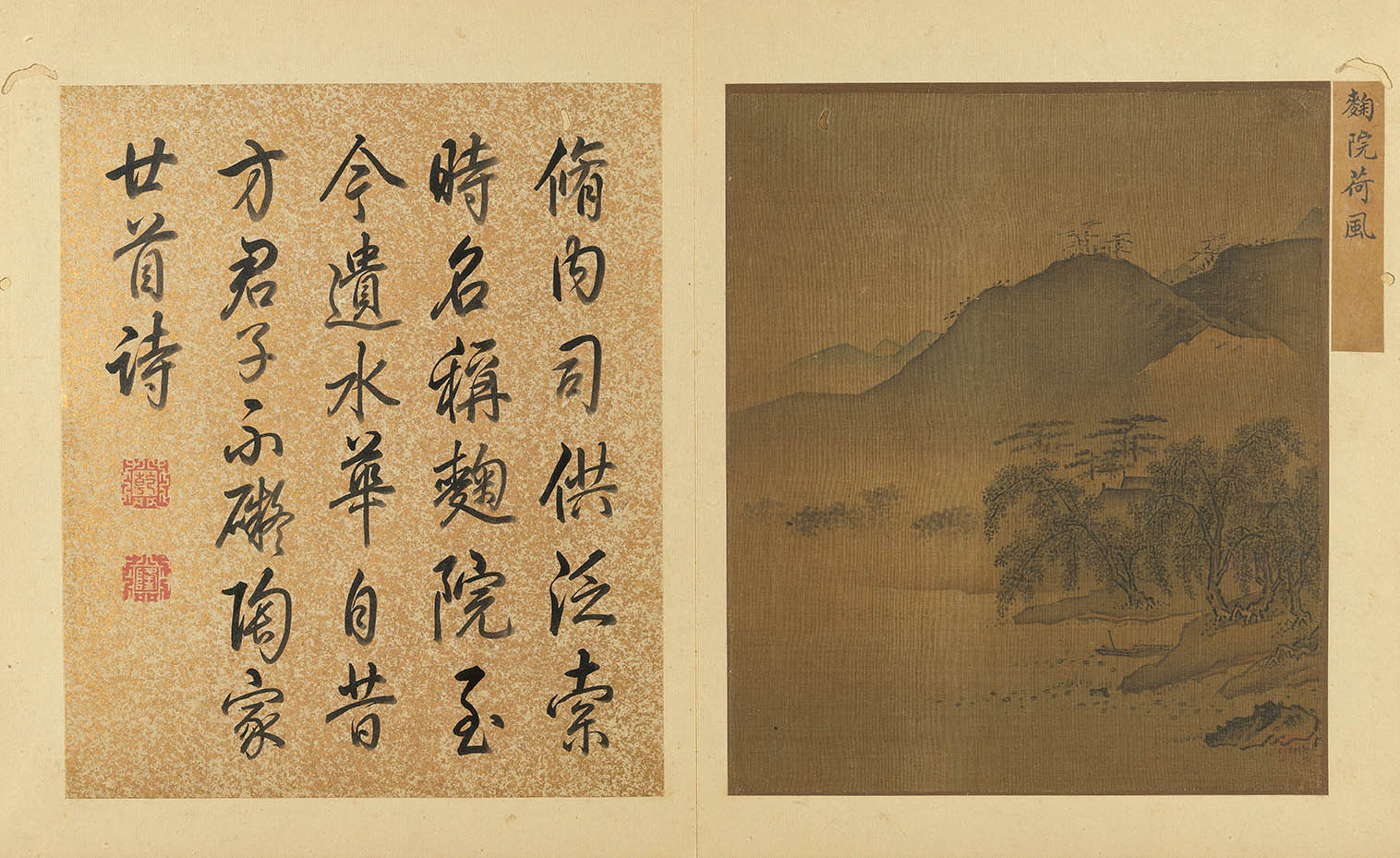
Ten Scenes Around the West Lake by Ye Xiaoyan in the 13th century

Before the concept of "Ten Scenes of West Lake", Song Di, who achieved first place in the imperial examination during 1023–1032, named the Eight Views of Xiaoxiang, using four-character phrases. This earlier work may have inspired the idea of the Ten Scenes of the West Lake.The earliest known literary reference to the Ten Scenes of West Lake was made by Zhu Mu in his Topographical Guide to Touring Sites of Scenic Beauty. (Note: simplified Chinese: 祝穆《方舆胜览》; traditional Chinese: 祝穆《方輿勝覽》) Zhu wrote,

People who were fond of things used to name [the scenery] using ten titles: Autumn Moon above the Placid Lake, Spring Dawn at Su Dike, Remnant Snow on Broken Bridge, Sunset on Leifeng Pagoda, Evening Bell from Nanping Hill, Lotus Breeze at Qu Winery, Watching Fish at Flower Cove, Listening to the Orioles by the Willow Ripples, Three Stupas and the Reflecting Moon, and Twin Peaks Piercing the Clouds.

As the nomenclature was typical to Chinese painters, Zhai Hao (1765) (Note: Chinese: 翟灝《湖山便览》) suggests that artistic depictions of the Ten Scenes may have existed before Zhu Mu's mention. In a 1268 map, the names of the Ten Scenes appeared, along with 400 other famous sites. Ye Xiaoyan, a Hangzhou-born painter active in the early 13th century, painted the Ten Scenes Around the West Lake. (Note: simplified Chinese: 叶肖岩《西湖十景图》; traditional Chinese: 葉肖巖《西湖十景圖》) As Wu Zimu (1274) wrote, (Note: simplified Chinese: 吴自牧《梦粱录》; traditional Chinese: 吳自牧《夢粱錄》)

In recent times the ten most spectacular scenes of the four seasons around West Lake and its mountains have been illustrated by painters.

Based on paintings and poems in the age of Zhu Mu, the notion of Ten Scenes could have been invented in the 1250s or 1260s. It was during the time, the dynastic capital of Song moved to Hangzhou, as a result of the Jurchen conquest of northern China. Despite the fall of the Chinese empire due to threats from alien invaders, local people shifted their interest from the central government and its needs to their own communities which they were proud about, which led to growing interest in the tourism to the West Lake. By the Ming dynasty (1368–1644), the West Lake had been regarded the best retreat from bureaucratic duties and family pressures. Zhang Dai, a famous essayist during the Ming-Qing transition (1618–1683), wrote ten poems about the Ten Scenes of West Lake, but he did not further mention the scenes, nor detailedly describe the lake.

=== Qing dynasty ===
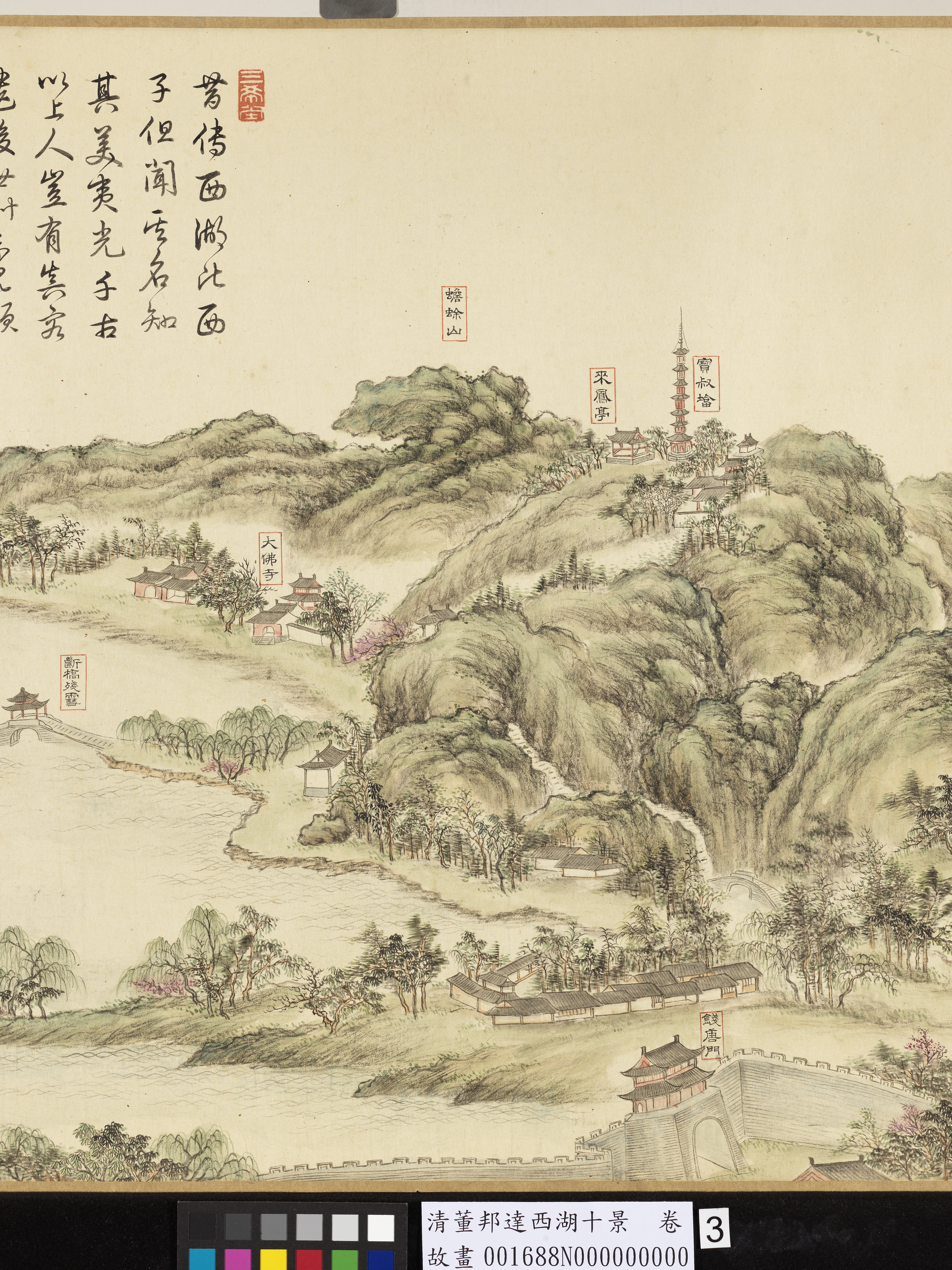
Ten Scenes from the West Lake, painted by Dong Bangda in 1750

During the Manchu-led Qing dynasty, emperors frequently visited the southern China, showcasing their possession over China, during which the Kangxi emperor highlighted the somewhat-neglected traditional notion of the Ten Scenes of West Lake. In 1699, Kangxi inscribed the Ten Scenes, which were engraved on stone with pavilions sheltering it by the local government. The names of the Ten Scenes was thus standardised. The Qianlong emperor further added his poems to the back of each stone, popularising the notion. Qianlong visited Hangzhou for six times. Each time he visited, he wrote new poems for the Ten Scenes of West Lake. Craftsmen had to smooth out the previous verses to accommodate all the poems on the stele again.

In his version, Kangxi renamed the view at Quyuan from "Breeze of Lotus" to "Breeze-ruffled Lotus" to highlight the lotus. It was widely believed that the emperor mistakenly wrote the name of Quyuan, which originally refers to the former royal brewery (麯院), as the winding courtyard (曲院). The two phrases had the same pronunciation but distinct meanings. As a result, the Qianlong emperor wrote a poem on the back of Kangxi's inscription, claiming that there was no mistake as Kangxi, his grandfather, hoped to abstain from drinking like a saint. Therefore, Quyuan is often translated as the Crooked Courtyard, the Winding Garden, or the Brewing Courtyard.

=== Modern era ===
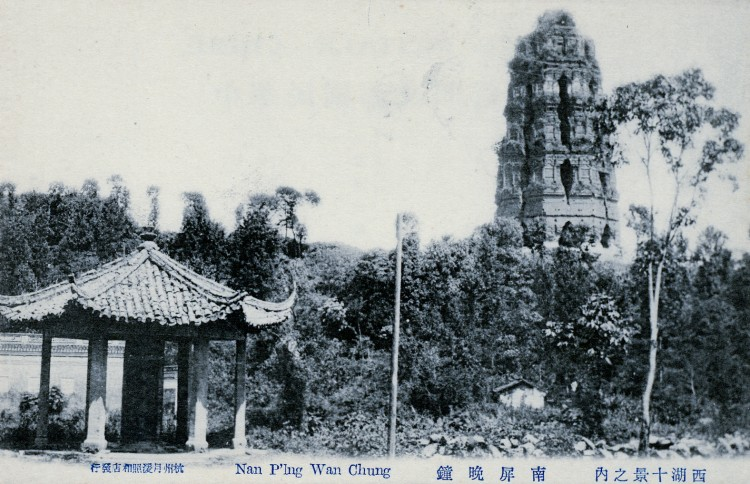
Leifeng Pagoda in 1910

In 1924, the collapse of Leifeng Pagoda drew significant attention across China, with growing appeal for rebuilding the tower, so as to restore the Ten Scenes of West Lake. Lu Xun, one of the most influential Chinese writers, wrote sarcastically,

Many of us in China … have a sort of “ten views syndrome” or at least an “eight views syndrome,” which reached epidemic proportions in the Qing dynasty, I should say. Look through any county annals, and you will find the district has ten sights, if not eight, such as “Moonlight on a Distant Village,” “Quiet Monastery and Clear Bell,” “Ancient Pool and Crystal Water.”

During the Cultural Revolution (1966–1976), nine of the ten imperial inscriptions of the Ten Scenes were smashed by Red Guards. Only the inscriptions for "Spring Dawn at Su Causeway" and "Breeze-ruffled Lotus at Quyuan Garden" were preserved. The former was smashed into three pieces by the Red Guards and sunk into the lake, while the latter was completely submerged by officials in charge. After the Cultural Revolution, these inscriptions were recovered. The other eight were restored based on stone rubbing of the original inscriptions.

in 1984–85, a new set of Ten Scenes was selected, as sponsored by Hangzhou Daily, the West Lake Parks and Gardens Bureau, and a number of local companies, which was announced in 1986. After popular nomination and expert consultation since 2002, a new list of Ten Scenes were announced in 2007. These two versions, however, were not as popular as the traditional version.

== Traditional version ==
Names	Meaning	Image
苏堤春晓 Spring Dawn at Su Causeway	Views of the lake from the centre of the Su Causeway	
曲院風荷 Wind and Lotus at the Crooked Courtyard	Views of lotus on the lake at the north end of the Su Causeway during the summer	
平湖秋月 Autumn Moon over the Calm Lake	Views from the northeast of the main lake toward the three islands, with hills to the west, south, and east sides of West Lake	
斷橋殘雪 Lingering Snow on Broken Bridge	View toward the Broken Bridge at the eastern end of Bai Causeway, extending westward beyond.	
雷峰夕照 Leifeng Pagoda in Evening Glow	Leifeng Pagoda, or the Leifeng Hill where the pagoda stands, in the sunset	
三潭印月 Three Ponds Mirroring the Moon	Three stone pagodas near the artificial island of Little Yingzhou, with lanterns that reflect on the lake's surface alongside the moonlight	
柳浪聞鶯 Orioles Singing in the Willows	Originally a royal garden of the Song dynasty, a park filled with willows swaying in the wind and bird songs	
雙峰插雲 Twin Peaks Piercing the Clouds	On rainy or misty days, parts of the South and North Peaks seem to emerge and disappear within the clouds, with their tops still visible above the mist	
花港觀魚 Viewing Fish at Flower Pond	Views of ponds with goldfish in a floral garden between the Small South Lake and Inner West Lake in the west.	
南屏晚鐘 Evening Bell Ringing on Nanping Hill	The sound of bells at the Jingci Temple at the Nanping Hill.	

== Other versions ==
=== 1986 version ===
Chinese name	English translation	Image
云栖竹径	Bamboo Path at Yunqi	
满陇桂雨	Sweet Osmanthus Rain at Manjuelong Village	
虎跑梦泉	Dreaming of Tiger Spring at Hupao Valley	
龙井问茶	Inquiring about Tea at Dragon Well	
九溪烟树	Nine Creeks Meandering Through a Misty Forest	
吴山天风	Heavenly Wind over Wu Hill	
阮墩环碧	Ruan Gong Islet Submerged in Greenery	
黄龙吐翠	Yellow Dragon Cave Dressed in Green	
玉皇飞云	Clouds Scurrying over Jade Emperor Hill	
宝石流霞	Precious Stone Hill Floating in Rosy Clouds	

=== 2007 version ===
Chinese name	English translation	Image
灵隐禅踪	Zen Retreat at Lingyin Temple	
六和听涛	Listening to the Tidal Roar at Six Harmonies	
岳墓栖霞	General Yue’s Tomb at Cloud-Lingering Hill	
湖滨晴雨	Sunny and Rainy Views from the Lakeside	
钱祠表忠	Loyalty Displayed at the Qian Temple	
万松书缘	A Love Legend at Wansong Academy	
杨堤景行	Historical Reflections on Governor Yang Causeway	
三台云水	Crisscross Lakes against Cloudy Santai Hill	
梅坞春早	Early Spring at Meijiawu Tea Village	
北街梦寻	Seeking the Dreams at Historic Beishan Street	

== Related works ==
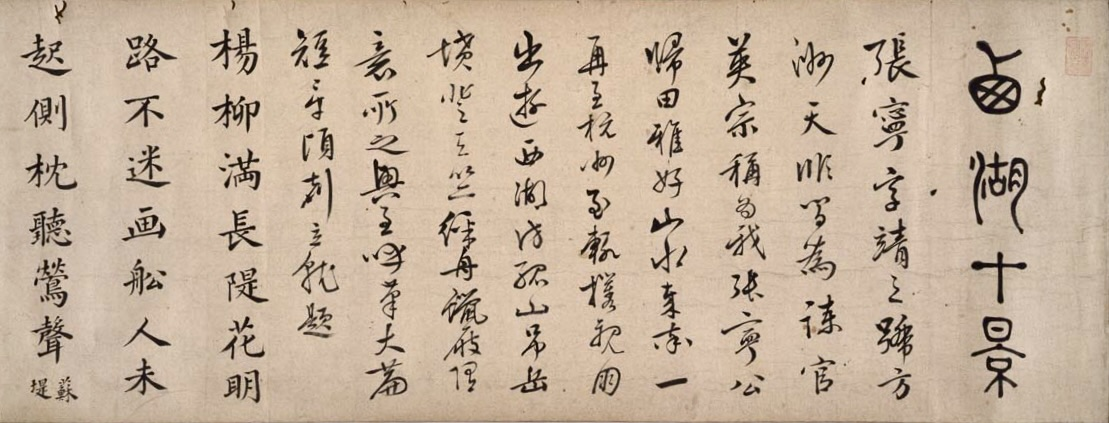
Japanese calligraphy of the Ten Scenes of West Lake in 1720

=== Paintings ===
- Ten Scenes Around West Lake, painted by Ye Xiaoyan in the early 13th century, deposited at National Palace Museum
- Ten Scenes of West Lake, painted by Wang Yuanqi between 1708 and 1715, deposited at Liaoing Provincial Museum
- Ten Scenes from the West Lake, painted by Dong Bangda in 1750, deposited at National Palace Museum

=== Calligraphy ===
- Ten Views of West Lake, written by Hosoi Kōtaku in 1720, deposited at Tokyo National Museum
- The Imperial Stele of Ten Scenes of West Lake, written by Kangxi and Qianlong emperors in 1699-1784, protected at ten sites around the West Lake

=== Poems and music ===
- Zhang, Dai. "The Ten Scenes of West Lake". Translated by Duncan Campbell.
- Autumn Moon Over the Calm Lake, Chinese folk song composed by Cantonese musician Lü Wencheng in the 1930s

== See also ==
- Eight Views, a traditional nomenclature of scenic places in East Asia
- Classic Chinese garden
  - Old Summer Palace
  - Summer Palace
