= Guangdong music =

Guangdong music may refer to:

- Music of Guangdong
- Guangdong music (genre), a genre of music also known as Cantonese music
