= Leifeng Pagoda =

Five story tall tower with eight sides in Hangzhou, Zhejiang, China

Coordinates: 30°14′2″N 120°8′42″E

- Aerial view of Leifeng Pagoda
- Chinese: 雷峰塔
Transcriptions
Standard Mandarin
- Hanyu Pinyin: Léifēng Tǎ

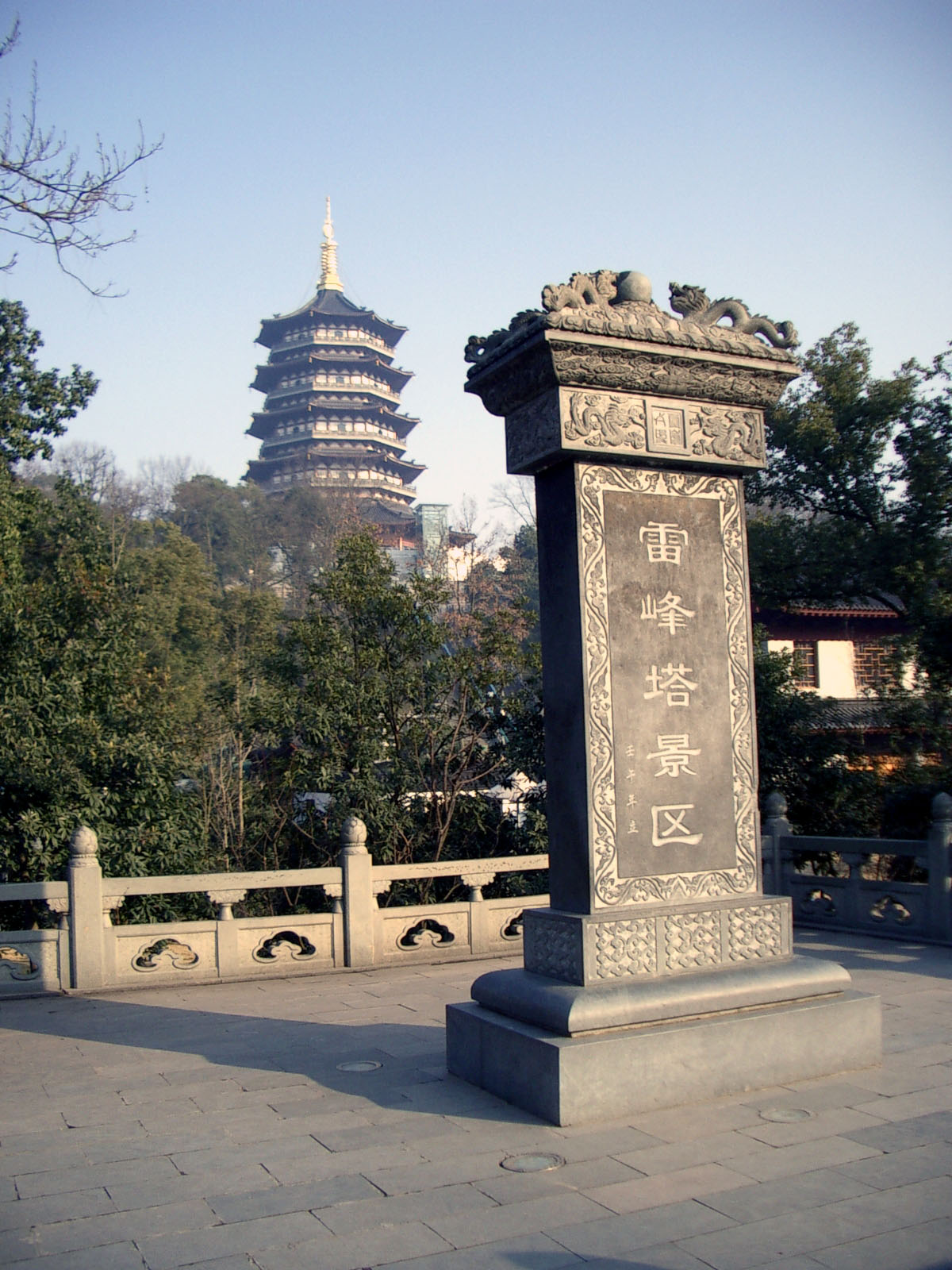
Leifeng Pagoda

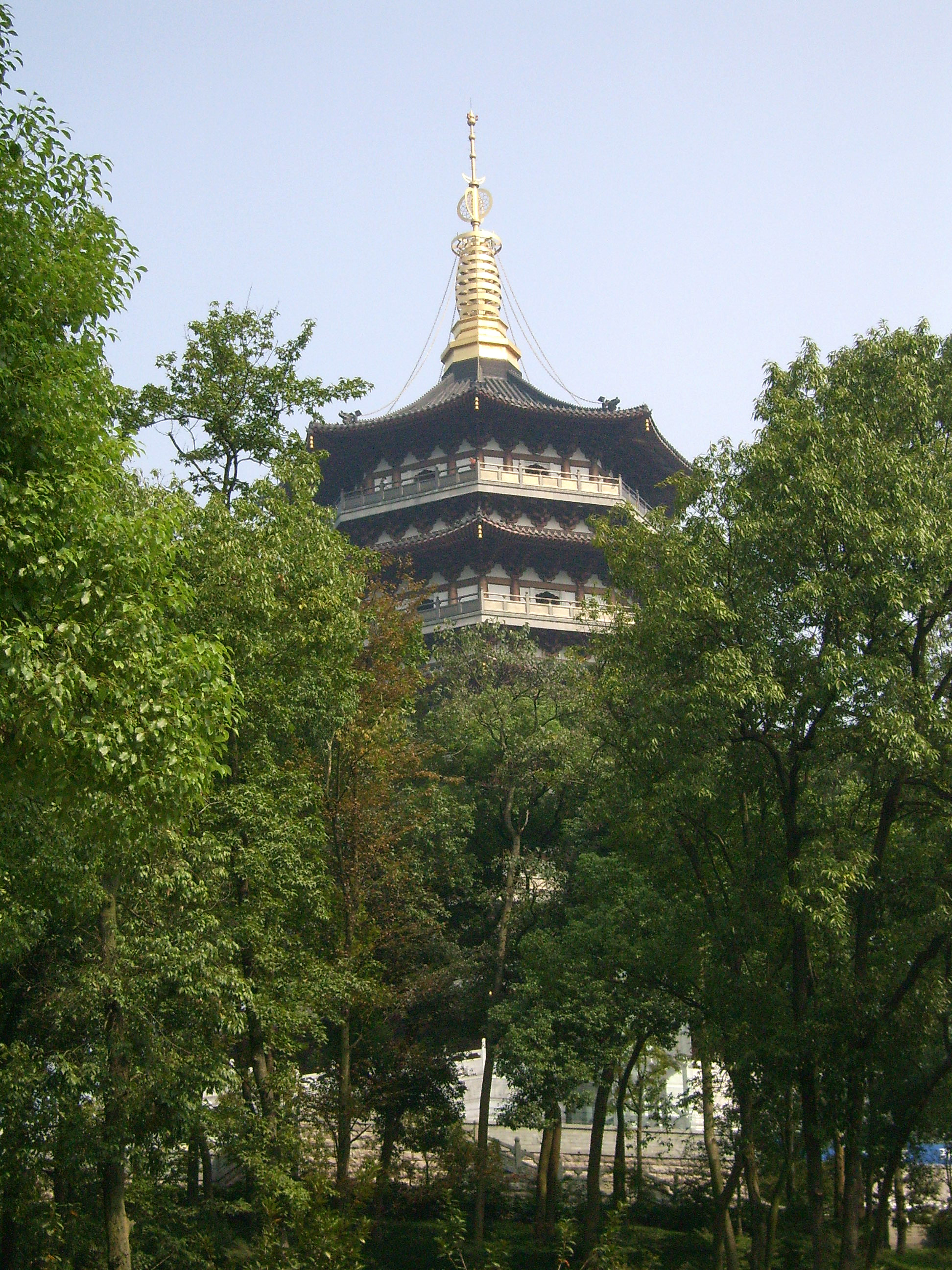
Close-up of the pagoda

Plan of Leifeng Pagoda

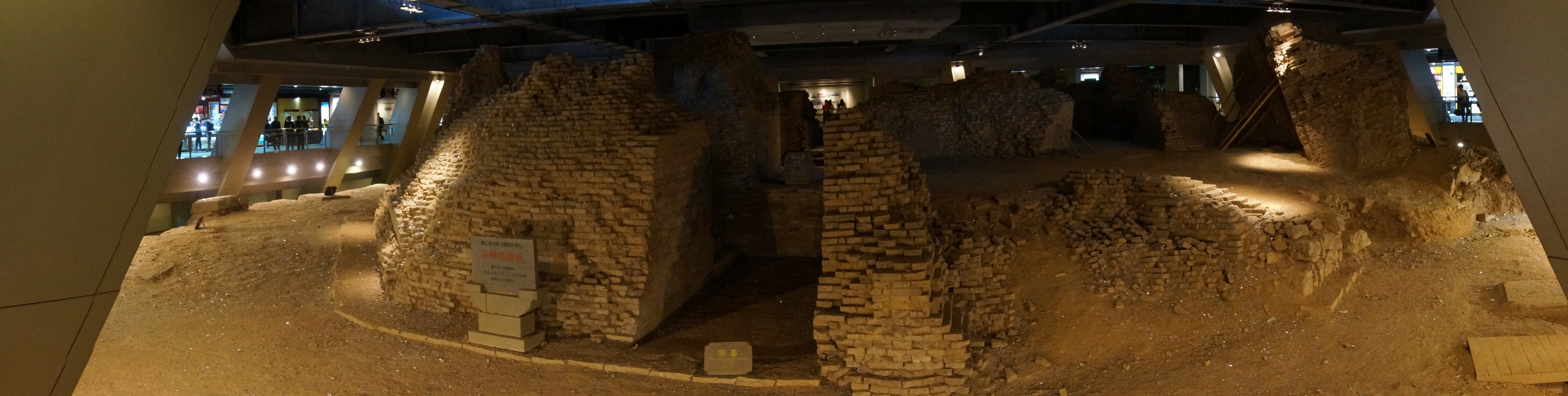
Full View of Site of Leifeng Pagoda

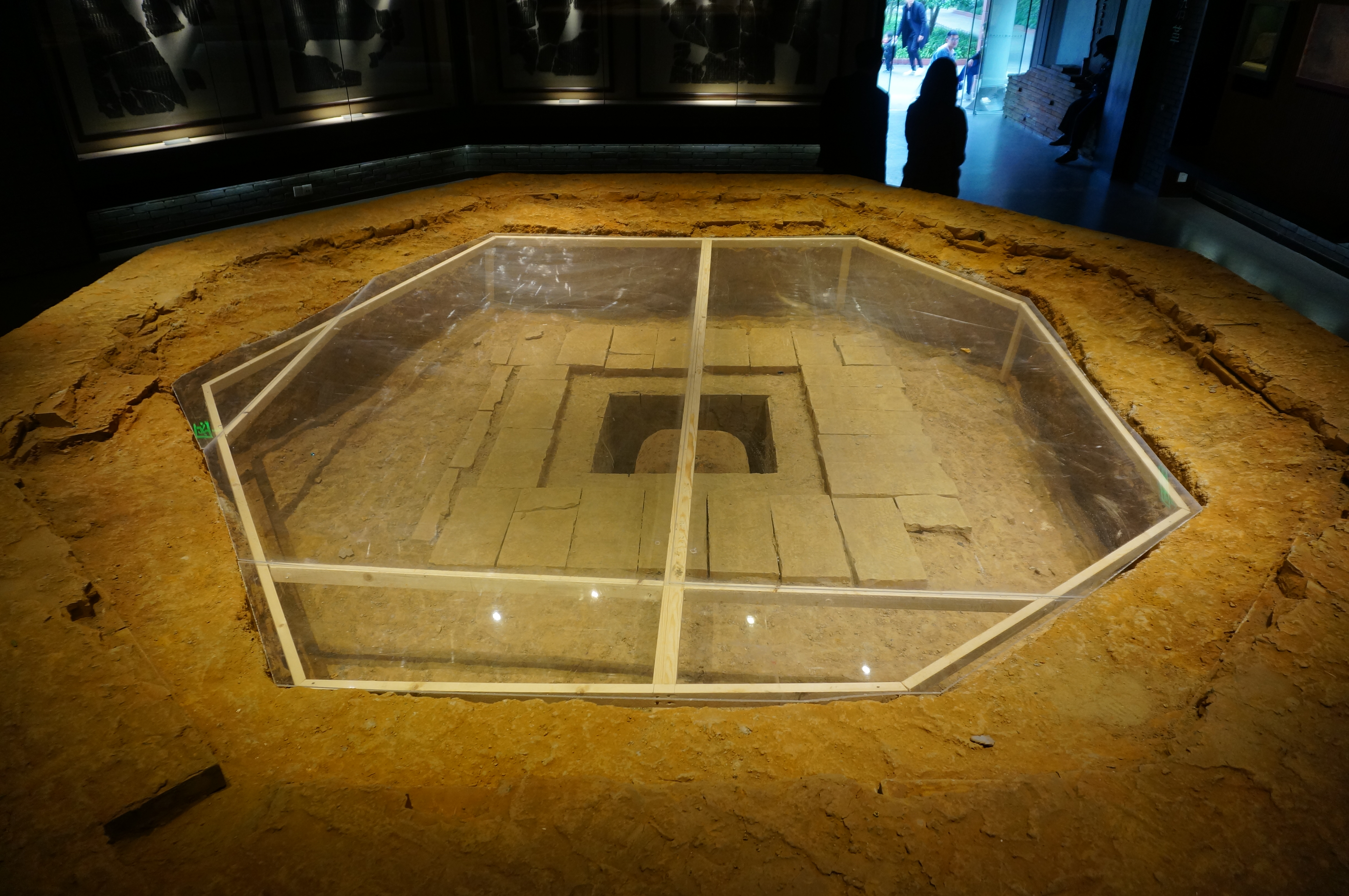
Model of the Underground Palace of Leifeng Pagoda

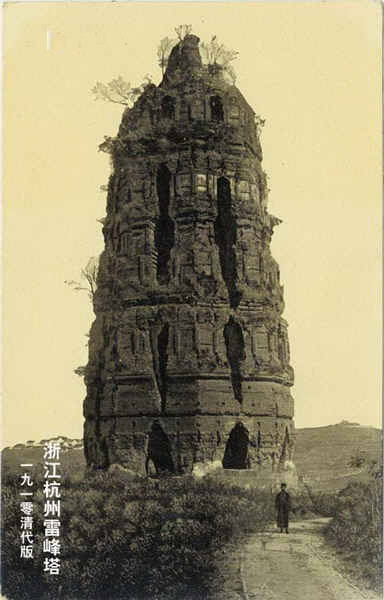
Original pagoda in 1910 before the collapse in 1924

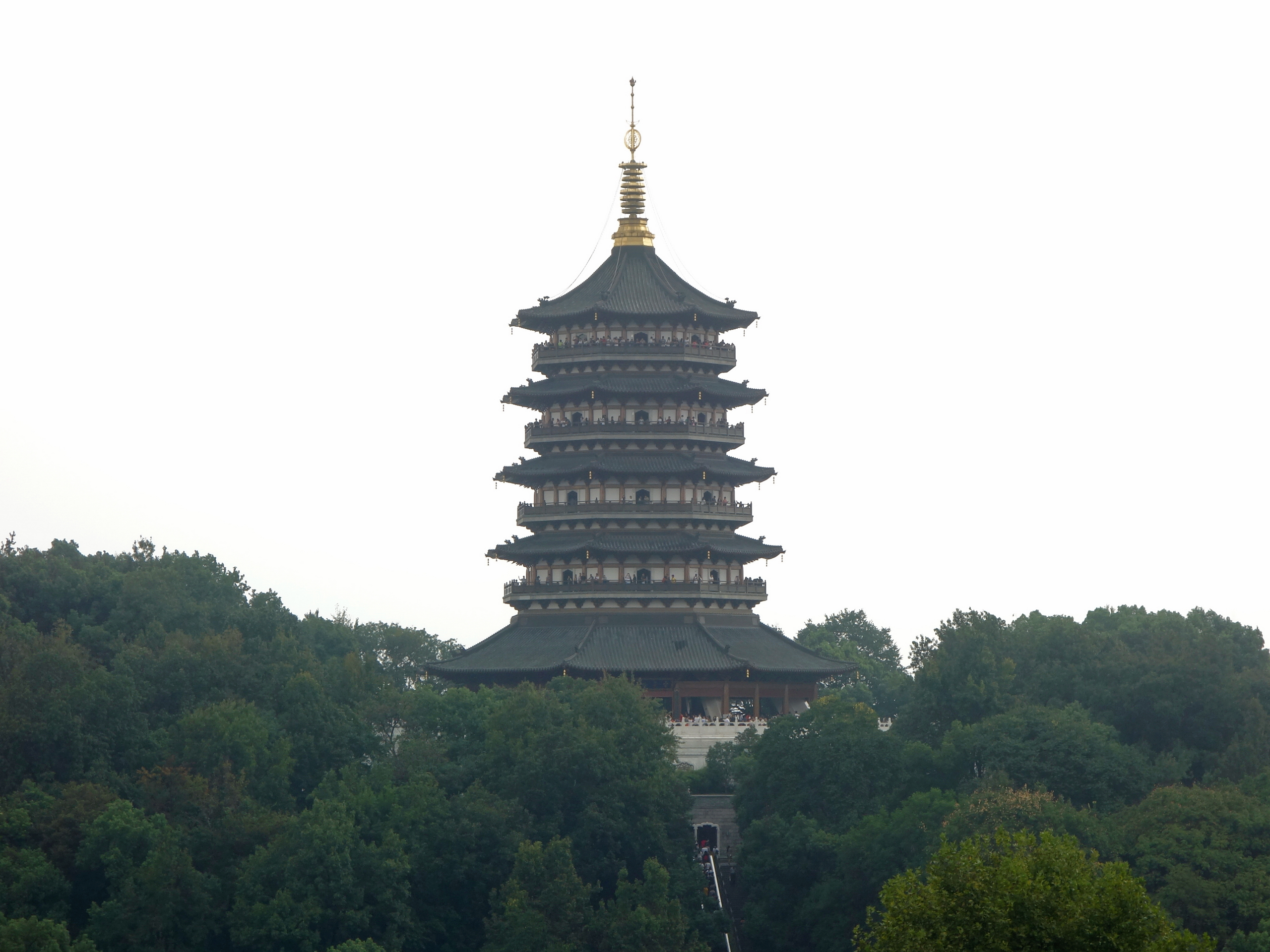
The New Leifeng Pagoda

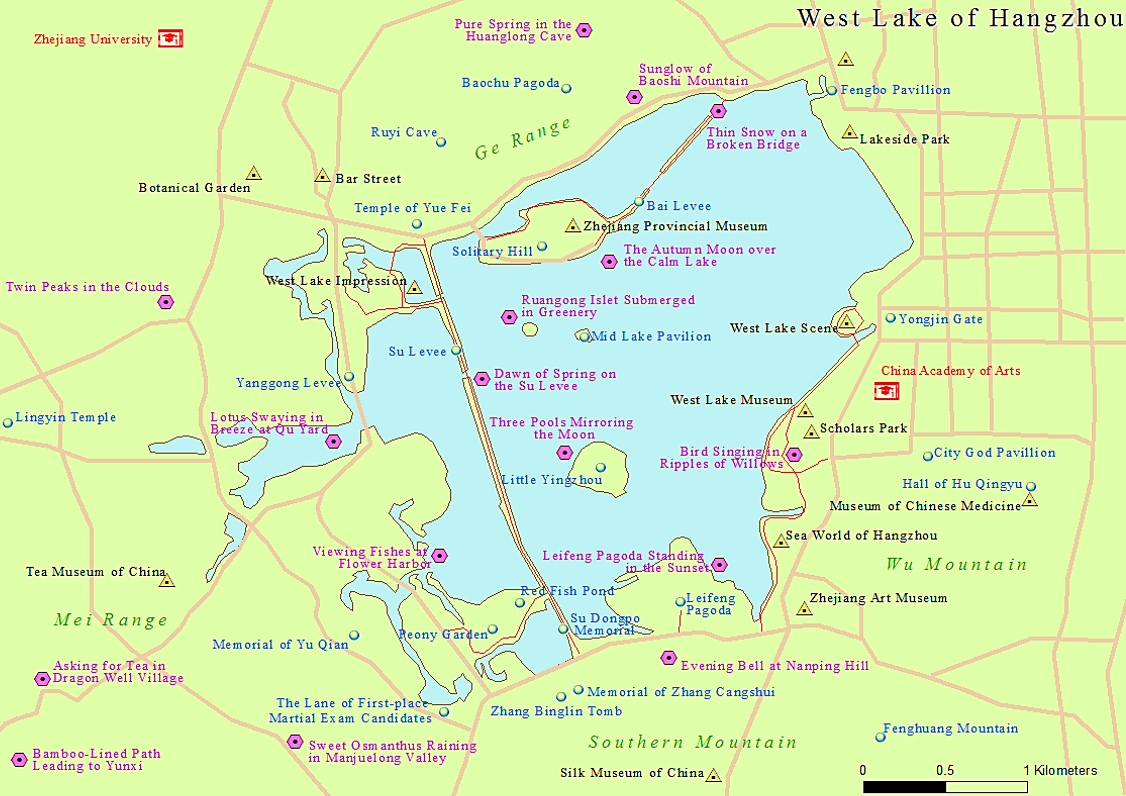
Map of the West Lake with the location of Leifeng Pagoda

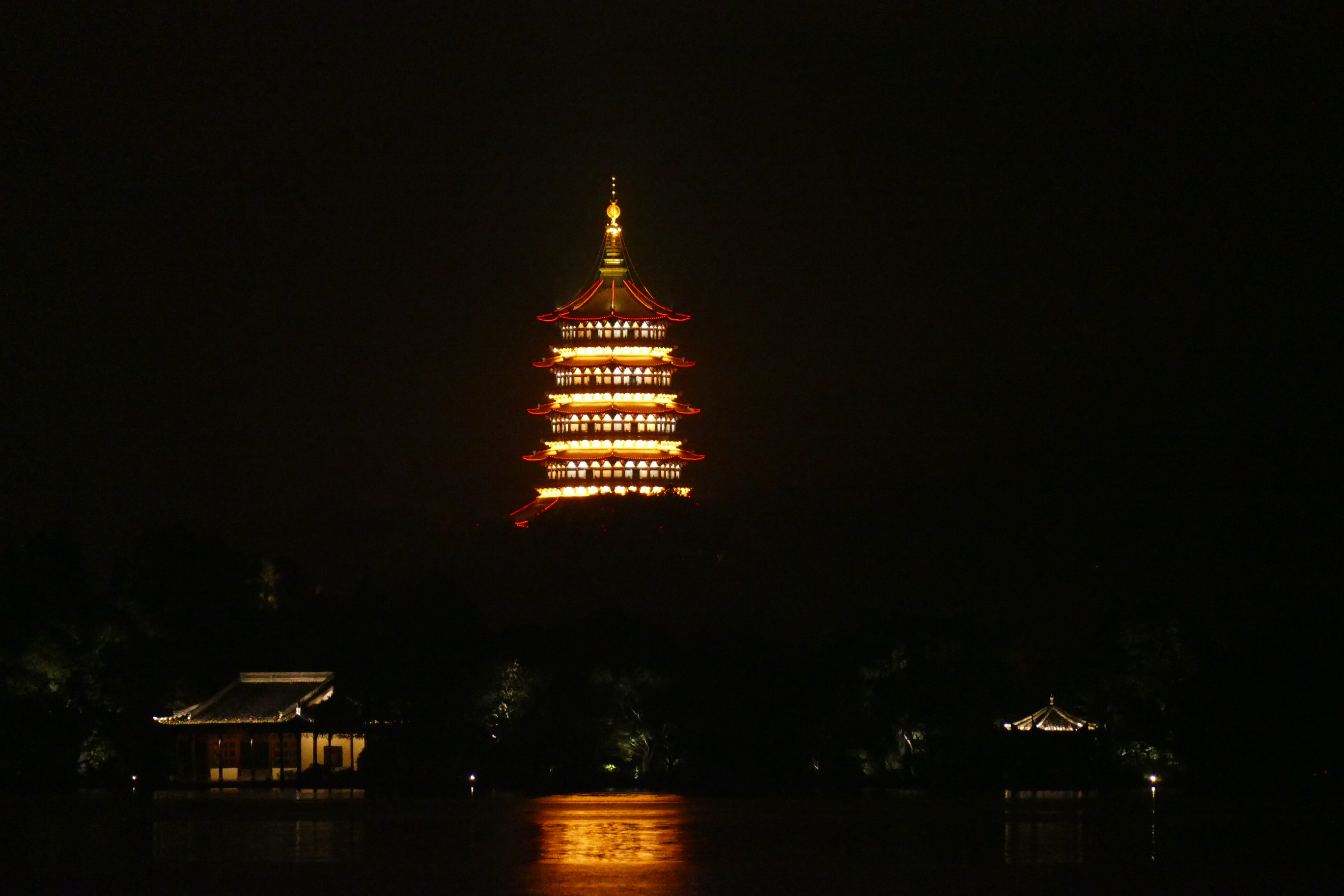
Leifeng Pagoda at night

The Leifeng Pagoda is a five-story, eight-sided tower located on Sunset Hill south of West Lake in Hangzhou, Zhejiang, China. Originally constructed in the year AD 975, it collapsed in 1924 but was rebuilt in 2002. Since then, it has become a popular tourist attraction. A view of the original pagoda at dusk was one of the famous Ten Scenes of West Lake and it was notable for featuring as a location in the Legend of the White Snake.

== History ==
=== Original ===
The original pagoda was built in 975 AD, during the Five Dynasties and Ten Kingdoms period, at the order of King Zhongyi (Qian Chu) of Wuyue for his favorite concubine, Consort Huang. The Leifeng Pagoda was an octagonal, five-story structure built of brick and wood with a base built of bricks.

During the Ming dynasty, Japanese pirates attacked Hangzhou. Suspecting the pagoda contained weapons, they burned its wooden elements, leaving only the brick skeleton, which can be seen from Ming paintings of the West Lake.

Leifeng Pagoda was one of the ten sights of the West Lake because of the Legend of the White Snake. In the Chinese folk story "The Legend of White Snake", the monk Fahai deceived Xu Xian to Jinshan Temple, and the White Lady ran into Jinshan to rescue Xu Xian, and was suppressed by Fahai under the Leifeng Pagoda.

Later, due to a superstition that the bricks from the tower could repel illness or prevent miscarriage, many people stole bricks from the tower to grind into powder. On the afternoon of September 25, 1924, the pagoda finally collapsed due to disrepair. At that time Lu Xun wrote two articles commenting on this event, using the pagoda to symbolize the collapse of pedantic traditional Chinese thoughts and expressing his hope for the future society. Xu Zhimo and Yu Pingbo also wrote poems and articles to commemorate the pagoda.

=== Reconstruction ===
In the 13th year of the Republic of China (1924), the brick tower of the Leifeng Pagoda fell into disrepair on 25 September and only the ruins remain.

In October 1999, the provincial and municipal governments decided to rebuild Leifeng Pagoda on top of the ruins of the old one. The new pagoda opened on 25 October 2002. It is composed of a 1400 tonne steel structure with 200 tonnes of copper parts. It contains four sightseeing elevators, and modern amenities such as air conditioning, television, and speakers. At the entrance of the pagoda, there are two autonomous escalators to carry visitors to the base of the pagoda.

The original base of the pagoda is kept in good condition, as well as the artifacts discovered in the underground chamber.

== Historical development ==
In the second year of Taiping Xingguo era of the Northern Song Dynasty (977 AD), the king of Wu Yue, Qian Chu, built a 7-storey tower named Huangfei Pagoda to offer Buddha's relics and pray for national peace and prosperity. Later, it was renamed as Leifeng Pagoda due to its location on Leifeng (Xizhao Mountain).

In the second year of Xuanhe in the Northern Song Dynasty (1120 AD), Leifeng Pagoda was destroyed by war and fire.

In the seventh year of the Qianlong era of the Southern Song Dynasty (1171), Master Zhiyou of Buddhism initiated the renovation of Leifeng Pagoda, only renovation to five floors.

During the Ming Jiajing period, the wooden eaves of the Leifeng Pagoda were destroyed by war, leaving only the reddish-brown brick tower core.

In the early Qing Dynasty, the Lei Feng Pagoda was still a reddish-brown brick tower. During his southern tour, Emperor Kangxi gave the name"Lei Feng Evening Glow" to it.

In the late Qing Dynasty, the Lei Feng Pagoda had fallen into disrepair due to its age, and the ignorant people had stolen bricks, weakening the foundation of the tower.

On September 25, 1924, in the thirteenth year of the Republic of China, the Lei Feng Pagoda collapsed due to excessive brick theft and excavation, as well as nearby construction work causing vibrations at the site.

In the year 1935, the Chinese architect Liang Sicheng put forward the idea of rebuilding the Leifeng Pagoda and suggested restoring it to its original state.

In May 1983, China's State Council approved the plan for the reconstruction of the Leifeng Pagoda project in the Hangzhou City Master Plan.

In 1988, Zhejiang Travel Future Research Association, Hangzhou Tourism Economics Association, Hangzhou Garden Society, Hangzhou Buddhist Association, Lingyin Temple, Zhejiang Overseas Chinese Association, Hangzhou Overseas Chinese Association, Overseas Chinese Hotel, Qianjiang Evening News, Jiangnan Travel Newspaper, etc. jointly initiated to organize the Leifeng Pagoda Reconstruction Promotion Association in the form of a civil organization and drafted the reconstruction of the origin, but due to many reasons still could not be put into practice.

In July 1999, the Zhejiang Provincial Government and Hangzhou Municipal Government approved the reconstruction of Leifeng Pagoda to be officially included in the agenda.

On December 16, 2000, the reconstruction project of Leifeng Pagoda was officially opened.

On October 25, 2002, the reconstruction of Leifeng Pagoda was completed and officially opened to the public.

== Architectural pattern ==
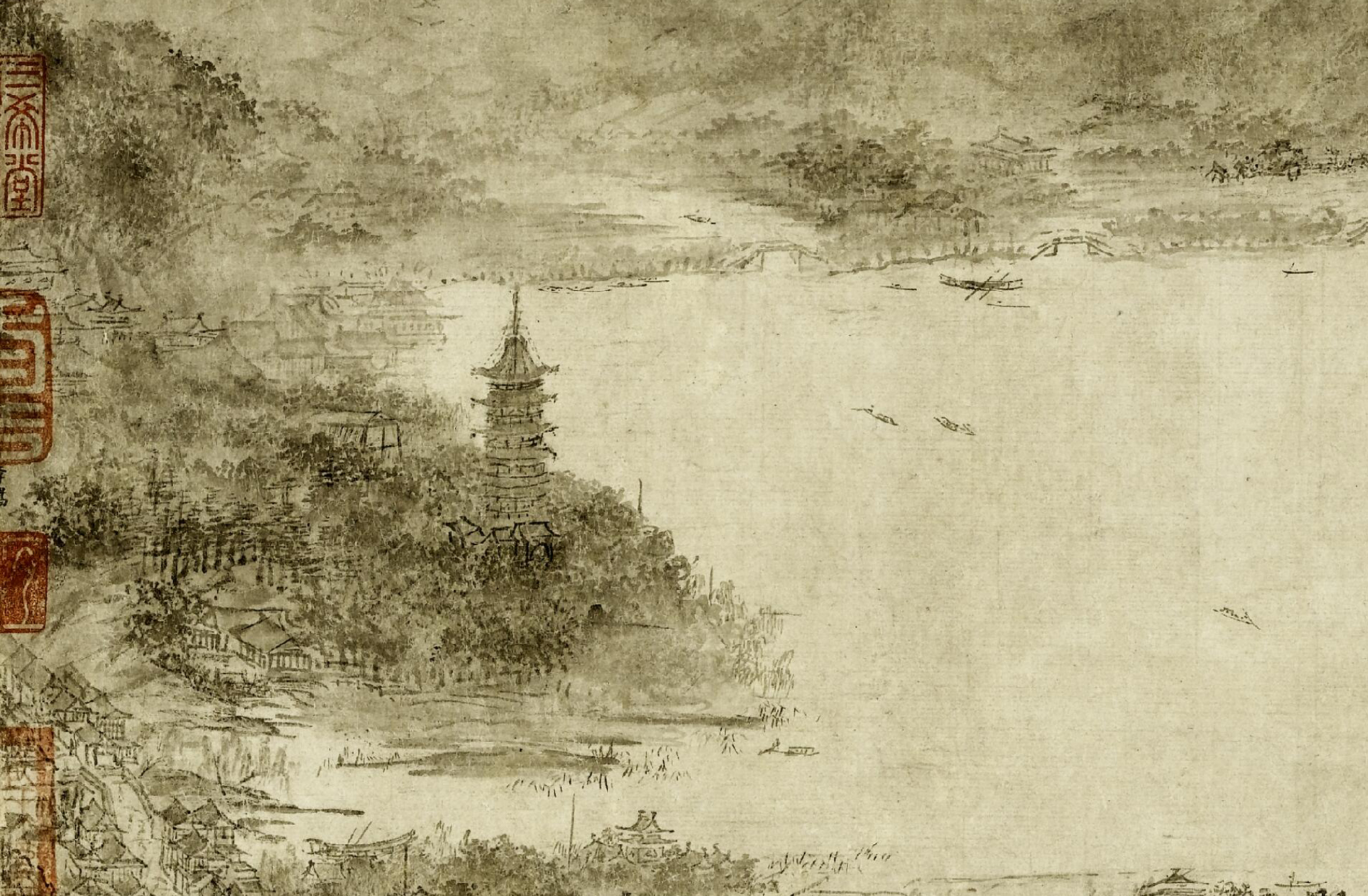
Leifeng Pagoda in the Southern Song Dynasty by Li Song

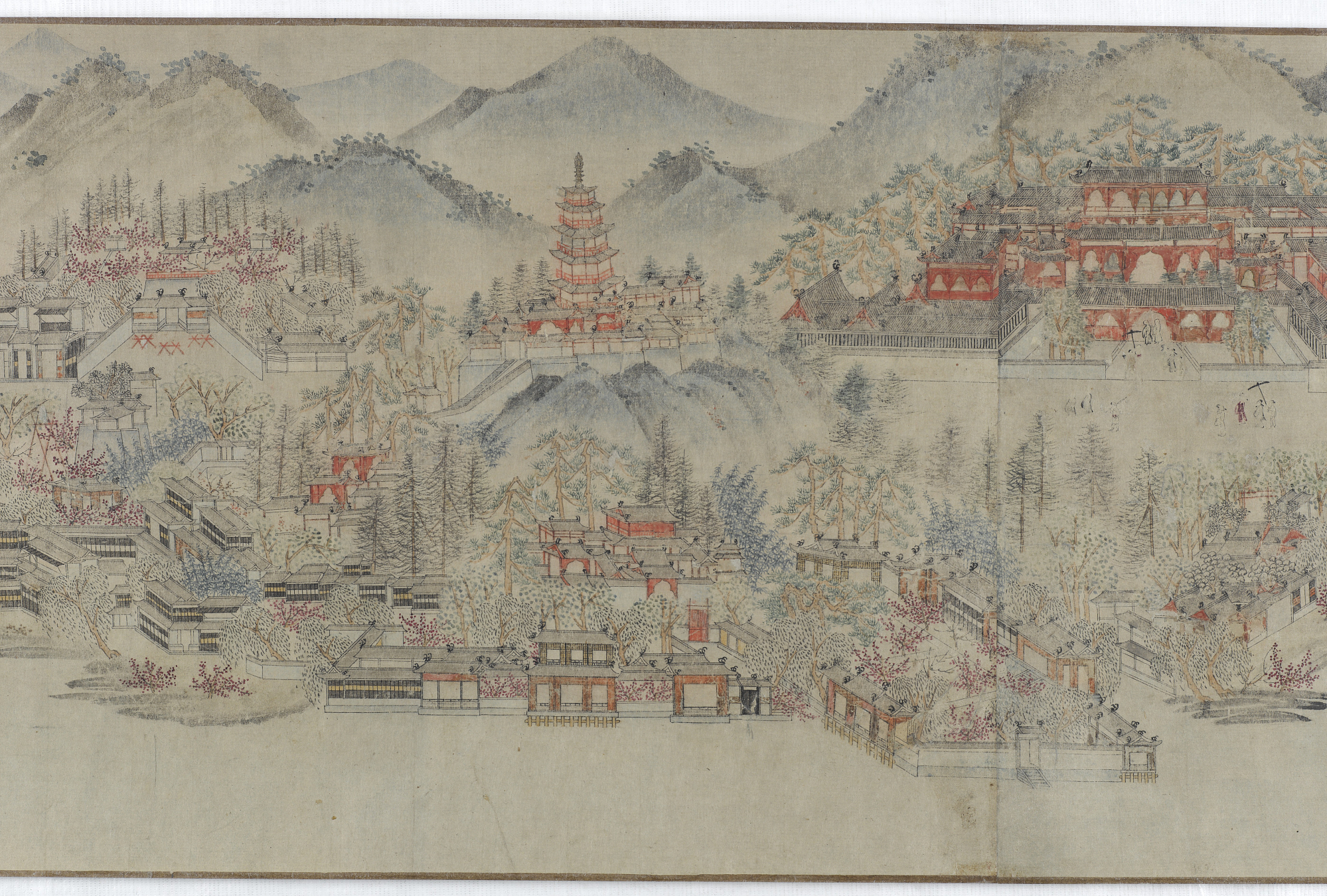
Scenic Attractions of West Lake 30

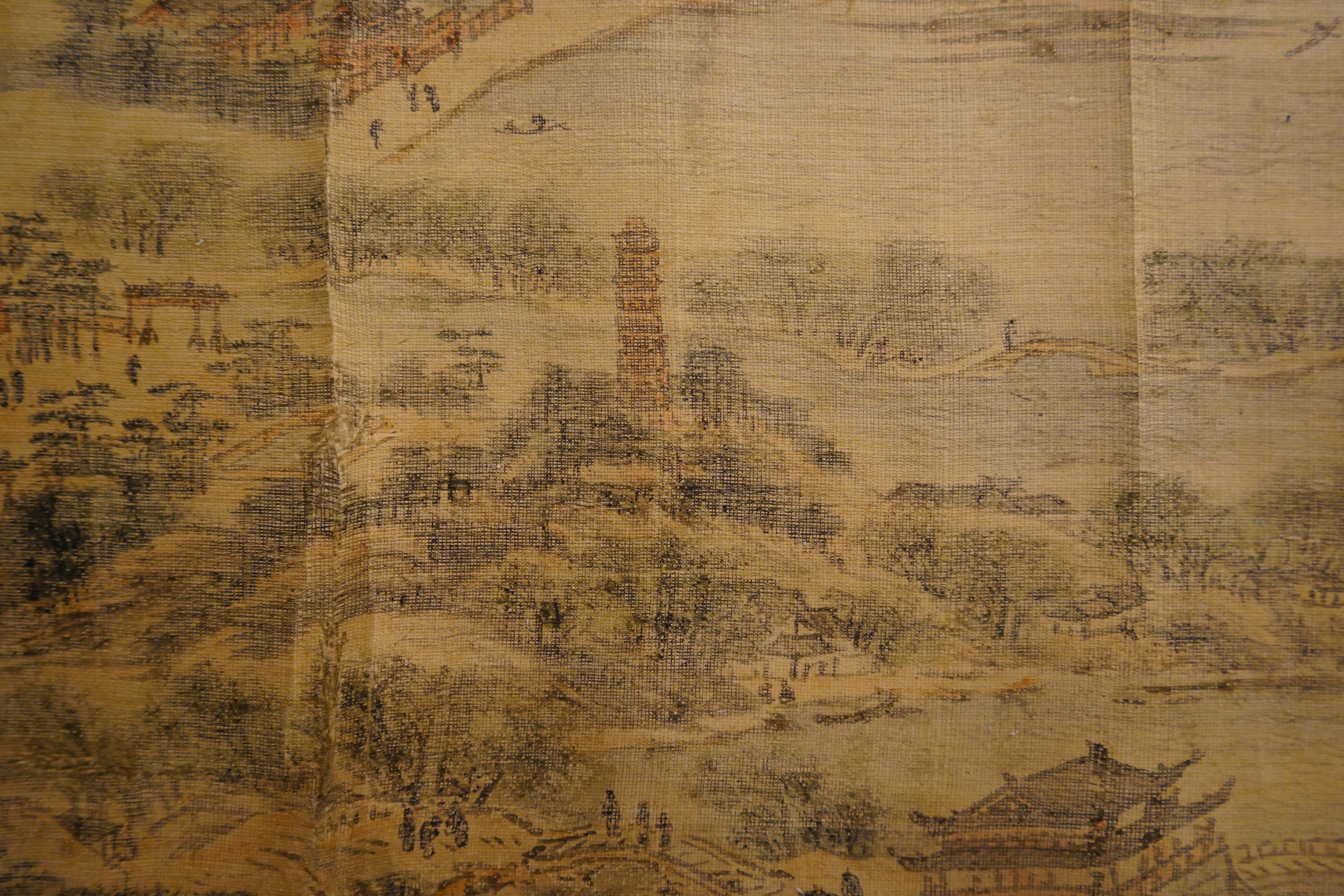
Leifeng Pagoda in the Ming Dynasty by Zhou Long

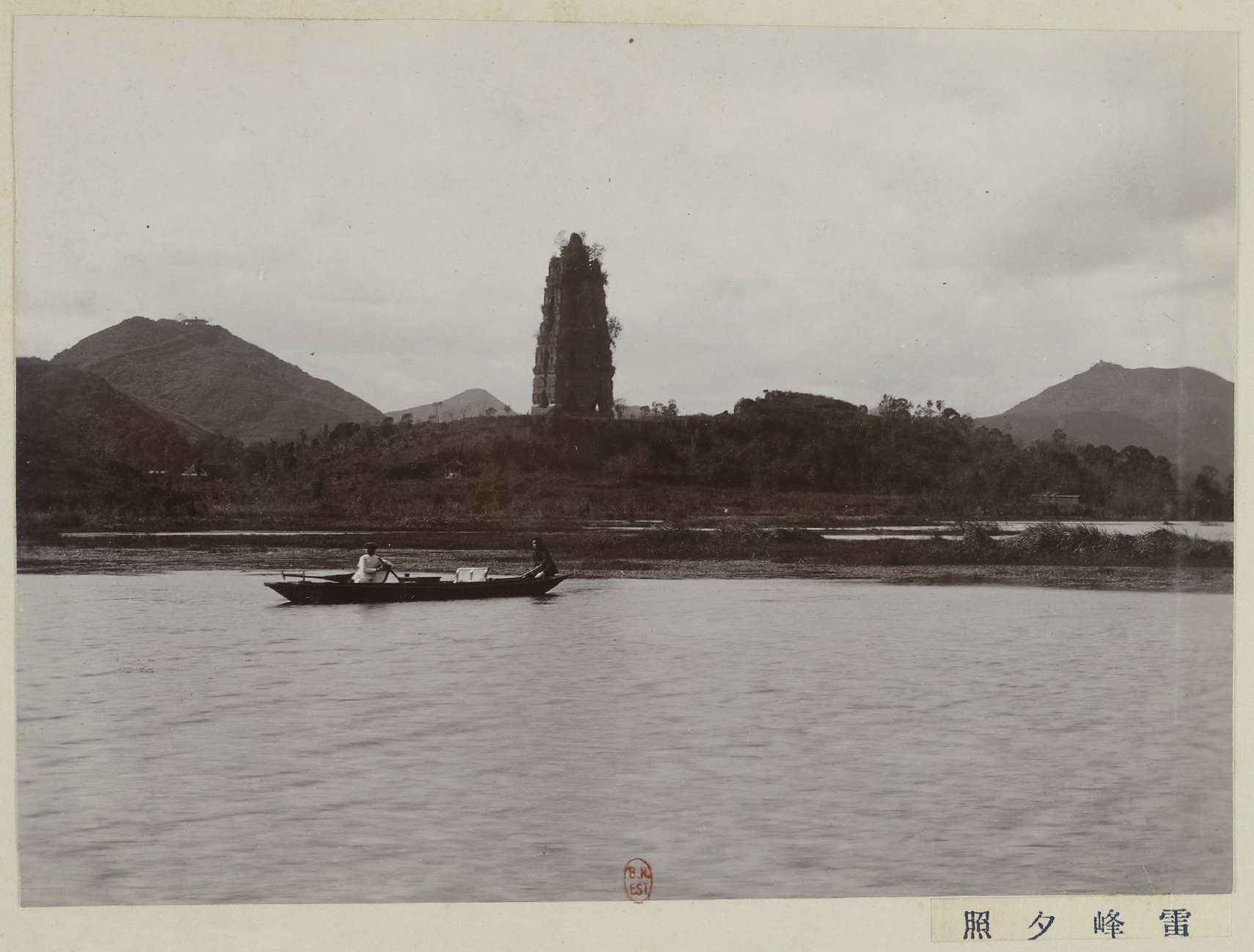
Leifeng Pagoda in the Sunset taken by Erwoxuan Photo Studio, 1911

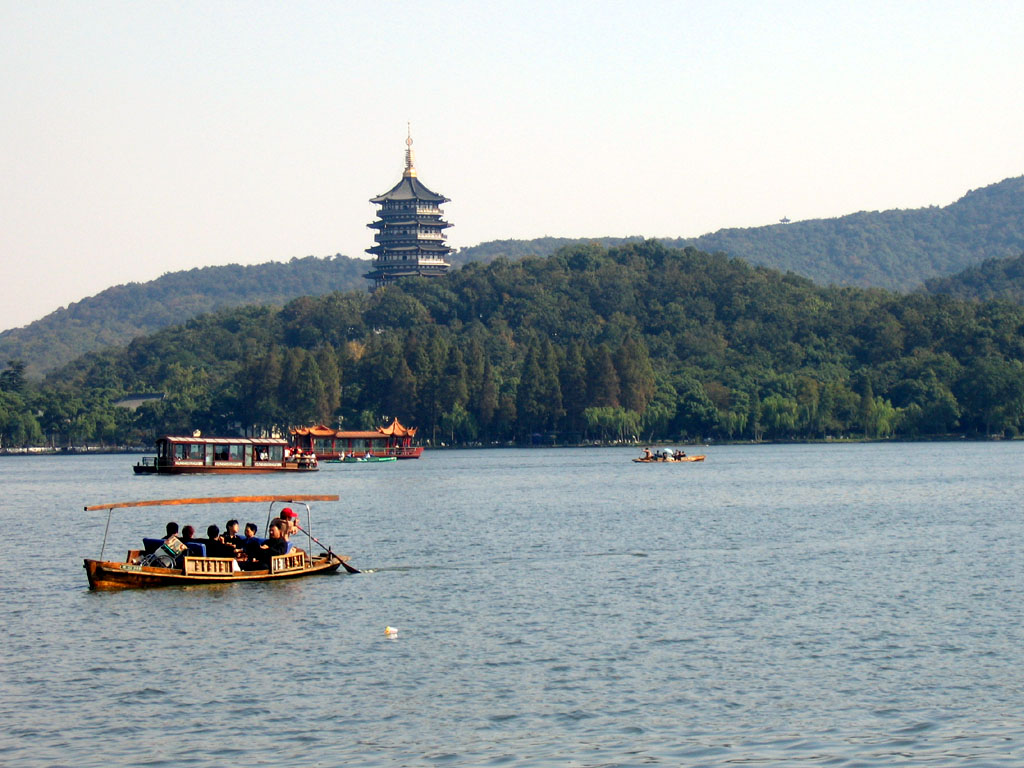
Rebuilt Leifeng Pagoda in the early 21st century

Overview

Leifeng Pagoda was originally a brick-wood structured tower in the style of a pavilion-like tower, with a wooden eave gallery (subsidiary steps, waist eave, flat seat, railing, etc.) outside and a brick tower body inside that can be climbed. There are stone carvings of the "Avatamsaka Sutra" on the tower wall. According to photos taken during the period of the Republic of China, the height of the original tower's bottom layer was about 12 meters, and the height of each of the other layers was about 8 meters, for a total height of about 50 meters. The pagoda top still has a cylindrical brick-paved stupa base.

Stylobate

From 2000 to 2001, the Zhejiang Provincial Institute of Cultural Relics and Archaeology conducted a clearance and excavation of the Leifeng Pagoda site. The identified remains of the site mainly include the tower foundation, underground palace, remaining tower body, and some peripheral buildings (such as monk rooms and roads). The tower foundation and tower body are both equilateral octagons. The tower foundation is a natural hill platform with brick and stone on the outer edge, which was flattened and modified. Each side is 17 meters long and the diagonal is 41 meters, with a height of 1.2-2.5 meters above the ground.

The base of the pagoda is built with stone-made Sumeru pedestal. As the terrain is higher in the west and lower in the east, a double-layered Sumeru pedestal is used on the eastern side, while a single-layered one is adopted on the western side. Carvings of Sumeru Mountain and the sea waves, symbolic of Buddhism's "Nine Mountains and Eight Seas," can be seen on the eastern pedestal, while an overturned lotus is carved on the western pedestal. A secondary platform runs between the outer edge of the pagoda base and the Sumeru pedestal. Judging from the 24 pieces of limestone square column tops excavated from the outer edge of the pagoda base, each face of the original secondary platform had four columns and three bays, with a width of about 5 meters for both the primary and secondary bays, and a depth of about 5.8 meters.

Only the lowest level of the tower remains, with an average height of 3–5 meters. It has a sleeve-corridor structure, with the outer sleeve, corridor, inner sleeve, and core chamber arranged from outer to inner, similar to the Tiger Hill Pagoda in Suzhou and the Liuhe Pagoda in Hangzhou. This is a typical Buddhist tower style from the late Wu and Yue dynasties. The outer sleeve has a length of 10 meters and a diameter of 25 meters, making it the largest existing tower among the Five Dynasties. It is 4.2 meters deep and has a door on each side. The staircase to climb the tower is located inside the southern gate. The corridor is 1.8-2.3 meters wide, and the inner sleeve is 3.7 meters deep with doors at intervals, leading to the core chamber. The tower is entirely made of bricks with yellow mud used to join them. The bricks are rectangular, usually 37 cm long, 18 cm wide, and 6 cm thick, with inscriptions related to their origin and age on one side. Some bricks are scripture bricks, with a circular hole 2.5 cm in diameter and 10 cm deep used for storing scripture scrolls on one end.

The newly reconstructed Lei Feng Pagoda is located on the original site, and was designed by Guo Daiheng and Lv Zhou of the School of Architecture at Tsinghua University. The pagoda is built in the style and scale of the Southern Song Dynasty, and remains a five-story octagonal tower. However, it features a steel frame structure, with the main structural components such as pillars, brackets, and tiles made of copper. The new pagoda consists of three parts: a protective cover, the pagoda body, and the spire. It stands at a height of 71.679 meters, with the protective cover standing 9.7 meters high and consisting of two layers of inclined steel pillars and horizontal steel beams, forming a column-free space with a span of 48 meters that covers the original site and supports the upper pagoda body. The pagoda body is approximately 45 meters high and consists of five stories, with two hydraulic elevators and steel stairs inside. The spire is 16.1 meters high. The newly Leifeng Pagoda has become the highest point of the south line of West Lake and offers a panoramic view of the lake from its top.

== Pagoda body ==
First Floor

The main entrance of Leifeng Pagoda features a golden plaque inscribed with the character "Leifeng Pagoda" by the calligrapher Qigong. The ground is paved with glass and beneath it lies the protective layer of the Leifeng Pagoda site (i.e. the foundation).

Hidden Floor

The hidden floor of Leifeng Pagoda is decorated with intricate carvings in the form of Dongyang woodcarvings depicting the love story of Bai Niangzi and Xu Xian in the legend of "The Legend of the White Snake". The carvings utilize five different techniques, including round carving, semi-round carving, high relief, deep relief, and shallow relief, which are combined in a form called "overlay carving" to enhance the storytelling and character portrayal of the legend.

Second Floor

The cultural display on the second floor of Leifeng Pagoda mainly has the "Wuyue Building Tower Picture".

Third Floor

The third floor of Leifeng Pagoda features four pieces of inscribed poetry, each with three poems, for a total of 12 selected from excellent poetic works describing Leifeng Pagoda and the "Leifeng Sunset" from different eras. They are accompanied by illustrations of scenery and characters.

Fourth Floor

The interior of the fourth floor of Leifeng Pagoda features a display of Oushe sculptures depicting the specific locations of the ten scenic spots of West Lake, collectively known as the "New Face of West Lake".

Fifth Floor

The fifth floor of Leifeng Pagoda boasts a golden dome made of exquisite gold-plating art, featuring a large lotus flower in the center as a symbol of purity and a wish for world peace. Above the dome is a secret chamber that houses a replica of the Heavenly Palace, along with items and inscriptions passed down to future generations, such as the reconstruction of the Leifeng Sunset and a model of the new Leifeng Pagoda. The walls are filled with small Buddha niches, each containing a mini golden leifeng pagoda, totaling 2002, representing and commemorating the reconstruction of Leifeng Pagoda in 2002 A.D.

== Culture ==
The collapse of the Leifeng Pagoda coincided with China's new cultural movement, and Lu Xun published On the Fall of the Leifeng Pagoda and On the Fall of the Leifeng Pagoda Again, arguing that it represented the old feudal system and feudal morality and that its collapse was a historical necessity, and expressing his desire for a new social construction and renewal in the future. Xu Zhimo and Yu Pingbo, on the other hand, composed poems and essays expressing their regret from a historical and cultural perspective respectively. Eileen Chang's 1963 autobiographical novel in English, The Fall of the Pagoda (also translated as Leifeng Pagoda), is similar to Lu Xun in that it also represents the fall of Leifeng Pagoda as the collapse of the traditional Chinese society's way of life and old values.

== Excavated objects ==
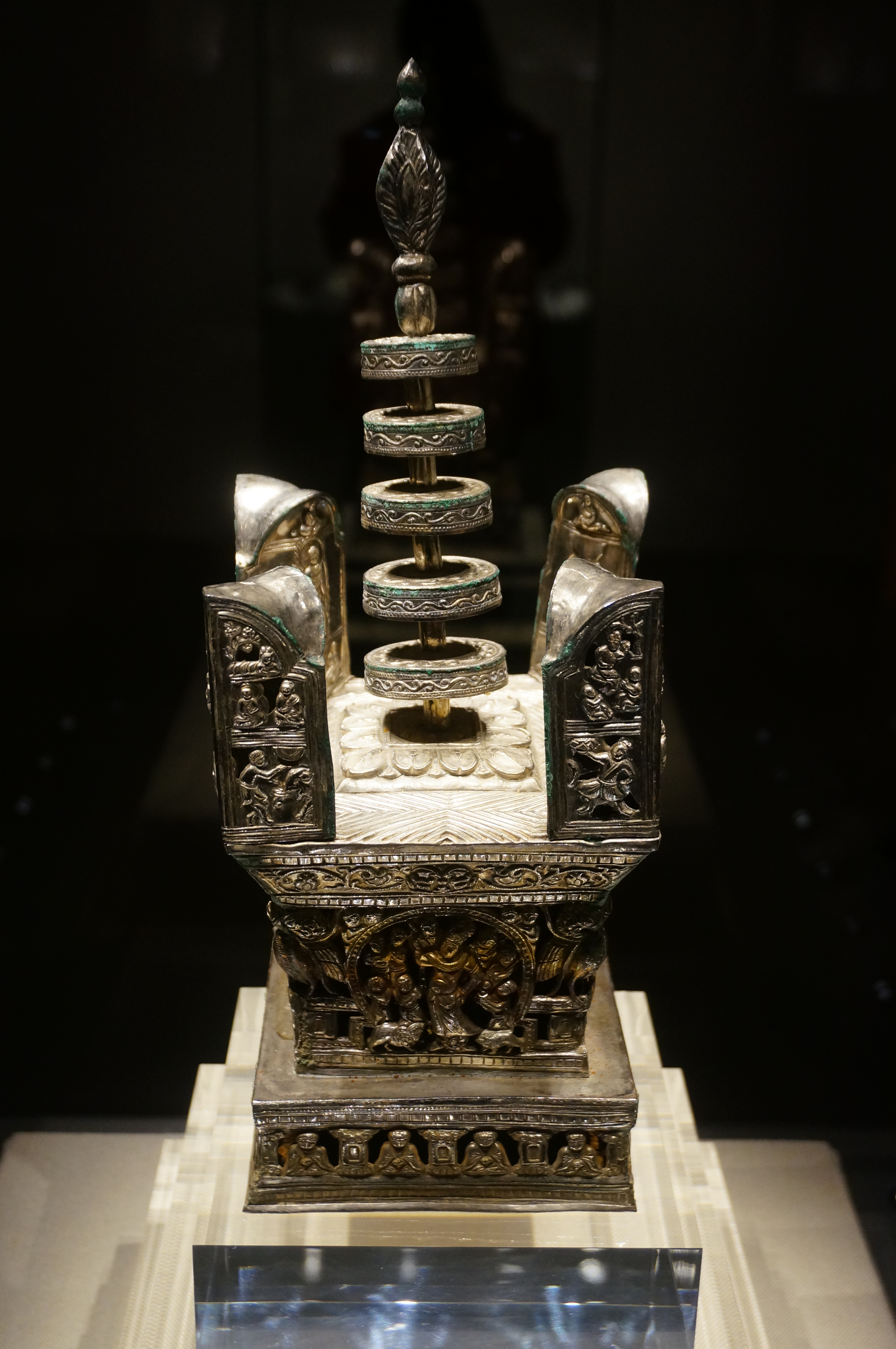
The Ashoka Pagoda in gilt and sterling silver, a national relic

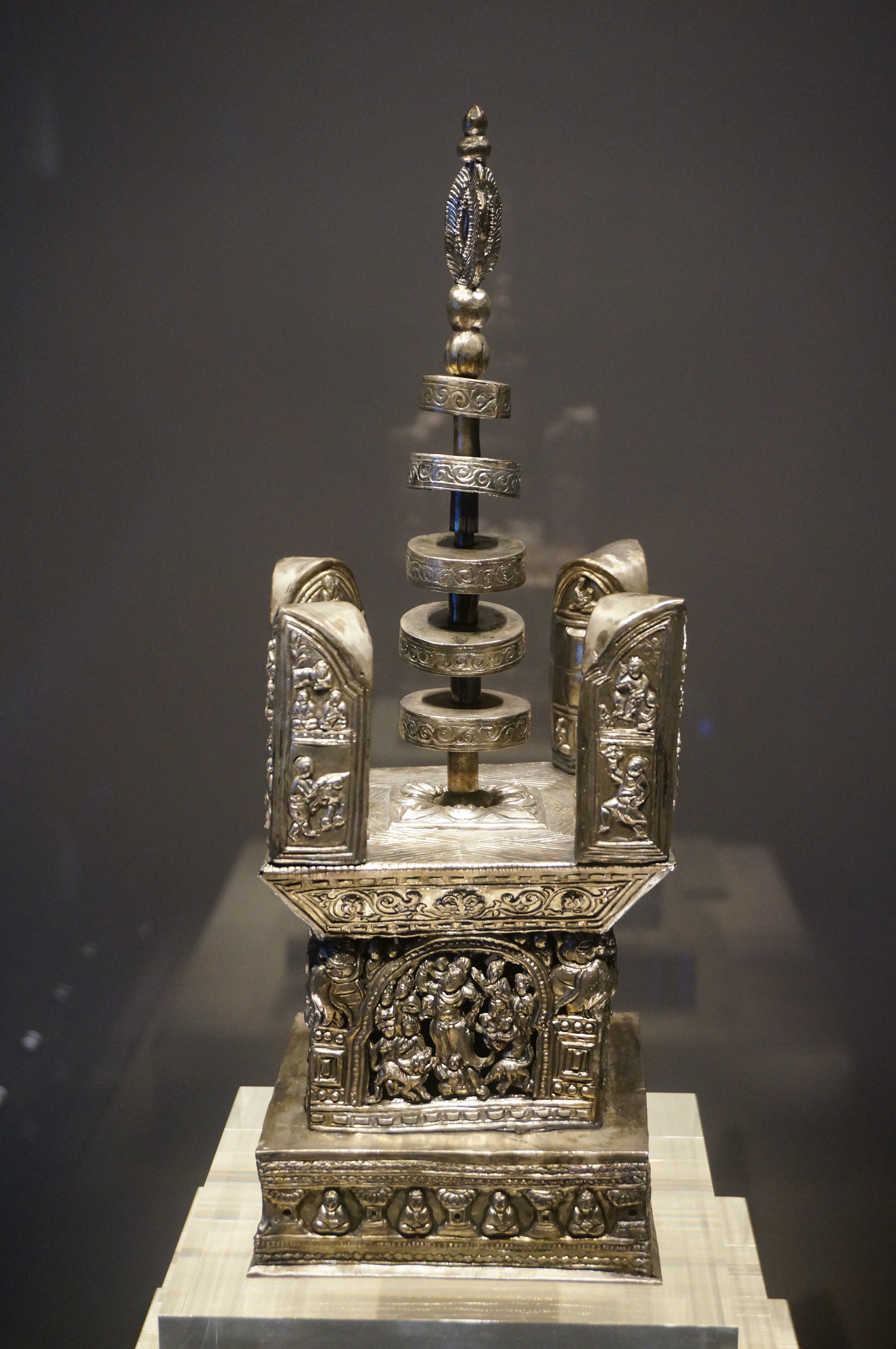
Silver Ashoka Pagoda

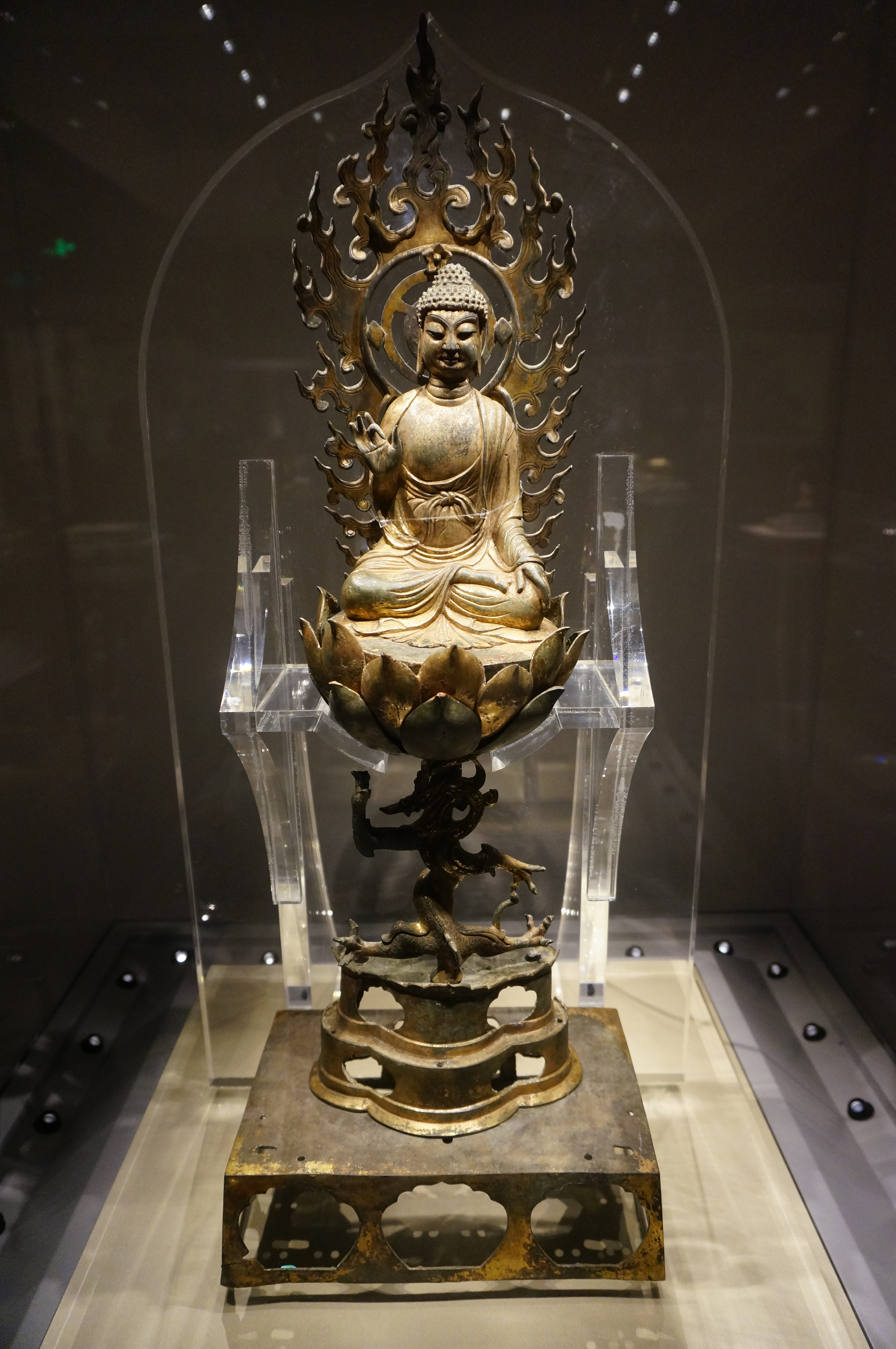
Gilt-bronze statue of Shakyamuni Buddha speaking, a national relic

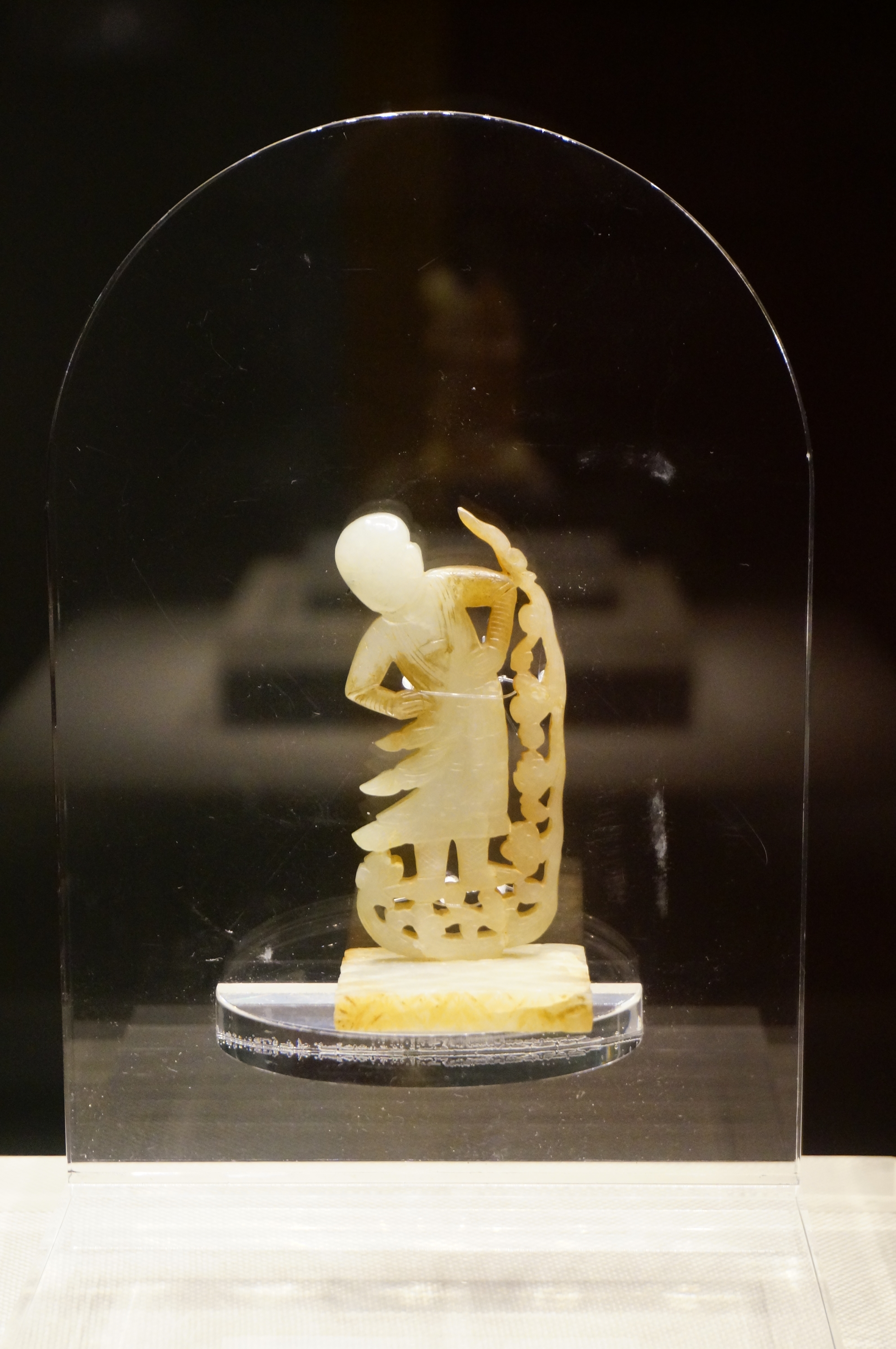
Jade standing statue of the Boy of Good Fortune, a national relic

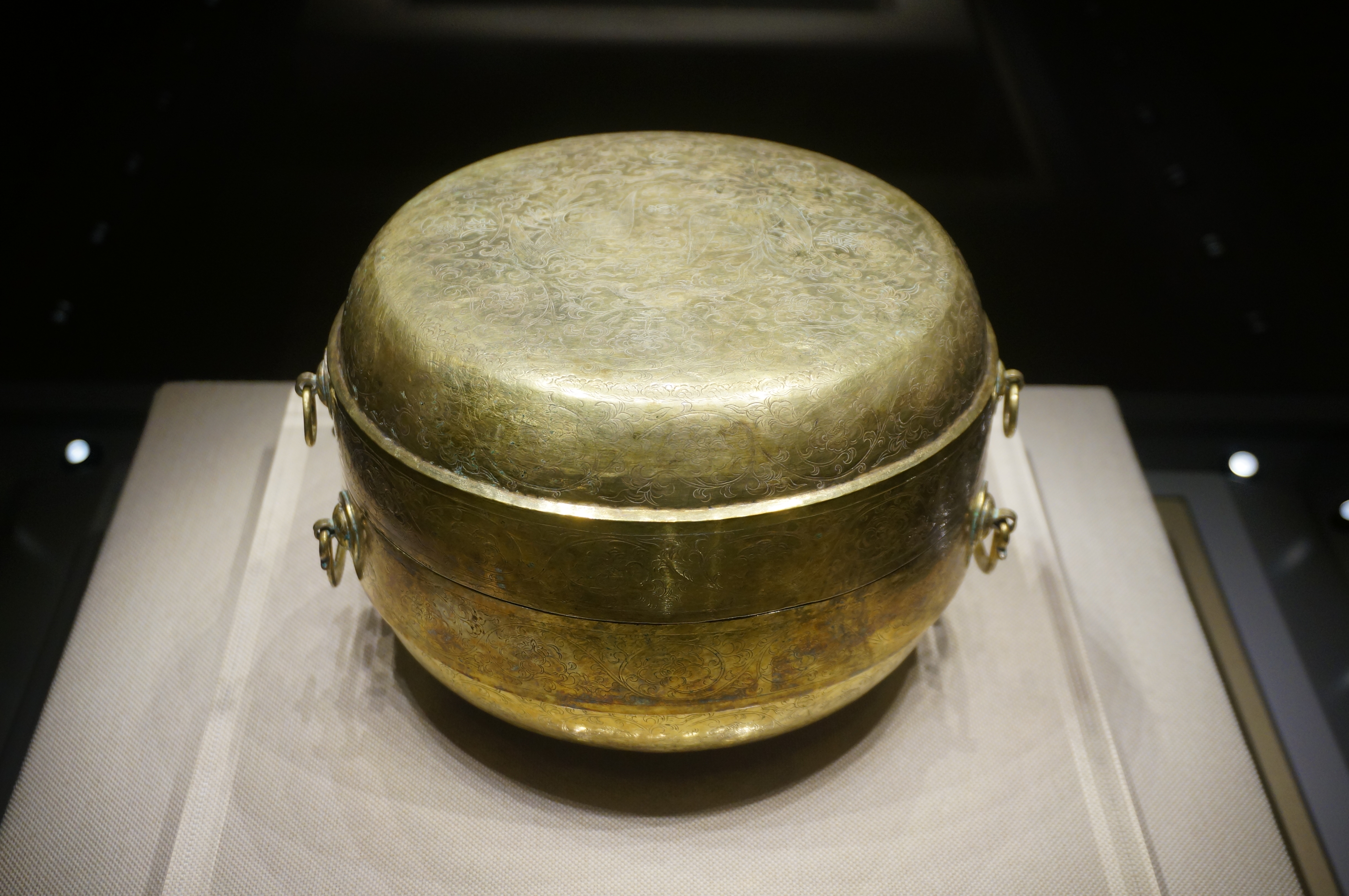
A gilt silver box inscribed "Long Live the Thousand Years", a national relic

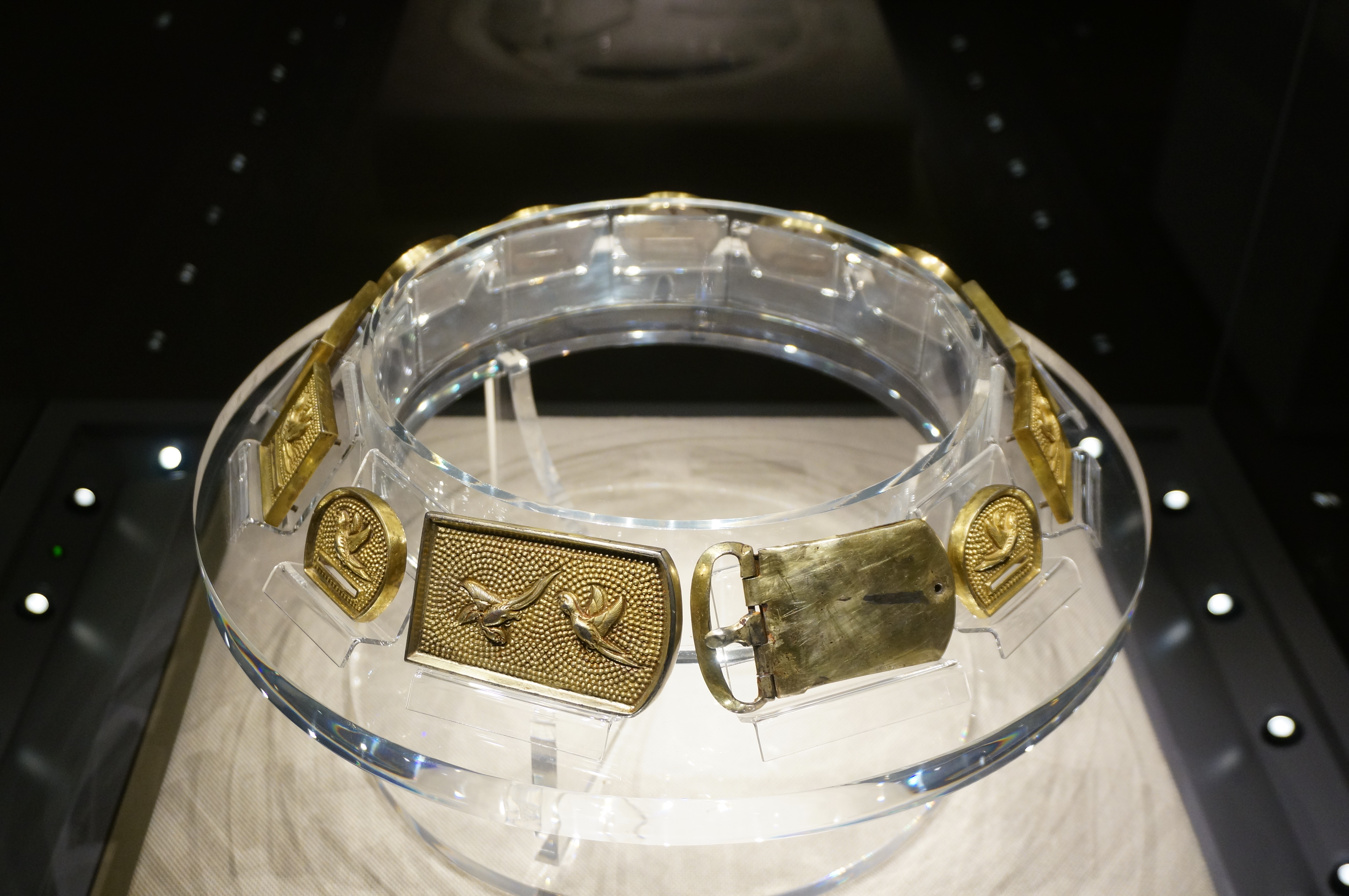
A gilt-silver girdle with parrot motif, a national relic

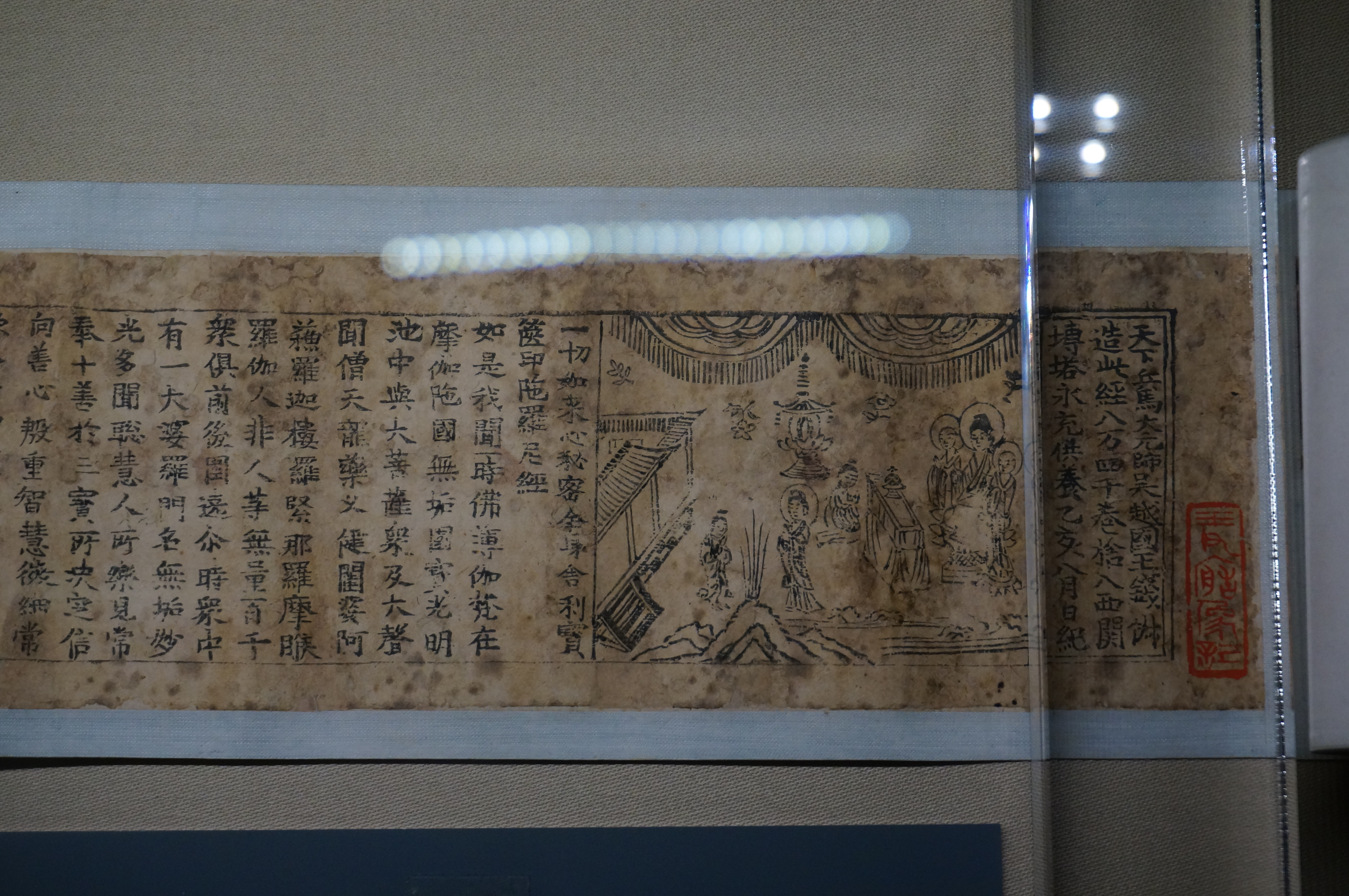
Engraved Sutra Scroll of the Secret Body Sutra of the Heart of the Buddha, National Heritage

During excavations between 2000 and 2001, archaeologists unearthed a large number of artifacts from the tower site and the underground palace respectively, most of which are now collected and exhibited in the Zhejiang Provincial Museum.

A total of 1104 stone carvings were unearthed from other parts of the site besides the underground palace, all of them fragments, most of them on the ground floor corridor and in the doorways, mainly the Sutra of the Buddhāvataṃsaka Sūtra (nearly 1000 pieces) and the Diamond Sutra (nearly 100 pieces), which were originally placed on the outer wall of the outer sleeve, as well as the Sutra of the Huayan Sutra by Qian Biao and the Sutra of the Southern Song Dynasty (1199) in the fifth year of the Qing Yuan period. The two fragmentary stelae, the "Record of the Creation of the Qing Yuan Repair", are of great value in interpreting the life of the Leifeng Pagoda. In addition, there is one pure silver Ashoka pagoda (fragmentary when excavated, later restored from a gilt pure silver Ashoka pagoda excavated from the underground palace) and one bronze Ashoka pagoda (fragmentary), one small stone pagoda, seven gilt bronze statues, one iron statue, ten stone statues (fragmentary), a large number of pagoda bricks and decorative elements, one plain bronze mirror, one iron mirror, two bronze cymbals, one bronze lantern, two silver ornaments, and 100 The Kaiyuan Tongbao and 10 Qianyuan Chongbao.

Fifty-one groups of artefacts were excavated from the underground palace in the pagoda. These include one iron relic letter, one gilt sterling silver ayurveda, one gilt silver box, one pair of mandarin duck and lotus leaf motif openwork silver ornaments, one round openwork silver ornament, three silver armlets, one silver flower hairpin, one pair of small silver ornaments, five gilt bronze Buddha statues, one jade boy, one jade guanyin, one jade coin, one jade tortoise, one onyx pendant, one onyx round bead, one gilt wood stand, one lacquer bracelet, ten bronze mirror, 1 glass vase, 1 beaded necklace and 3 sutra scrolls (mutilated). In addition to these, 3428 coins were found in the palace, dating from the fifth year of Emperor Wen of the Western Han Dynasty (175 BC) to the first year of the Song Emperor Jianlong (960).

The former was placed in the earthly palace and contained a gold vessel wrapped in a thin gold sheet in the form of a coffin, the details of which are unknown as it was not opened, and was believed to contain the relics of the Buddha's bun hair; the latter is thought to have been placed in the heavenly palace and a gourd-shaped gold vase, which also contained the relics, was suspended inside the tower.

== Visit information ==
Location

Leifeng Pagoda is located at No. 15 Nanshan Road, Xihu District, Hangzhou City, Zhejiang Province, China

Ticket price

40 yuan/person

Transportation

Subway

Take the Hangzhou subway line 7 to Wushan Square Station, and then walk to the destination.
