= Lü Wencheng =

- Born: March 12, 1898; Zhongshan, Guangdong Province, China
- Died: 1981 (aged 82–83); British Hong Kong

Lü Wencheng (吕文成, pinyin: Lǚ Wénchéng, or Lui Man Sing in Cantonese, jyutping: Leoi5 Man4 Sing4) (1898 in Zhongshan - 1981 in Hong Kong) was a Chinese composer and musician. He composed Autumn Moon Over The Calm Lake (平湖秋月) in the 1930s, one of the best known works of Cantonese music.

He also played the yangqin and was a Cantonese opera singer. His music shows a strong influence of the traditional music of the Shanghai area as a result of living almost thirty years there.

== Life ==
Lü was born in 1898 in Zhongshan, Guangdong Province, but grew up in Shanghai when at the age of three he and his parents moved to Shanghai. There he developed the gaohu, composed and performed Guangdong yinyue, and made recordings. In 1932, he moved to Hong Kong, where he lived until his death in 1981. His daughter, Lü Hong (吕红), is a professional singer, and the wife of Chinese musician Lui Tsun-Yuen.

== Works ==
Lü is considered to have been a master of Cantonese music (Guangdong yinyue) and Guangdong folk music.

He developed, or co-developed, the gaohu in the 1920s from the erhu by raising its pitch and using steel strings instead of silk, and changing its playing position from on the thigh to between the knees.

He composed Autumn Moon Over the Calm Lake (平湖秋月; pinyin: Píng Hú Qiū Yuè) in the 1930s, and this piece remains to this day one of the best known works of Cantonese music.

His piece "Tiger down the Mountain" (下山虎; pinyin: Xià Shān Hǔ) is quoted in the Chinese Rhapsody by Xian Xinghai.

== Compositions ==
Lü composed over 100 pieces, including:

- bù bù gāo (步步高) Higher step by step
- chén zuì dōng fēng 沉醉东风 Intoxicated by the easterly wind
- jiāo shí míng qín 蕉石鸣琴
- luò huā tiān 落花天 Flowers falling from sky
- píng hú qiū yuè (平湖秋月) Autumn Moon Over Calm Lake
- qīng méi zhú mǎ 青梅竹马 Happy childhood
- qí shān fèng 岐山凤 Phoenix of Mount Qishan
- xǐng shī 醒狮 Awakening lion
- yín hé huì 银河会 Meeting in the Milky Way
- yú gē wǎn chàng 渔歌晚唱 Fisherman's song at dusk
- xià shān hǔ 下山虎 Tiger down the Mountain

== Audio sample ==
- Performance of Lü Wencheng's Autumn Moon Over Calm Lake (平湖秋月) by Jiyang Chen
- 78 RPM recording of Lü Wencheng's Tiger down the Mountain (下山虎) performed by Lü Wencheng
