= Autumn Moon Over the Calm Lake =

Chinese folk song

Autumn Moon Over the Calm Lake (平湖秋月; pinyin: Píng Hú Qiū Yuè; Jyutping: ping4 wu4 cau1 jyut6), also known as Autumn Moon over a Placid Lake or Inebriated Peace (醉太平), is an early 20th century Cantonese music piece that was written by Lü Wencheng in the 1930s and is considered his most representative piece. He composed the music on a visit to the famous West Lake in Hangzhou, and is a sublime expression of his veneration for the beauty and grace of the scenery. The West Lake has been considered since the ancient times as a gorgeous place of tranquility, and the music illustrates the atmosphere and feel of the place with placid suppleness. In this piece, which is one of his most famous, Lü combined elements of Zhejiang silk-and-bamboo music with Cantonese music. A piano transcription by Chen Peixun is a part of the repertoire of many Chinese pianists.

== Inspiration ==
Lü Wencheng composed this piece after visiting West Lake in Hangzhou during the Mid-Autumn Festival; he was deeply moved by the scenery of Pinghu Qiuyue (Autumn Moon over the Calm Lake) — one of the Ten Scenes of West Lake — and the composition was born of this emotional response to the landscape.

== Origins ==
Its melody derives from the Northern folk tune Gui Wu (閨舞, lit. Boudoir Dance or Maiden's Dance); it circulated widely as a piece of Cantonese operatic music before being adapted by Lü Wencheng into an instrumental solo, typically featuring the gaohu (高胡) as the lead instrument. The artistic character of Autumn Moon over the Calm Lake lies in its beautiful, lyrical melody—which bears traces of Northern musical styles—and its fluid, lively rhythm; together, they evoke a serene and poetic atmosphere reminiscent of moonlight spilling onto a flowing river or the shimmering ripples of a lake.

== Legacy and Adaptations ==
Due to its classic melody, the piece has inspired numerous adaptations. Notably, pianist Chen Peixun (陳培勳) arranged it as a piano solo — also titled Autumn Moon over the Calm Lake — which preserves the charm of traditional Chinese Jiangnan sizhu (江南絲竹, lit. Silk and Bamboo of Southern Yangtze River) music while incorporating the piano's rich expressive capabilities; it has since become a classic Chinese repertoire staple frequently performed by pianists worldwide, including Lang Lang.
