= Cantonese music =

Cantonese music may refer to:

- The music of Cantonese-speaking peoples, especially:
  - Music of Guangdong
  - Music of Hong Kong
  - Music of Macau
- Cantonese language music, especially Cantopop
- A style of traditional instrumental music known as Guangdong music
