= Yangqin =

Chinese percussion stringed instrument

- A yangqin at the Musical Instrument Museum , Phoenix, Arizona

String instrument
- Classification: Percussion instrument (chordophone), string instrument
- Hornbostel–Sachs classification: 314.122-4 (Simple chordophone sounded by hammers)
- Developed: Antiquity

Related instruments
- Hammered dulcimer; Appalachian dulcimer; Autoharp; Cimbalom; Psaltery; Tambourine de Bearn; Zither

The yangqin (simplified Chinese: 扬琴; traditional Chinese: 揚琴; pinyin: yángqín; Jyutping: joeng4 kam4) is a trapezoidal Chinese hammered dulcimer, likely derived from the Iranian santur or the European dulcimer. It used to be written with the characters 洋琴 (lit. 'foreign zither'), but the first character was changed in the early 20th century to 揚 (also pronounced yáng), meaning "acclaimed". It is also spelled yang ch'in. Hammered dulcimers of various types are now very popular not only in China, but also Eastern Europe, the Middle East, India, Iran and Pakistan. These instruments are also sometimes known by the names "santoor" and "cimbalom" and also had an influence on the Khim (ขิม), a Thai classical instrument.

The yangqin was traditionally fitted with bronze strings, which gave the instrument a soft timbre. This form of instrument is still occasionally heard today in the hudie qin (蝴蝶琴; 'butterfly zither') played in the traditional silk and bamboo genre from the Shanghai region known as Jiangnan sizhu (江南絲竹), as well as in some Cantonese music and Chaozhou (Teochew) music groups. The Thai and Cambodian khim are nearly identical in their construction, having been introduced to those nations by southern Chinese musicians. Since the 1950s, however, steel alloy strings (in conjunction with copper-wound steel strings for the bass notes) have been used, in order to give the instrument a brighter, and louder tone. The modern yangqin can have as many as five courses of bridges and may be arranged chromatically. Traditional instruments, with three or more courses of bridges, are also still widely in use. The instrument's strings are struck with two lightweight bamboo beaters (also known as hammers) with rubber tips. A professional musician often carries several sets of beaters, each of which draws a slightly different tone from the instrument, much like the drum sticks of Western percussionists. The yangqin is used both as a solo instrument and in ensembles.

== Origins ==
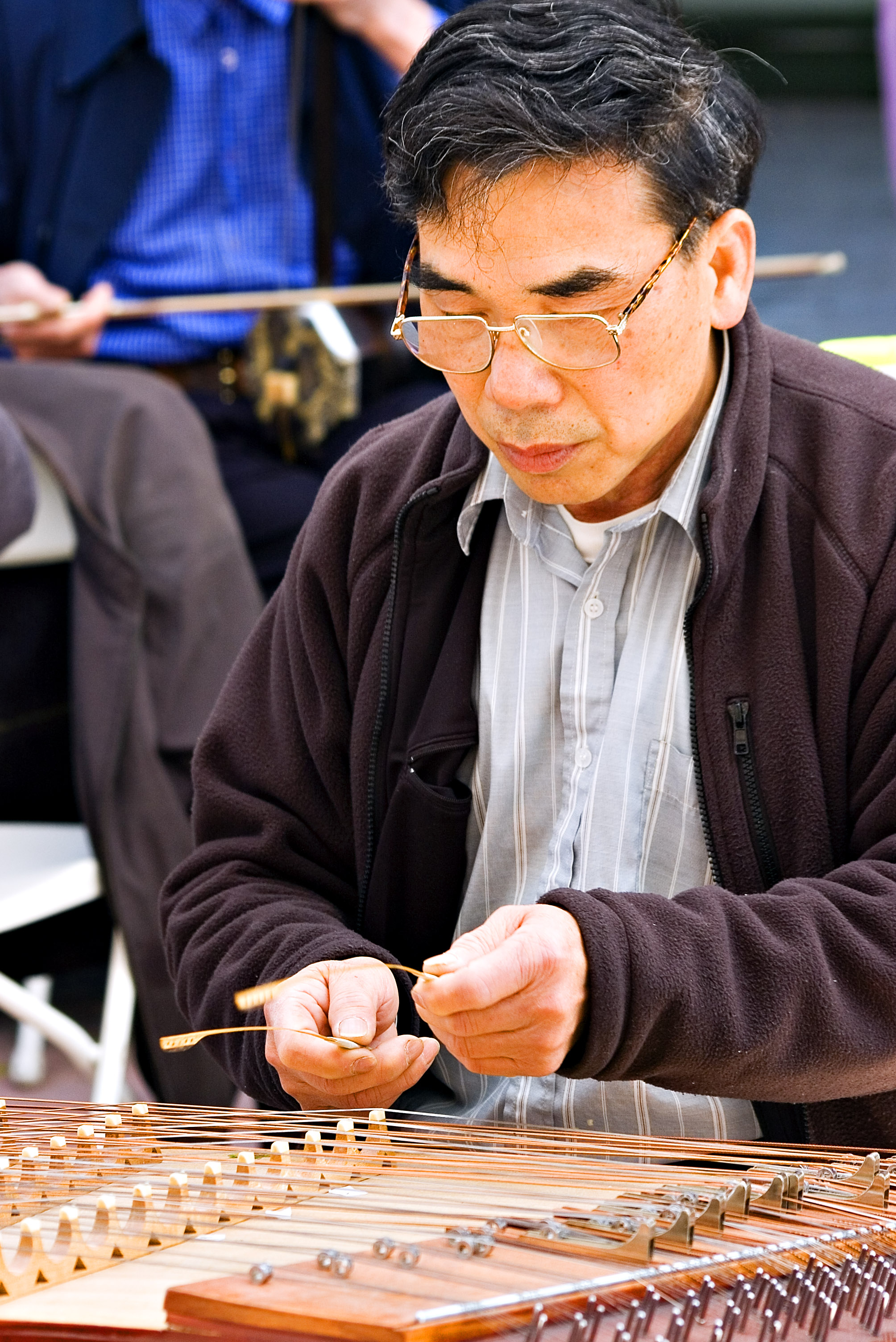
A musician playing a yangqin in a Cantonese street band in San Francisco.

Historians offer several theories to explain how the instrument was introduced to China:

1. that the instrument may have been introduced by land, through the Silk Road;
2. that it was introduced by sea, through the port of Guangzhou (Canton); or
3. that it was invented without foreign influence by the Chinese themselves.

The word "yangqin" has historically been written in two different ways, using different Chinese characters for "yang". The "yang" in the earlier version was written with the character 洋, meaning "foreign". It was later changed, in 1910, to the character "yang" (揚), meaning "acclaimed".

=== Theory of introduction by land ===
Another theory of how the yangqin came into contact with the Chinese is through the Silk Road from Mongolia. The Silk Route stretched almost 5,000 miles reaching from China to the Middle East, including Iran (Persia). The Iranian santur, a dulcimer, has existed since ancient times. If any dulcimer was to influence China by land, it is likely to be this instrument.

The technical structure of the santur is different in the way the tuning pegs are placed, the bridges and the mallets. The yangqin's tuning pins are set in parallel instead of a 90-degree angle down at the side. The mallets of the santur also differ from those of the yangqin – they are made of wood with finger grip, designed to let the players perform by gripping the two mallets between their fore and middle fingers. Both modern and earlier yangqin mallets did not include finger grips.

The bridge of the yangqin consist of long, single pieces of wood with many protruding "stubs" supporting the strings unlike the santur, which uses a number of small, individual chesspiece-like bridges.

=== Theory of introduction by sea ===
The port at Canton/Guangzhou attracts traders from all over Asia: from Japan, India, Southeast Asia, and the Middle East. The ships from this region bought back precious stones, slaves, exotic wares, fruits, spices, etc. Along with trade, businesses, ideas, philosophies and scientific knowledge were exchanged, including religion (principally Buddhism).

During the 16th century, the Age of Exploration in Europe reached its climax and soon trade was established between China and Europe. Historians state that Portuguese, and later, English and Dutch ships, had brisk trade with China. Portuguese trading in Chinese waters began in the 16th century according to historians. Music historians report that the salterio, a hammered dulcimer, was played in Portugal, Spain, and Italy during this period. Historians say it is possible that the yangqin originated when the Portuguese, the English or the Dutch brought a dulcimer player to China who performed for locals.

== Construction ==
As the yangqin is a type of hammered dulcimer, it shares many elements of construction with other instruments in the hammered dulcimer family:

=== Strings ===
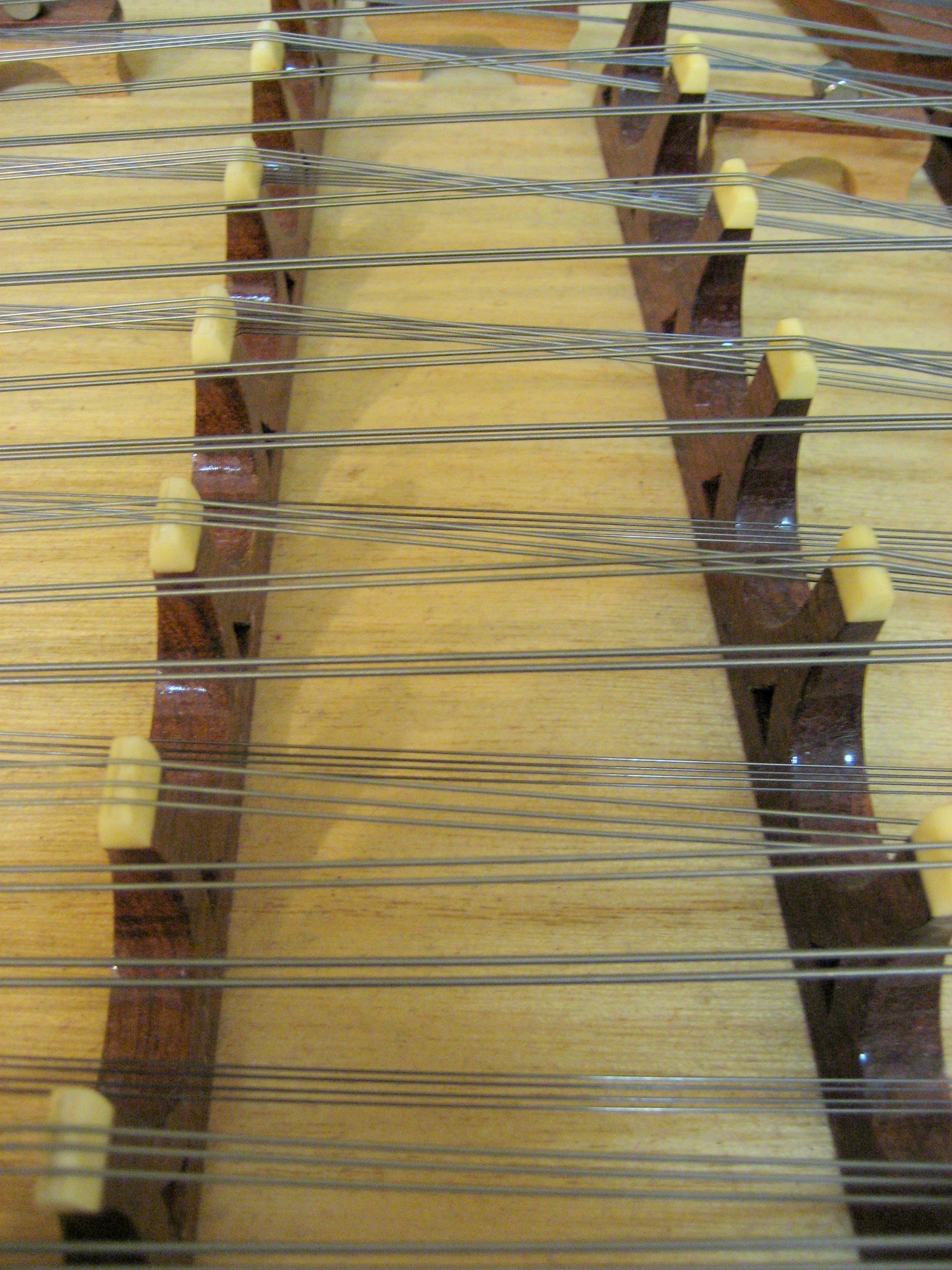
Bridges and strings of a yangqin. This particular image is of the lower strings, which are thicker and wound with copper.

Modern yangqin usually have 144 strings in total, with each pitch running in courses, with up to 5 strings per course, in order to boost the volume. The strings come in various thicknesses, and are tied at one end by screws, and at the other with tuning pegs. The pegs and screws are covered during playing by a hinged panel/board. This panel is opened up during tuning to access the tuning pegs.

=== Bridges ===
There are usually four to five bridges on a yangqin. From right to left, they are: bass bridge, "right bridge", tenor bridge, "left bridge", and the chromatic bridge. During playing, one is supposed to strike the strings on the left side of the bridges. However, the strings on the "chromatic bridge" are struck on the right, and strings on the "left bridge" can be struck on both sides of the bridge.

=== Hammers ===
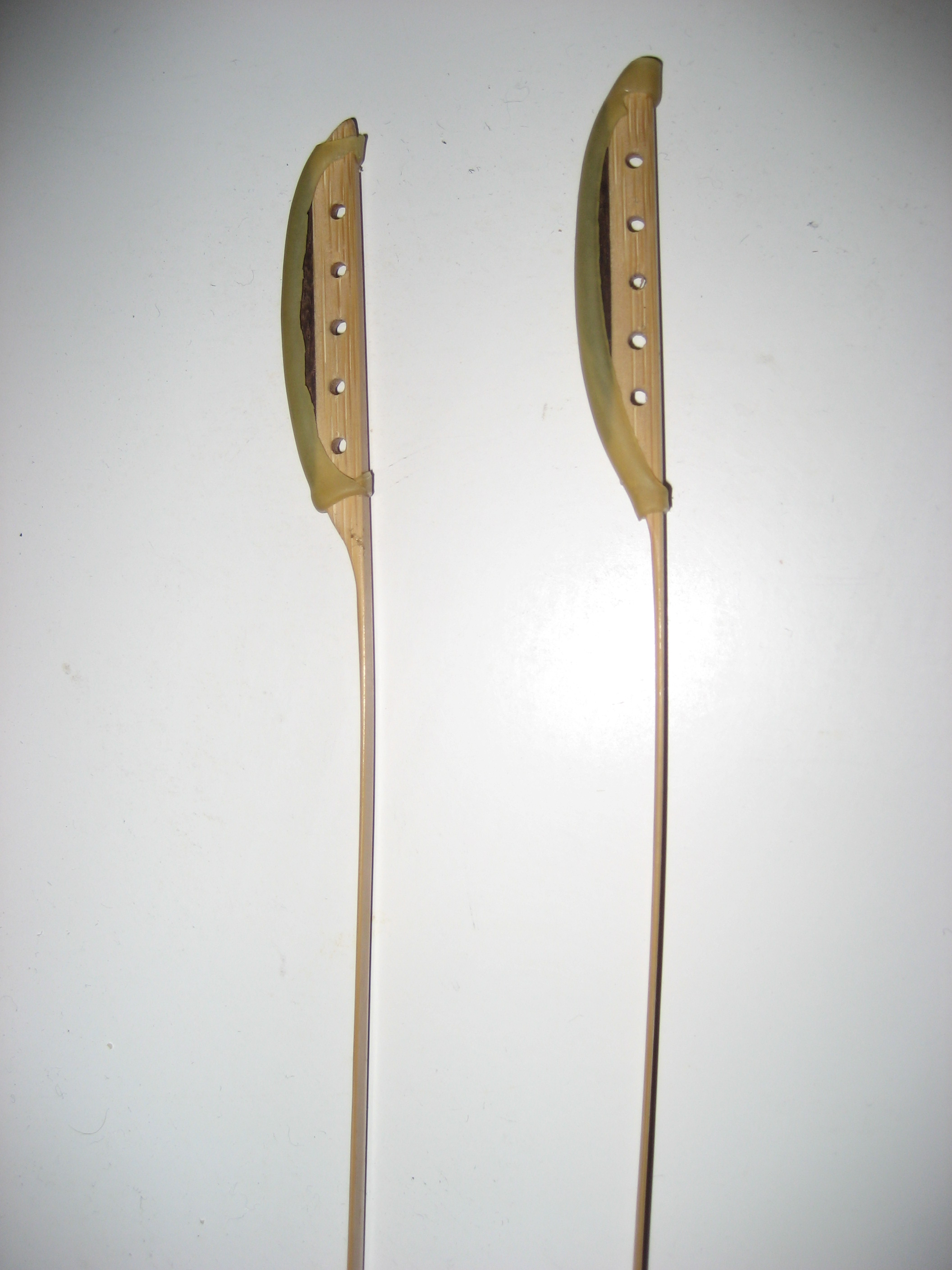
A pair of yangqin hammers.

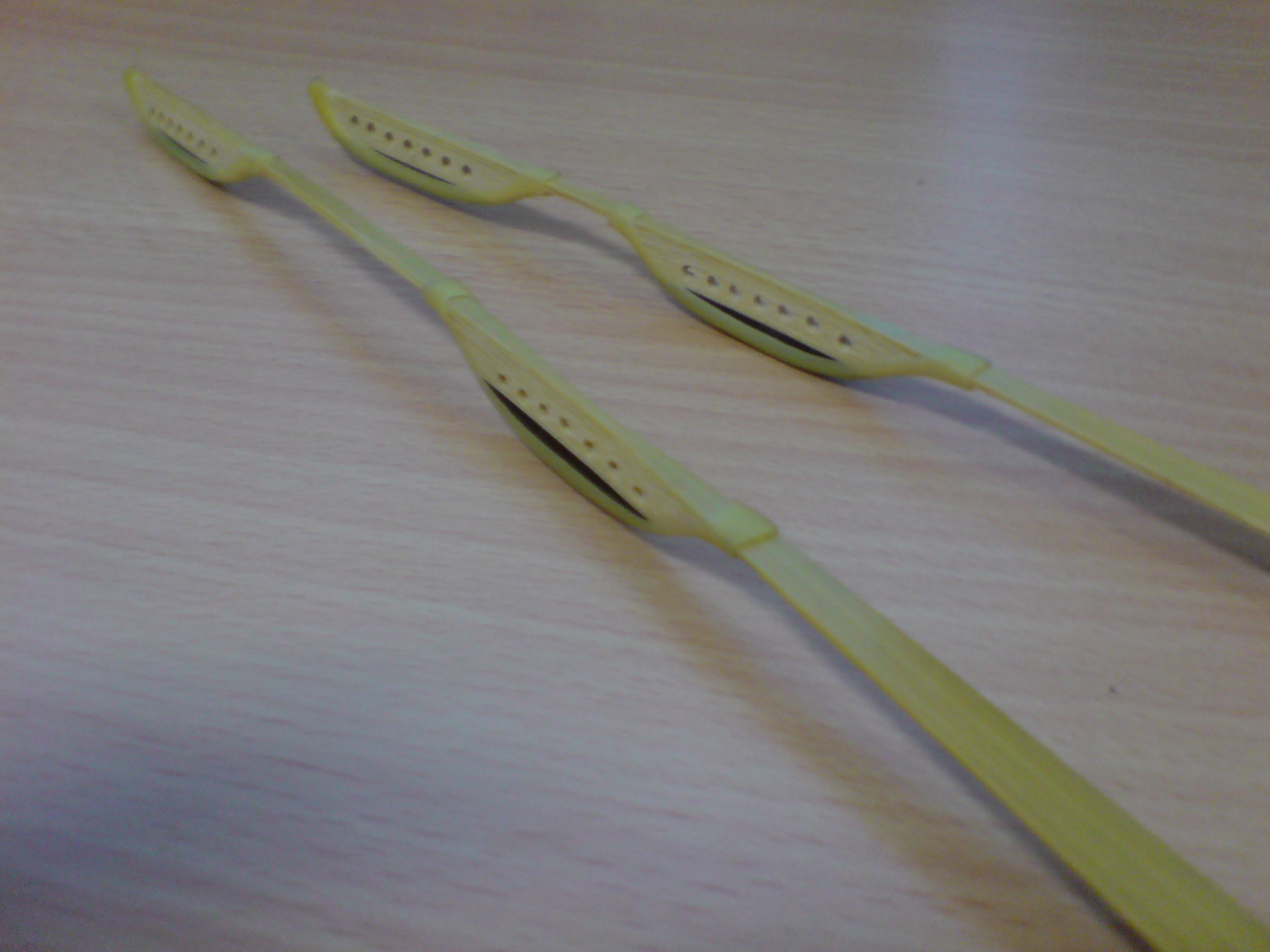
A pair of 雙音琴竹. The hammer on the left plays fourths, and the one on the right plays thirds.

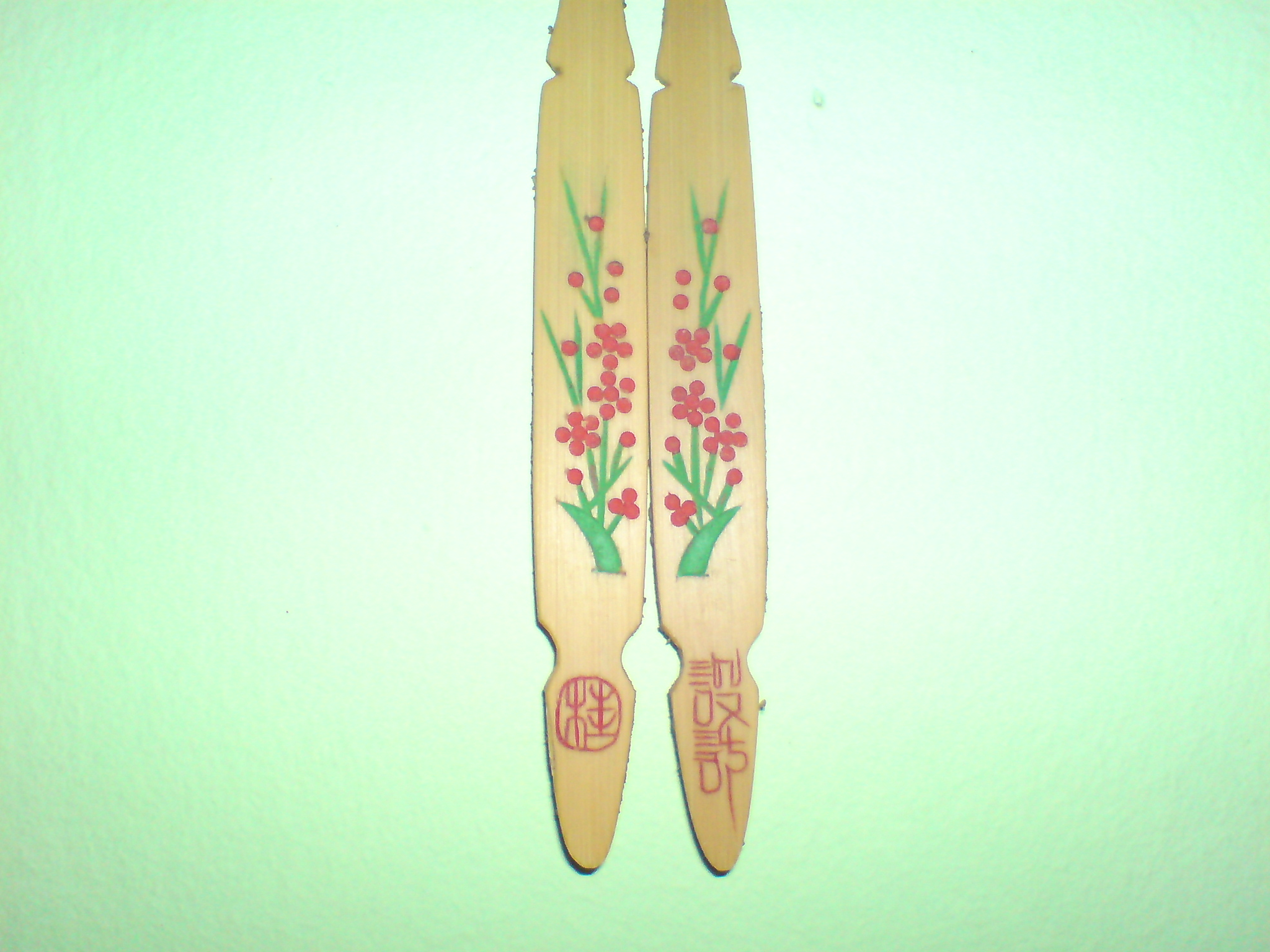
The bodies of a pair of yangqin hammers. The pointed ends of the sticks are used to pluck strings, producing a crisp, clear tone.

The hammers are made of flexible bamboo, and one end is half covered by rubber. Due to their unique construction, there are two ways to play: with the rubber side for a softer sound, and with the bamboo side for a crisper, more percussive sound. This technique, known as fǎnzhǔ (反竹), is best utilized in the higher ranges of the yangqin. Additionally, the ends of the sticks can be used to pluck the strings, producing a stinging, precise sound. Glissandos can also be achieved in this way by running the ends of the sticks up or down the strings.

Furthermore, some songs require the use of shuāng yīn qín zhǔ (雙音琴竹), literally "double-note yangqin hammers". These specially-constructed hammers have 2 striking surfaces, allowing the player to play up to 4 notes simultaneously (or even 8 notes, if the strings of the "left bridge" and "tenor bridge" are struck at a point where they intersect each other), resulting in a rich, powerful tone, which is especially pronounced in the lower registers due to the strings' long echoes. 林沖夜奔 ("Lin Chong Flees In The Night"), composed by 項祖華 (Xiang Zu Hua), is a representative solo piece which utilizes double-note hammers.

When using double-note hammers, the left hand holds a beater that plays intervals of a perfect fourth, while the right hand's beater plays thirds. These intervals are standard over most of the yangqin's range, due to the positioning of its strings.

=== Cylindrical nuts ===
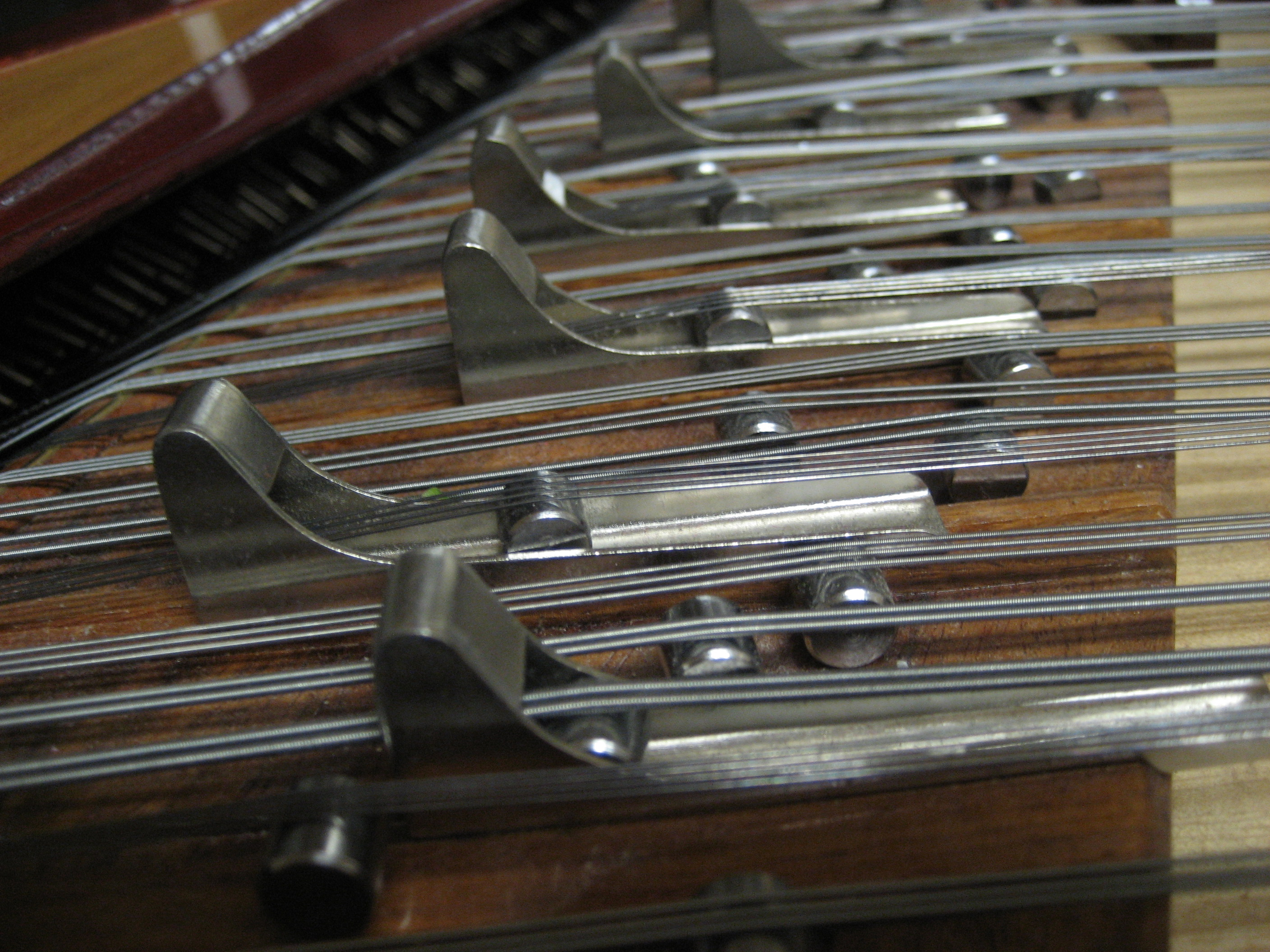
Cylindrical nuts, fitted into fine-tuning devices.

On both sides of the yangqin, aside from the tuning screws, are numerous cylindrical metal Nuts that can be moved for fine tuning the strings or to raise the strings slightly to eliminate unwanted vibrations that may occur. More modern designs also have moveable ball-shaped nuts that can be adjusted on the fly with the fingers; this provides some microtuning and additional dynamics during performances, such as portamentos and vibratos (see below: "Manner of Performance").

== Manner of performance ==
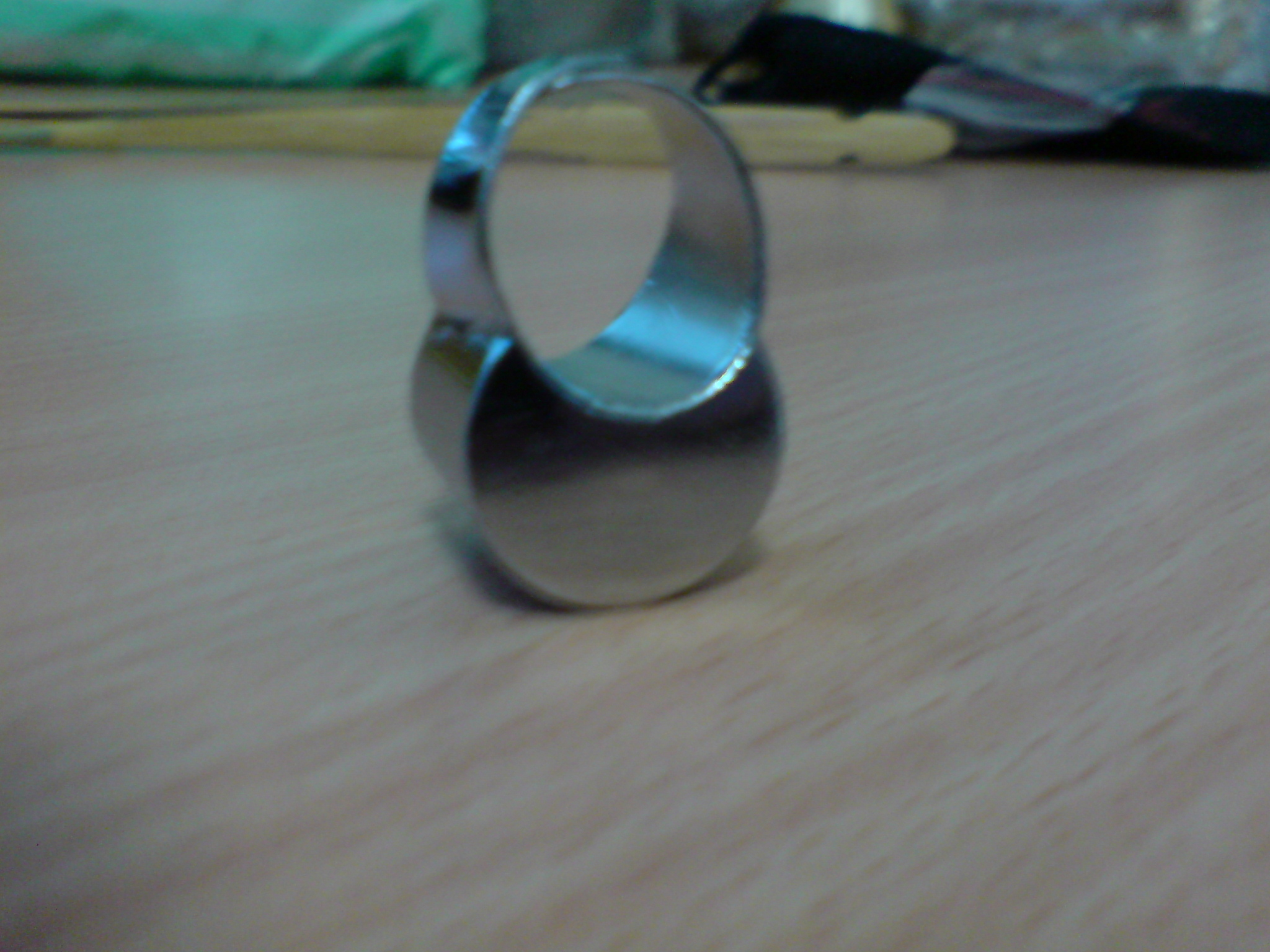
A metallic ring, with an attached weight, worn by yangqin performers to execute portamentos and vibratos.

The sticks are held, one in each hand, and hit the strings alternately. In the orchestra, the yangqin often adds to the harmony by playing chords or arpeggios. As the yangqin is softer than other Chinese instruments, it is usually positioned at the front of the orchestra, in the row just in front of the conductor. However, this is not a rule: the Singapore Chinese Orchestra positions the yangqin close to the percussion section. As the yangqin's tones sustain long after they have been played, such an arrangement minimizes the dissonance that results. If the hands are free (e.g. in periods of rest), covering the strings with the hands quickly dampens the vibrations. The yangqin has been called the "Chinese piano" as it has an indispensable role in the accompaniment of Chinese string and wind instruments.

The yangqin's solo repertoire calls for more techniques than is usually required in orchestral pieces. Examples include pressing down on the strings to produce vibrato effects, similar to that of a guzheng, as well as harmonics and 顫竹 (chàn zhǔ), which involves flicking the sticks lightly over the strings, causing them to vibrate, which results in a short, quick tremolo. Numerous other techniques, such as portamento – a glide from one note to another (accomplished through 2 methods, both involving the lengthening or shortening of strings: the first is by sliding the fine-tuning devices on the sides of the instrument by hand, and the second is by wearing a metallic "ring" – known as a 滑音指套 [huá yīn zhǐ tào] – and sliding it along the length of the indicated string) – are also used.

== Arrangement of pitches ==
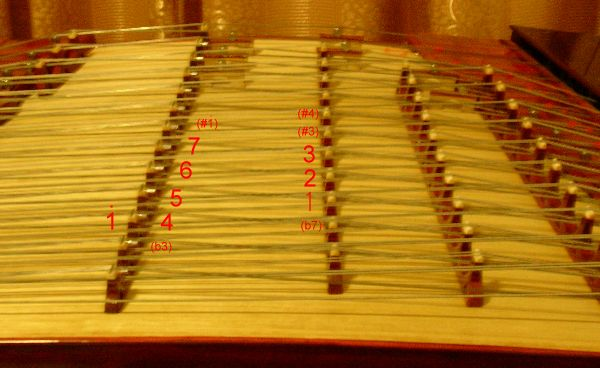
Scale of yangqin, the numbers indicate the notes in the diatonic scale, 1 = do, 2 = re etc.

The yangqin is a chromatic instrument with a range of slightly over four octaves. Middle C is located on the tenor bridge, third course from the bottom.

The pitches are arranged so that in general, moving one section away from the player's body corresponds to a transposition of a whole tone upwards. Similarly, moving one section towards the left of the performer generally corresponds to a transposition of a perfect fifth upwards. These are only rules of thumb since the arrangement has to be modified towards the extremes of the pitch range to fill out notes in the chromatic scale. Such an arrangement facilitates transposition.

In the playing of traditional Chinese music, most Chinese yangqin players use a numerical notation system called jianpu, rather than Western staff notation.

== See also ==
- Santur
- Hammered dulcimer
- Music of Bhutan
- Traditional Chinese musical instruments
