= Guangdong music (genre) =

Traditional Chinese music genre

Guangdong music, also known as Cantonese music (廣東音樂 Jyutping: gwong2dung1 jam1ngok6, Yale: gwóng-dūng yām-ngohk, Pinyin: Guǎngdōng yīnyuè) is a style of traditional Chinese instrumental music from Guangzhou and surrounding areas in Pearl River Delta of Guangdong Province on the southern coast of China. The name of the music is not an accurate description because Guangdong music is not the only music of the whole Guangdong area. Cantonese classical music especially were usually much livelier in pace and happier than those of other China provinces which is typical and the very essence of the Cantonese's character. In Guangdong, there are numerous traditional genres of music such as Teochew music and Hakka music (Hakka Hanyue and sixian). The name of the music originated in the 1920 and 1930s when the music was popular in Shanghai ballrooms in the form of "Spiritual Music" (精神音樂, Jīngshěn Yīnyuè; more properly translated as "spirited music"). As the performers were almost entirely from Guangdong, Shanghai people generalized the form of music as Guangdong music. Musically, compositions are based on tunes derived from Cantonese opera, together with new compositions from the 1920s onwards. Some pieces have influences from jazz and Western music, using syncopation and triple time, and incorporating instruments such as the saxophone, violin, guitar, piano, drum set, or xylophone.

== Instrumentation ==
The gaohu is the most common lead instrument used in performing Cantonese music. It was invented by Lü Wencheng (吕文成, 1898–1981) in the 1920s. Prior to this, the erxian was the most common lead bowed string instrument in the Cantonese ensemble. Ensembles led by the erxian and also featuring the tiqin are called yinggong (硬弓, literally "hard bow") ensembles, while those led by the gaohu are called ruangong (软弓, literally "soft bow") because the erxian and tiqin have thick bamboo bows, while the gaohu has a thinner, flexible bow.

Guangdong music gradually evolved into a string ensemble format by the 1960s, led by the gaohu with ruan, qinqin, yangqin, sanxian, yehu, tiqin and various woodwind (including houguan) and percussion instruments. Alto saxophone, xylophone, violin, piano, electric guitar, and drum set may also be used, in combination with traditional instruments.

== Composers ==
- He Liutang (何柳堂, 1874–1933)
- Lü Wencheng (吕文成, 1898－1981)
- Qiu Hechou (丘鶴儔, 1880–1942)
- Yan Laolie (嚴老烈, c. 1850-c. 1930)
- He Yunian (何与年, 1880 or 1881-1962)

== Compositions ==
- Baihua Ting Nao Jiu《百花亭鬧酒》(Drinking Uproariously at the Hundred-Flowers Pavilion) - anonymous
- Bu Bu Gao《步步高》(Stepping Higher and Higher) - by Lü Wencheng
- E Ma Yao Ling《餓馬搖鈴》(Hungry Horse Shakes Its Bell) - possibly by He Liutang
- Han Tian Lei《旱天雷》(Thunder in the Drought) - by Yan Laolie
- Jiao Shi Ming Qin《蕉石鳴琴》(Playing the Qin by the Plantain-Shaped Stones) - by Lü Wencheng
- Ping Hu Qiu Yue《平湖秋月》(Autumn Moon Over the Calm Lake) - by Lü Wencheng
- Qing Mei Zhu Ma《青梅竹馬》(Childhood Sweethearts) - by Lü Wencheng
- Sailong Duojin《賽龍奪錦》(Grabbing the Flag at the Dragon Boat Race) - by He Liutang
- Xiao Tao Hong《小桃红》(Little Peach, [Blossoming] Red) - anonymous
- Yu Da Ba Jiao《雨打芭蕉》(Rain Tapping on the Plantains) - possibly by He Liutang
- Yu Ge Wan Chang《漁歌晚唱》(Fisherman Singing His Song in the Evening) - by Lü Wencheng
- Yu Le Sheng Ping《娛樂昇平》(Merriment in a Time of Peace) - by Qiu Hechou

== Audio samples ==
Ping Hu Qiu Yue
Sample of "Ping Hu Qiu Yue" (平湖秋月, Autumn Moon On Calm Lake). Composed by Lü Wencheng. Gaohu solo played by Yu Qiwei, with guzheng accompaniment.)

Jiao shi ming qin
Sample of "Jiao shi ming qin" (蕉石鳴琴 Playing the qin by banana rock). Composed by Lü Wencheng, played by a small ensemble of five instruments, gaohu played by Yu Qiwei.

== See also ==
- Guangdong Chinese Orchestra
