= Stringed instrument tunings =

Tunings for stringed musical instruments

This is a chart of stringed instrument tunings. Instruments are listed alphabetically by their most commonly known name.

== Terminology ==
A course may consist of one or more strings.

Courses are listed reading from left to right facing the front of the instrument, with the instrument standing vertically. On a majority of instruments, this places the notes from low to high pitch. Exceptions exist:

- Instruments using reentrant tuning (e.g., the charango) may have a high string before a low string.
- Instruments strung in the reverse direction (e.g., mountain dulcimer) are noted with the highest sounding courses on the left and the lowest to the right.
- A few instruments exist in "right-hand" and "left-hand" versions; left-handed instruments are not included here as separate entries, as their tuning is identical to the right-hand version, but with the strings in reverse order (e.g., a left-handed guitar).

Strings within a course are also given from left to right, facing the front of the instrument, with it standing vertically. Single-string courses are separated by spaces; multiple-string courses (i.e. paired or tripled strings) are shown with courses separated by bullet characters (•).

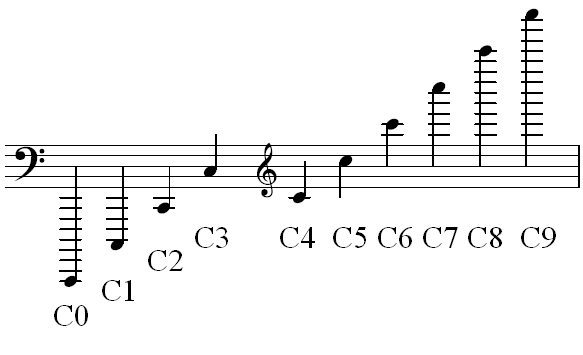
Scientific pitch notation

Pitch: Unless otherwise noted, contemporary western standard pitch (A_{4} = 440 Hz) and 12-tone equal temperament are assumed.

Octaves are given in scientific pitch notation, with Middle C written as "C_{4}". (The 'A' above Middle C would then be written as "A_{4}"; the next higher octave begins on "C_{5}"; the next lower octave on "C_{3}"; etc.)

Because stringed instruments are easily re-tuned, the concept of a "standard tuning" is somewhat flexible. Some instruments:

- have a designated standard tuning (e.g., violin; guitar)
- have more than one tuning considered "standard" (e.g., mejorana, ukulele)
- do not have a standard tuning but rather a "common" tuning that is used more frequently than others (e.g., banjo; lap steel guitar)
- are typically re-tuned to suit the music being played or the voice being accompanied and have no set "standard" at all (e.g., đàn nguyệt; Appalachian dulcimer)

Where more than one common tuning exists, the most common is given first and labeled "Standard" or "Standard/common". Other tunings will then be given under the heading "Alternates".

== A ==
Instrument	Strings & Courses	Tuning(s)	Alternative Names	Origin	Notes	Picture
Ahenk	12 strings 6 courses	Standard/common: A_{3} A_{3}•B_{3} B_{3}•E_{4} E_{4}•A_{4} A_{4}•D_{5} D_{5}•G_{5} G_{5} Alternates: May also use various oud tunings		Turkey		
Ajayu	12 strings 5 courses	Standard/common: A A•E E•A A•C♯ C♯ C♯•F♯ F♯ F♯ Alternate: C C•G G•C C•E E E•A A A		Chile	A very recent instrument, invented in 2007	
Akkordolia	4 strings 4 courses	F_{2} A_{2} C_{3} F_{3}	Taishogoto, Bulbul tarang, Benju	Germany & Austria / Japan / India / Pakistan	There are also a number of drone strings, the number and tuning of which vary widely.	
Akonting	3 courses 3 strings	Common: Casamance: D_{3} G_{3} F_{4} Gambian: C_{3} F_{3} E_{4}	Ekonting, Bunchundo, Econtin, Konting	Senegal	Often strung with fishing line. A rare 4-string version also exists.	
Amzad	1 string 1 course	No standard tuning; tuned to any convenient note.	Imzad	Niger, Mali, Algeria	Horse hair string.	
Archlute	27 strings 14 courses	F_{1} F_{2}•G_{1} G_{2}•A_{1} A_{2}•B_{1} B_{2}•C_{2} C_{3}• D_{2} D_{3}•E_{2} E_{3}•F_{2} F_{3}•G_{2} G_{2}•C_{2} C_{2}• F_{3} F_{3}•A_{3} A_{3}•D_{4} D_{4}•G_{4}	Arciliuto, Erzlaute	Europe	Number of courses could vary from 11–14, and the number of strings from 21–27.	12-course, 23-string archlute:
Armonico	7 strings 6 courses	E_{3}•A_{3}•D_{4}•G_{4} G_{4}•B_{3}•E_{4}		Cuba		
Arpeggione	6 strings 6 courses	E_{2} A_{2} D_{3} G_{3} B_{3} E_{4}		Vienna, Austria	Rare. Tuning is same as guitar.	
Autoharp	36 strings 36 courses	F_{2} G_{2} C_{3} D_{3} E_{3} F_{3} F♯_{3} G_{3} A_{3} A♯_{3} B_{3} C_{4} C♯_{4} D_{4} D♯_{4} E_{4} F_{4} F♯_{4} G_{4} G♯_{4} A_{4} A♯_{4} B_{4} C_{5} C♯_{5} D_{5} D♯_{5} E_{5} F_{5} F♯_{5} G_{5} G♯_{5} A_{5} A♯_{5} B_{5} C_{6}	Chord zither	USA	Instruments with additional strings exist (from 37 – 48 total strings), but are very rare.	

== B ==
Instrument	Strings & Courses	Tuning(s)	Alternative Names	Origin	Notes	Picture
Baglama	7 strings 3 courses	top to bottom: G_{2} G_{3}•D_{3} D_{3}•A_{2} A_{3} A_{3}	Bağlama, Saz, Tanbura, Çöğür	Turkey	See Bağlama	
Baglamas	6 strings 3 courses	D_{4} D_{5}•A_{4} A_{4}•D_{5} D_{5}	Baglama, Baglama Saz, Baglamadaki	Greece	Standard aka "Modal D"	
Bajo quinto	10 strings 5 courses	A_{2} A_{1}•D_{3} D_{2}•G_{2} G_{2}•C_{3} C_{3}•F_{3} F_{3}		Mexico	True 10-string bajo quintos are made, but many so-called "bajo quintos" are really bajo sextos with the lowest course removed.	
Bajo sexto	12 strings 6 courses	Standard/common (all fourths): E_{2} E_{1}•A_{2} A_{1}•D_{3} D_{2}•G_{2} G_{2}•C_{3} C_{3}•F_{3} F_{3} Alternate: Guitar (aka Solo Tuning, or Bass VI Tuning): E_{2} E_{1}•A_{2} A_{1}•D_{3} D_{2}•G_{2} G_{2}•B_{2} B_{2}•E_{3} E_{3}		Mexico	In practice the bottom course (2 strings) is often removed, making the instrument effectively a bajo quinto.	
Balalaika, alto	3 strings 3 courses	E_{3} E_{3} A_{3}	Alto	Russia	See Ekkel (1997) for all Balalaika tunings.	
Balalaika, bass	3 strings 3 courses	Standard: E_{2} A_{2} D_{3} Old orchestral: E_{2} A_{2} E_{3}	Bass	Russia		
Balalaika, contrabass	3 strings 3 courses	Standard: E_{1} A_{1} D_{2} Old orchestral: E_{1} A_{1} E_{2}	Contrabass	Russia		
Balalaika, descant	3 strings 3 courses	E_{5} E_{5} A_{5}	Descant	Russia	Obsolete	
Balalaika, piccolo	3 strings 3 courses	Standard: B_{4} E_{5} A_{5} Old orchestral: E_{4} A_{4} E_{5}	Piccolo	Russia	Rare	
Balalaika, prima	3 strings 3 courses	Standard/common: E_{4} E_{4} A_{4} Alternates: Folk: C_{4} E_{4} G_{4}; Russian guitar: G_{3} B_{3} D_{4}	Prima	Russia	This is the standard instrument of the balalaika family	
Balalaika, prima, 6-string	6 strings 3 courses	Standard: E_{4} E_{4} • E_{4} E_{4} • A_{4} A_{4} Alternates: Same as for 3-string prima	Prima	Russia	A more recent development, professionals consider these inferior to 3-string instruments.	
Balalaika, secunda	3 strings 3 courses	A_{3} A_{3} D_{4}	Secunda	Russia	Often just a prima with altered tuning, though slightly larger secundas are also made.	
Balalaika, tenor	3 strings 3 courses	A_{2} A_{2} D_{3}	Tenor	Russia	Obsolete	
Bandola Andina Colombiana	16 strings 6 courses	F♯_{3} F♯_{3}•B_{3} B_{3}•E_{4} E_{4} E_{4}•A_{4} A_{4} A_{4}•D_{5} D_{5} D_{5}•G_{5} G_{5} G_{5}		Colombia		
Bandola Llanera	4 strings 4 courses	A_{2} D_{3} A_{3} E_{4}		Venezuela		
Bandola Oriental	8 strings 4 courses	G_{3} G_{3}•D_{4} D_{4}•A_{4} A_{4}•E_{5} E_{5}		Venezuela		
Bandolin	15 strings 5 courses	E_{5} E_{4} E_{5}•A_{5} A_{4} A_{5}•D_{5} D_{5} D_{5}•F♯_{5} F♯_{5} F♯_{5}•B_{5} B_{5} B_{5}		Ecuador		
Bandurria, Philippine	14 strings 6 courses	F♯_{3}•B_{3} B_{3}•E_{4} E_{4}•A_{4} A_{4} A_{4}•D_{5} D_{5} D_{5}•G_{5} G_{5} G_{5}		Philippines	One octave higher than the Philippine laud.	
Bandurria, Spanish	12 strings 6 courses	G♯_{3} G♯_{3}•C♯_{4} C♯_{4}•F♯_{4} F♯_{4}•B_{4} B_{4}•E_{5} E_{5}•A_{5} A_{5}		Spain	Standard tuning aka "Spanish tuning", one octave higher than the laud.	
Banjo, bass	4 strings 4 courses	E_{1} A_{1} D_{2} G_{2}		US	The Cello banjo is sometimes called "bass banjo", but it is tuned differently, and there are true bass banjos as well.	
Banjo, cello	4 strings 4 courses	C_{2} G_{2} D_{3} A_{3}	"Bass" banjo	US	Same as used for the cello.	
Banjo, cello	5 strings 5 courses	G_{3} D_{2} G_{2} B_{2} D_{3}	Banjo cello	US	One octave lower than 5-string bluegrass banjo.	
Banjo, contrabass	3 strings 3 courses	Standard/common: E_{1} A_{1} D_{2} Alternates: D_{1} G_{1} C_{2}; D_{1} A_{1} D_{2}; C_{1} G_{1} C_{2}		US	Essentially in the same range as the bass banjo, but with a much larger resonator. These instruments are very rare, and tuning is not standardized.	
Banjo (5-string)	5 strings 5 courses	Standard/common: G_{4} D_{3} G_{3} B_{3} D_{4} Alternates: C tuning: G_{4} C_{3} G_{3} B_{3} D_{4}; Double C: G_{4} C_{3} G_{3} C_{4} D_{4}; Sawmill: G_{4} D_{3} G_{3} C_{4} D_{4}; Open D: F♯_{4} D_{3} F♯_{3} A_{3} D_{4}; Guitar: G_{4} D_{3} G_{3} B_{3} E_{4}; Willie Moore: G_{4} D_{3} G_{3} A_{3} D_{4}; Doc Bog's D: F♯_{4} D_{3} G_{3} A_{3} D_{4}; Cumberland Gap:G_{4} E_{3} A_{3} D_{4} E_{4}; G Minor: G_{4} D_{3} G_{3} B♭_{3} D_{4}; Open C: G_{4} C_{3} G_{3} C_{4} E_{4}	Bluegrass Banjo	US via Africa	Standard aka "Open G"; Sawmill aka "mountain modal"; Open D aka "Graveyard," "Reuben"; Guitar aka "Old G," "Sandy River Belle"; There are dozens of other, less common tunings.	
Banjolele	4 strings 4 courses	Standard/common: G_{4} C_{4} E_{4} A_{4} Alternate (traditional): A_{4} D_{4} F♯_{4} B_{4}; Baritone: D_{3}: G_{3}: B_{3}: E_{4}	Banjo ukulele, banjo uke, banjelele, banjulele	US	Hybrid of banjo and ukulele. Same tuning as a ukulele of the same scale.	
Banjolin	4 strings 4 courses	G_{3} D_{4} A_{4} E_{5}	Mandolin-banjo, Melody Banjo, banjoline, bandoline	US	Hybrid of mandolin and banjo but with only one string per course	
Banjo, Long Neck	5 strings 5 courses	E_{4} B_{2} E_{3} G♯_{3} B_{3}	"Pete Seeger" Banjo	US (commissioned by Pete Seeger)	Open string tuning; often played with capo on 3rd fret	
Banjo, tenor	4 strings 4 courses	Standard/common (all fifths): C_{3} G_{3} D_{4} A_{4} Alternate: Irish (all fifths): G_{2} D_{3} A_{3} E_{4}		US via Africa	Irish tuning same as octave mandolin tuning	
Banjo, Plectrum	4 strings 4 courses	C_{3} G_{3} B_{3} D_{4} Chicago Tuning: D_{3} G_{3} B_{3} E_{4}		US via Africa		
Baryton	17 strings 17 courses Two ranks	Bowed rank: A_{1} D_{2} G_{3} C_{3} E_{3} A_{3} D_{4} Plucked rank: A_{2} D_{3} E_{3} F♯_{3} G_{3} A_{3} B_{3} C♯_{3} D_{4} E_{4}		Europe (Germany?)	Seven bowed strings, and 10 resonating strings, also plucked with the left thumb	
Basprim		(See Brac, 5 string)				(See Brac, 5 string)
Bass guitar		(See Guitar, bass)				(See Guitar, bass)
Berimbau	1 string 1 course	[*]		Brazil	* No standard tuning,	
Biscernica, 5 string	5 strings 4 courses	C♯_{3}•F♯_{3}•B_{3}•E_{4} E_{4}	Bisernica	Balkans	The prim has 5 strings; there is another bisernica which has 6 strings.	
Bisernica, 6 string	6 strings 4 courses	E_{3}•A_{3}•D_{4} D_{4}•G_{4} G_{4}	Tamburitza	Croatia, Serbia, Hungary, Slovenia	Other courses are sometimes doubled.	
Bordonua	10 strings 5 courses	A_{2} A_{3}•D_{4} D_{3}•F♯_{3} F♯_{4}•B_{3} B_{3}•E_{4} E_{4}		Puerto Rico		
Bouzouki	8 strings 4 courses	C_{3} C_{4}•F_{3} F_{4}•A_{3} A_{3}•D_{4} D_{4}	Tetrachordo bouzouki	Greece	Standard aka "F_{6} tuning"	
Bouzouki	6 strings 3 courses	D_{3} D_{4}•A_{3} A_{3}•D_{4} D_{4}	Trichordo bouzouki	Greece	Standard aka "F_{6} tuning"	
Bouzouki, Irish		( See Irish bouzouki )				( See Irish bouzouki )
Brac, 5 string	5 strings 4 courses	Standard/common: E_{3}•A_{3}•D_{4}•G_{4} G_{4} Alternate: F♯_{3}•B_{3}•E_{4}•A_{4} A_{4}	Basprim, Brach	Croatia, Serbia, Slovenia		
Brac, 6 string	6 strings 4 courses	G_{3} G_{3}•D_{4} D_{4}•A_{4} A_{4}	Brach	Croatia, Serbia, Slovenia		
Braguinha	4 strings 4 courses	D_{4} G_{4} B_{4} D_{5}	Braguinã, Cavaquinho, Machete de braga	Madeira, Portugal	Standard aka "Banjo tuning" (octave higher than the plectrum banjo)	
Bugarija, 5 string	5 strings 4 courses	Standard/common: G_{2}•B_{2}•D_{3}•G_{3} G_{3} Alternates: D_{2}•F♯_{2}•A_{2}•D_{3} D_{3}; E_{2}•G♯_{2}•B_{2}•E_{3} E_{3}	Kontra	Croatia, Serbia, Slovenia	First course is sometimes not doubled.	
Bugarija, 6 string	6 strings 4 courses	Standard/common: G_{2}•B_{2}•D_{3} D_{3}•G_{3} G_{3} Alternates: D_{2}•F♯_{2}•A_{2} A_{2}•D_{3} D_{3}; E_{2}•G♯_{2}•B_{2} B_{2}•E_{3} E_{3}	Kontra	Croatia, Serbia, Slovenia		

== C ==
Instrument	Strings & Courses	Tuning(s)	Alternative Names	Origin	Notes	Picture
Cak	4 strings 3 courses	D_{5} D_{5} • G_{4} • B_{4}	Steel kroncong guitar	Indonesia		
Cavaquinho	4 strings 4 courses	Standard/common: D_{4} G_{4} B_{4} D_{5} Alternates: 'Guitar': D_{4} G_{4} B_{4} E_{5}; Alternative: G_{4} C_{5} B_{4} D_{5}; Alternative: A_{4} A_{4} C♯_{5} E_{5}	Cavaco, Manchete, Machimbo	Portugal		
Cello	4 strings 4 courses	Standard/common: C_{2} G_{2} D_{3} A_{3} Alternates: "5th Suite" tuning: C_{2} G_{2} D_{3} G_{3}	Violoncello	Europe	Many scordatura tunings have been employed by various composers for individual pieces, for example: "Zoltán Kodály" tuning: B_{1} F♯_{2} D_{3} A_{3}: "Whole step down" tuning: B♭_{1} F_{2} C_{3} G_{3}	
Celo	4 strings		Celovic celloses ginga	Croatia Serbia Slovenia	This is the modern instrument	
Čelovič, 4 string	4 strings 4 courses	E_{2} A_{2} D_{3} G_{3}	Celo, Csello, Cselo	Croatia, Serbia, Slovenia	This is the modern instrument again	
Čelovič, Farkas	6 strings 4 courses	D_{2}•G_{2}•C_{3} C_{3}•G_{3} G_{3}	Celo, Csello, Cselo	Croatia, Serbia, Slovenia	The traditional 19th century instrument, developed by Jankovic Farkas, now virtually obsolete.	
Cetera	16 strings 8 courses	Standard/common: C_{3} C_{3}•D_{3} D_{3}•E♭_{3} E♭_{3}•F_{3} F_{3}•G_{3} G_{3}•G_{3} G_{3}•D_{4} D_{4}•G_{4} G_{4} Alternate: Renaissance: G_{2} G_{2}•A_{2} A_{2}•C_{3} C_{3}•D_{3} D_{3}•A_{3} A_{3}•G_{3} G_{3}•D_{4} D_{4}•E_{4} E_{4}		Corsica, France.		
Chanzy	3 strings 3 courses	Standard/common: F_{2} C_{3} F_{3} Alternates: D_{2} A_{2} D_{3}; C_{2} G_{2} C_{3}	Chanzi, Tyanzi	Tuva, Russia		
Chapey	3 strings 2 courses	F_{3} F_{3} • B_{3}	Chapei, Chapei Dong Veng	Cambodia		
Chapman Stick	10 strings 10 courses	E_{3} A_{2} D_{2} G_{1} C_{1} F♯_{2} B_{2} E_{3} A_{3} D_{4}	Stick, The Stick, Classic Stick	United States	There are many alternate tunings, which vary from individual to individual	
Chapman Stick, Grand Stick	12 strings 12 courses	B_{3} E_{3} A_{2} D_{2} G_{1} C_{1} C♯_{2} F♯_{2} B_{2} E_{3} A_{3} D_{4}	Stick, The Stick, Grand Stick	United States	There are many alternates, which vary from individual to individual	
Charango	10 strings 5 courses	Standard/common: G_{4} G_{4}•C_{5} C_{5}•E_{5} E_{4}•A_{4} A_{4}•E_{5} E_{5} Alternates: Argentine tuning: C_{4} C_{4}•F_{4} F_{4}•A_{4} A_{3}•D_{4} D_{4}•A_{4} A_{4}: Gm7/B♭_{6} Tuning: F_{4} F_{4}•B♭_{5} B♭_{5}•C_{5} C_{4}•G_{4} G_{4}•D_{5} D_{5}	Quirquincho, Mulita, Tatu, Kirki	Bolivia, Peru, Argentina Chile, Ecuador	Common C_{6}/Am7 or "Bolivian" tuning, but there are many variants. 3rd course is an octave pair.	
Charango, Hatun	7 or 8 strings 6 or 7 courses	(A_{3}) • D_{4} • G_{4} • C_{5} • E_{5} E_{4} • A_{4} • E_{5}	Grand Charango, Hatun Charango, Peruvian Charango	Peru	A recent addition to the charango family.	
Charangón	10 strings 5 courses	Standard/common: D_{4} D_{4}•G_{4} G_{4}•B_{4} B_{3}•E_{4} E_{4}•B_{4} B_{4} Alternates: C_{6} Tuning; G_{3} G_{3}•C_{4} C_{4}•E_{4} E_{3}•A_{3} A_{3}•E_{4} E_{4}: Bass G; G_{3} G_{2}•C_{4} C_{3}•E_{4} E_{3}•A_{3} A_{3}•E_{4} E_{4}: Bolivian tuning: C_{4} C_{4}•F_{4} F_{4}•A_{4} A_{3}•D_{4} D_{4}•A_{4} A_{4}	Tenor Charango, "Bass" Charango	Andean Region	Standard aka "Argentine tuning" or "G_{6} tuning", one fourth lower than the charango. Very similar in appearance to the charango, but slightly larger.	
Charango, Ranka	11 strings 5 courses	G_{4} G_{4}•C_{5} C_{5}•E_{5} E_{4}•A_{4} A_{4}•E_{5} E_{5} E_{6}•D_{4} D_{4}•A_{4} A_{4}•G_{5} G_{4}•C_{5} C_{5}•G_{5} G_{5} G_{6}	Patasi Charango, Ranqha Charango	Cochabamba, Bolivia		
Chillador	10 strings 5 courses	Standard/common: G_{3} G_{3}•C_{4} C_{4}•E_{4} E_{3}•A_{3} A_{3}•E_{4} E_{4} Alternates: Same as charango		Andean mountains	Essentially a flat-backed charango	
Chitarra battente	10 strings 5 courses	A_{3} A_{3}•D_{4} D_{4}•G_{3} G_{3}•B_{3} B_{3}•E_{4} E_{4}		Italy		
Chonguri	4 strings 4 courses	Standard/common: D_{2} F_{2} D_{3} A_{2} Alternate:[*]: F_{3} A_{3} F_{4} C_{4}	Chaghyr, Chagur, Chugur, Choghur, Chungur, Chunguri	Georgia	[*]There are many tuning variations. Note that both examples here are re-entrant.	
Çiftelia	2 strings 2 courses	B_{3} E_{4}		Albania	Common tuning, there are variants.	
Cimbalom	[*] about 125 strings about 53 courses	A_{2} A♯_{2} B_{2} C_{3} C♯_{3} D_{3} D♯_{3} E_{3} F_{3} F♯_{3} G_{3} G♯_{3} [...] * A♯_{5} B_{5} C_{6} C♯_{6} D_{6} D♯_{6} E_{6} F_{6} F♯_{6} G_{6} G♯_{6} A_{6}	Cimbál, cymbalom, cymbalum, ţambal, tsymbaly and tsimbl, santur, santouri, sandouri	Hungary	* String number varies with size of instrument; bass courses are usually triple strung and higher courses typically quadruple strung. Range given is for a Concert Grand; other sizes with smaller, and with more extended ranges exist. Only lowest and highest octaves are given; intervening notes are tuned chromatically.	
Cinco Cuatro	5 strings 4 courses	G_{3}•D_{4} D_{3}•F♯_{4}•B_{4}		North-western Venezuela		
Cinco Y Medio	5 strings 5 courses	Standard/common: E_{4}•G_{3}•D_{4}•F♯_{4}•B_{4} Alternates: "El Tocuyo tuning": A_{4}•D_{3}•F♯_{4}•B_{4}•E_{4}		North-western Venezuela		
Cinco y Medio	6 strings 6 courses	Standard/common: E_{3}•A_{3}•D_{3}•F♯_{4}•B_{4}•E_{4} Alternate: "El Tocuyo tuning": A_{4}•A_{3}•D_{3}•F♯_{4}•B_{4}•E_{4}		North-western Venezuela	Standard a.k.a. "Sanara tuning"	
Cinco Seis		( See Seis Cinco )				( See Seis Cinco )
Cittern (long scale)	10 strings 5 courses	Standard/common (aka "Irish"): D_{2} D_{2}•G_{2} G_{2}•D_{3} D_{3}•A_{3} A_{3}•D_{4} D_{4} Alternates: Low 'C'; C_{2} C_{2}•G_{2} G_{2}•D_{3} D_{3}•A_{3} A_{3}•D_{4} D_{4}: Mandolin(all fifths): C_{2} C_{2}•G_{2} G_{2}•D_{3} D_{3}•A_{3} A_{3}•E_{4} E_{4}	Celtic or Flatback Cittern	Europe	Long Scale ~ 25.25" (64.1 cm) Many other modal tunings have been described for citterns.	
Cittern (mid scale)	10 strings 5 courses	Standard/common: D_{2} D_{2}•G_{2} G_{2}•D_{3} D_{3}•A_{3} A_{3}•E_{4} E_{4} Alternates: Irish: D_{2} D_{2}•G_{2} G_{2}•D_{3} D_{3}•A_{3} A_{3}•D_{4} D_{4}: Modal D: D_{2} D_{2}•A_{2} A_{2}•D_{3} D_{3}•A_{3} A_{3}•D_{4} D_{4}	Celtic or Flatback Cittern	Europe	Mid Scale ~ 22.5" (57.2 cm) Many other modal tunings have been described for citterns.	
Cittern (short scale)	10 strings 5 courses	Standard/common: G_{2} G_{2}•D_{3} D_{3}•A_{3} A_{3}•D_{4} D_{4}•A_{4} A_{4} Alternates: Modal G: G_{2} G_{2}•D_{3} D_{3}•G_{3} G_{3}•D_{4} D_{4}•G_{4} G_{4}: Mandolin High 'B': G_{2} G_{2}•D_{3} D_{3}•A_{3} A_{3}•E_{4} E_{4}•B_{4} B_{4}	Celtic or Flatback Cittern	Europe	Short Scale ~ 20.0" (51.0 cm) Many other modal tunings have been described for citterns.	
Crwth	5 strings 5 courses	G_{2}•C_{3}•C_{2}•D_{2}•D_{3}	Crowd, Rote	Wales	Traditional Welsh tuning	
Cuatro Alto	10 strings 5 courses	F♯_{4} F♯_{3}•B_{3} B_{4}•E_{4} E_{4}•A_{4} A_{4}•D_{5} D_{5}	Alto Cuatro	Puerto Rico	Rare.	
Cuatro Antiguo	8 strings 4 courses	A_{3} A_{3}•E_{4} E_{4}•A_{4} A_{4}•D_{5} D_{5}		Puerto Rico	A 4 string/4 course version exists, tuned the same	
Cuatro Bajo	10 strings 5 courses	E_{3} E_{2}•A_{3} A_{2}•D_{3} D_{3}•G_{3} G_{3}•C_{4} C_{4}	Bass Cuatro	Puerto Rico	Rare.	
Cuatro Cubano	8 strings 4 courses	Standard/common: G_{4} G_{3}•C_{4} C_{4}•E_{4} E_{4}•A_{4} A_{4} Alternates: G_{4} G_{3}•C_{4} C_{4}•E_{4} E_{4}•G_{4} G_{4}; A_{4} A_{3}•D_{4} D_{4}•F♯_{4} F♯_{4}•B_{4} B_{4}	Cuban Cuatro, Tres-Cuatro	Cuba		
Cuatro, Puerto Rican	10 strings 5 courses	B_{3} B_{2}•E_{4} E_{3}•A_{3} A_{3}•D_{4} D_{4}•G_{4} G_{4}	Cuatro Tradicional, Cuatro Tenor, Cuatro Puertorriqueno, Cuatro Aviolinado, Cuatro Moderno, tenor Cuatro	Puerto Rico	The Tenor Cuatro is the standard instrument of the Puerto Rican Cuatro Family. Cuatro Aviolinado means 'violin-shaped cuatro'; Cuatro Moderno is to distinguish from the Cuatro Antiguo	
Cuatro, Venezuelan	4 strings 4 courses	A_{3}•D_{4}•F♯_{4}•B_{3}	Cuatro Venezolano	Venezuela	Standard aka "D_{6} tuning"	
Cuatro Soprano	10 strings 5 courses	C♯_{5} C♯_{4}•F♯_{4} F♯_{5}•B_{4} B_{4}•E_{5} E_{5}•A_{5} A_{5}	Soprano Cuatro	Puerto Rico	Rare.	
Cuk	3 strings 3 courses	G_{4} • B_{3} • E_{3}	Kroncong Cuk, Nylon kroncong guitar	Indonesia		
Cümbüş	12 strings 6 courses	Standard/common: A_{2} A_{2}•B_{2} B_{2}•E_{3} E_{3}•A_{3} A_{3}•D_{4} D_{4}•G_{4} G_{4} Alternates: Alternative Standard: D_{2} D_{2}•E_{2} E_{2}•A_{2} A_{2}•D_{3} D_{3}•G_{3} G_{3}•C_{4} C_{4}; Egypt/Arab: D_{2} D_{2}•G_{2} G_{2}•A_{2} A_{2}•D_{3} D_{3}•G_{3} G_{3}•C_{4} C_{4}; Turkish/Armenian: E_{2} E_{2}•A_{2} A_{2}•B_{2} B_{2}•E_{3} E_{3}•A_{3} A_{3}•D_{4} D_{4}		Turkey	Tunings are highly variable, other common alternates include: Turkish Armenian alt.: C♯_{2} C♯_{2}•F♯_{2} F♯_{2}•B_{2} B_{2}•E_{3} E_{3}•A_{3} A_{3}•D_{4} D_{4}; New Turkish classical: F♯_{2} F♯_{2}•B_{2} B_{2}•E_{3} E_{3}•A_{3} A_{3}•D_{4} D_{4}•G_{4} G_{4}; Old Turkish classical: A_{2} A_{2}•D_{3} D_{3}•E_{3} E_{3}•A_{3} A_{3}•D_{4} D_{4}•G_{4} G_{4}	
Cümbüş, tambur	6 strings 3 courses	D_{2} D_{2}•A_{2} A_{2}•D_{3} D_{3}		Turkey		
Cura	6 strings 3 courses	D_{4} D_{4}•A_{4} A_{4}•E_{5} E_{5}	Cura saz	Turkey		
Cura	7 strings 3 courses	G_{3} G_{3}•D_{4} D_{4}•A_{4} A_{4} A_{4}	Cura saz	Turkey		
Cura	8 strings 4 courses	G_{3} G_{3}•D_{4} D_{4}•A_{4} A_{4}•E_{5} E_{5}	Cura saz	Turkey	Same as Mandolin	

== D ==
Instrument	Strings & Courses	Tuning(s)	Alternative Names	Origin	Notes	Picture
Đàn bầu	1 string/ 1 course	C_{3} [*]	Đàn độc huyền, Độc huyền cầm	Vietnam	* Tuning is approximate, and frequently varies	
Đàn đáy	3 strings 3 courses	G_{3}•C_{4}•F_{4}	Vo de cam, Đàn đáy	Vietnam		
Đàn nguyệt	2 strings 2 courses	[ * ]	Nguyệt cầm, Đàn kìm	Vietnam	* There is no fixed tuning: one string is tuned to a convenient vocal pitch, the other is tuned a 4th, a 5th or (rarely) an octave above that.	
Đàn nhị	2 strings 2 courses	Standard/common: F C Alternates: cheo: C G; hoy bac: G D	Đàn cò	Vietnam		
Đàn tranh	17 strings, 17 courses[*]	G_{3} A_{3} C_{4} D_{4} E_{4} G_{4} A_{4} C_{5} D_{5} E_{5} G_{5} A_{5} C_{6} D_{6} E_{6} G_{7} A_{7}		Vietnam	*Instruments with from 14–25 strings/courses have been made; 17 is considered the current standard (2014)	
Daruan	4 strings 4 courses	D_{2} A_{2} D_{3} A_{3}'	Bass Ruan	China	lit. "large Ruan"	
Dihu	2 strings 2 courses	G_{2} D_{3}; D_{3} A_{3}	Dadihu, Dahu, Ziaodihu, Zhongdihu	China	A larger version of the Erhu. Either tuning may be considered standard.	
Diyinruan	4 strings 4 courses	G_{1} D_{2} G_{2} D_{3}'	Contraass Ruan	China	lit. "low pitched Ruan"	
Dombra	2 strings 2 courses	Standard: D_{4}•G_{4}	Dambura, Dumbyra, Tumpyra, Tumra, Danbura	North central Asia		
Domra, alto	3 strings 3 courses	E_{3}•A_{3}•D_{4}		Russia		
Domra, alto	4 strings 4 courses	C_{3}•G_{3}•D_{4}•A_{4}		Ukraine	Same as mandola tuning	
Domra, bass	3 strings 3 courses	E_{2}•A_{2}•D_{3}		Russia		
Domra, bass	4 strings 4 courses	C_{2}•G_{2}•D_{3}•A_{3}		Ukraine	Same as mandocello tuning	
Domra, contrabass	3 strings 3 courses	Standard: E_{1}•A_{1}•D_{2} Alternate: A_{1}•D_{2}•G_{2}		Russia		
Domra, contrabass	4 strings 4 courses	E_{1}•A_{1}•D_{2}•G_{2}		Ukraine	Same as the orchestral double bass	
Domra, Mezzo-soprano	3 strings 3 courses	B_{3}•E_{4}•A_{4}		Russia	Rare	
Domra, piccolo	3 strings 3 courses	B_{4}•E_{5}•A_{5}		Russia		
Domra, piccolo	4 strings 4 courses	C_{4}•G_{4}•D_{5}•A_{5}		Ukraine	Octave higher than the mandola	
Domra, prima	3 strings 3 courses	E_{4}•A_{4}•D_{5}		Russia	The main instrument of the domra family	
Domra, prima	4 strings 4 courses	G_{3}•D_{4}•A_{4}•E_{5}		Ukraine	Same as mandolin tuning	
Domra, tenor	3 strings 3 courses	B_{2}•E_{3}•A_{3}		Russia		
Domra, tenor	4 strings 4 courses	G_{2}•D_{3}•A_{3}•E_{4}		Ukraine	Same as octave-mandolin tuning	
Dotara	4 strings 4 courses	F♯_{3}•C♯_{3}•F♯_{4}•B_{4}		India		
Dotara	6 strings 5 courses	G_{2} G_{3}•C_{4}•G_{4}•G_{4}•C_{5}		Bangladesh		
Double bass	4 strings 4 courses	Standard/common: E_{1}•A_{1}•D_{2}•G_{2} Alternates: Drop D: D_{1}•A_{1}•D_{2}•G_{2}; Solo Tuning: F♯_{1}•B_{1}•E_{2}•A_{2}; With low 'C' machine: C_{1}•A_{1}•D_{2}•G_{2}: 'C' Machine "Legion": B_{0}•A_{1}•D_{2}•G_{2}	Bass, bass fiddle, contrabass, string bass, standup bass, doghouse	Europe	Standard aka "orchestral tuning"	
Double bass, 5-string	5 strings 5 courses	Standard/common: C_{1}•E_{1}•A_{1}•D_{2}•G_{2} Alternates: Modern 4th tuning: B_{0}•E_{1}•A_{1}•D_{2}•G_{2}	Bass, bass fiddle, contrabass, string bass, standup bass, doghouse	Europe	Standard aka "orchestral tuning"	
Dranyen	7 strings 3 courses	A_{3} A_{3}•D_{4} D_{3} D_{3}•G_{3} G_{3}	Dramyin, Dramnyen	Bhutan and Tibet	Standard aka "Bhutanese tuning"	
Dranyen	6 strings 3 courses	A_{3} A_{3}•D_{3} D_{3}•G_{3} G_{3}	Dramyin, Dramnyen	Bhutan and Tibet	Standard aka "Tibetan tuning"	
Dulcimer, 3 course	3–6 strings 3 courses	Standard/common: 3-string: A_{3}•A_{3}•D_{3}; 4-string: A_{3} A_{3}•A_{3}•D_{3}; 5-string: A_{3} A_{3}•A_{3}•D_{3} D_{3}; 6-string: A_{3} A_{3}•A_{3} A_{3}•D_{3} D_{3}; Alternates (see notes): Mixolydian: D_{4}•A_{3}•D_{3}; Dorian: G_{3}•A_{3}•D_{3}; Aeolian: C_{4}•A_{3}•D_{3}; Galax ("Unison"): D_{4}•D_{4}•D_{3}	Mountain Dulcimer, Appalachian Dulcimer, Lap Dulcimer, Dulcimore, Delcimore, Delcimer	US	Most dulcimers are either 3 or 4 course; any or all courses may be doubled with a second, unison string—hence the number of different stringing possibilities.; Alternates listed here give a pitch for each whole course, regardless of number of strings.; Many variants are used; there is no fixed "standard" for the four-course.; Chromatic instruments exist, but traditionally dulcimers are fretted in diatonic intervals: whole (step), whole, half, whole, whole, whole, half.	3-course, 4-string dulcimer:
Dulcimer, 4 course	4–8 strings 4 courses	Common*: 4-string: D_{4}•D_{4}•A_{3}•D_{3}; 5-string: D_{4} D_{4}•D_{4}•A_{3}•D_{3}; 6-string: D_{4} D_{4}•D_{4}•A_{3}•D_{3} D_{3}; 8-string: D_{4} D_{4}•D_{4} D_{4}•A_{3} A_{3}•D_{3} D_{3}; Alternates (see notes): G-tuning: D_{4}•B_{3}•G_{3}•D_{3}; Dorian: D_{4}•C_{4}•G_{3}•D_{3}; Ragtime: D_{4}•A♯_{3}•A_{3}•D_{3}; D-tuning: F♯_{4}•D_{4}•A_{3}•D_{3}	Mountain Dulcimer, Appalachian Dulcimer, Lap Dulcimer, Dulcimore, Delcimore, Delcimer	US	Most dulcimers are either 3 or 4 course; any or all courses may be doubled with a second, unison string—hence the number of different stringing possibilities.; Alternates listed here give a pitch for each whole course, regardless of number of strings.; Many variants are used; there is no fixed "standard" for the four-course.; Chromatic instruments exist, but traditionally dulcimers are fretted in diatonic intervals: whole (step), whole, half, whole, whole, whole, half.	3-course, 4-string dulcimer:
Dutar	2 strings 2 courses	Standard/common: D_{3}•G_{3} Alternate: D_{3}•A_{3}	Dotar	Uzbekistan	This instrument is found in many forms throughout central Asia.	

== E ==
Instrument	Strings & Courses	Tuning(s)	Alternative Names	Origin	Notes	Picture
Ektara	1 string 1 course	No standard; string is tuned to any convenient pitch.	Ektar, Iktar, Gopichand, Gobijeu	India		
Epinette des Vosges	6 strings [*] 6 courses	Common: G C G		France	Typically three fretted strings; three drones, but the number of drones may vary widely. Similar in concept to the Apalacian Dulcimer	
Erhu	2 strings 2 courses	D_{4} A_{4}	Nanhu	China		

== F ==
Instrument	Strings & Courses	Tuning(s)	Alternative Names	Origin	Notes	Picture
Fegereng	2 strings 2 courses	[*]	Faglong, Fuglung, Hegelong, Kutyapi, Kutiapi, Kotyapi, Kotapi, Kudyapi, Kuglong, Kadlong, Kudlong, Kudlung, Kusyapi	Southeast Asia	[*] There is no "standard" tuning. One string is tuned to any convenient pitch, and the other is tuned one octave higher.	
Fiddle	4 strings 4 courses	Standard/common: G_{3} D_{4} A_{4} E_{5} Alternates: Cajun: F_{3} C_{4} G_{4} D_{5}; Open G: G_{3} D_{4} G_{4} B_{4}; Sawmill: G_{3} D_{4} G_{4} D_{5}; Gee-dad: G_{3} D_{4} A_{4} D_{5}; Open D: D_{3} D_{4} A_{4} D_{5}; High bass: A_{3} D_{4} A_{4} E_{5}; Cross tuning: A_{3} E_{4} A_{4} E_{5}; Calico: A_{3} E_{4} A_{4} C♯_{5}	Violin, Kit, Pochette	Europe, USA	"Fiddle" describes a playing style more than a unique instrument; a fiddle is just a violin with a slightly different "set-up". Standard aka "Italian" or "orchestral" tuning, High Bass aka "Old-time D tuning", Cross tuning aka "High counter", Calico aka "Black Mountain Rag" or the Swedish tunings: Trollstämning, or Näckastämning	

== G ==
Instrument	Strings & Courses	Tuning(s)	Alternative Names	Origin	Notes	Picture
Gabusi	6 strings 4 courses	D g bb dd	Gaboussi	Comoros Islands		
Gadulka	3 strings 3 courses	A_{3} E_{3} A_{4}		The Balkans	3 playing strings, with up to 10 sympathetic strings.	
Gambus Hadhramaut	11 strings 6 courses	C • G G • B B • A A • E E • D D		Malaysia, Indonesia	Related to oud	Musician playing gambus Hadhramaut.
Gaoyinruan	4 strings 4 courses	G_{3} D_{4} G_{4} D_{5}	Soprano Ruan	China	Literally "high pitched Ruan"	
Gehu	4 strings 4 courses	C_{2} G_{2} D_{3} A_{3}	Erhu-cello,	China	Same tunings as cello	
Gekkin	4 strings 2 courses	C_{3} C_{3} G_{3} G_{3} [*]	Gekin	Japan	* Tuning is not western equal temperament	
Gekkin	4 strings 4 courses	A_{3} D_{4} D_{4} D_{5}	Japanese Yueqin	Japan		
Geyerleier	8 strings 4 courses	Standard/common: E_{3} E_{2}•B_{3} B_{2}•E_{3} E_{3}•B_{3} B_{3} Alternate: D_{3} D_{2}•A_{3} A_{2}•D_{3} D_{3}•A_{3} A_{3}		Hamburg, Germany		
Guitalele	6 strings 6 courses	Standard/common: A_{2} D_{3} G_{3} C_{4} E_{4} A_{4} Alternate: B_{2} E_{3} A_{3} D_{4} F♯_{4} B_{4}	Ukutar	US, Japan	Tuned a 4th or a 5th higher than the standard guitar.	
Guitar	6 strings 6 courses	Standard: E_{2} A_{2} D_{3} G_{3} B_{3} E_{4} Common Alternates: Drop D: D_{2} A_{2} D_{3} G_{3} B_{3} E_{4}; Open D: D_{2} A_{2} D_{3} F♯_{3} A_{3} D_{4}; Open G: D_{2} G_{2} D_{3} G_{3} B_{3} D_{4}; Open A: E_{2} A_{2} E_{3} A_{3} C♯_{4} E_{4}; Lute: E_{2} A_{2} D_{3} F♯_{3} B_{3} E_{4}; Irish: D_{2} A_{2} D_{3} G_{3} A_{3} D_{4}; Nashville: E_{3} A_{3} D_{4} G_{4} B_{3} E_{4}	Classical guitar, 6-string guitar, Spanish guitar, Steel-string guitar	Spain (acoustic) USA (electric)	"classical" = guitar with gut, nylon, or other synthetic strings; "acoustic"/"steel-string" = guitar with metal strings; Open G aka "bottleneck," "taro patch"; Open A aka "Spanish"; "Lute tuning" is usually capoed on 3rd fret to give G_{2} C_{3} F_{3} A_{3} D_{4} G_{4}, and E_{2} is often dropped to D_{2} (F_{2} with capo). There are hundreds of alternate guitar tunings; whole books have been written on the subject.	Classical Guitar: Steel String Guitar: Electric Guitar:
Guitar, alto	11 strings 11 courses	B♭_{1} C_{2} D_{2} E♭_{2} F_{2} G_{2} C_{3} F_{3} B♭_{3} D_{4} G_{4}	Archguitar, altgitarren, Bolin guitar	Sweden		
Guitar, alto	13 strings 13 courses	A_{1} B♭_{1} C_{2} D_{2} E_{2} F_{2} G_{2} A_{2} D_{3} F_{3} A_{3} D_{4} F_{4}	Archguitar, altgitarren, Bolin guitar	Sweden	This instrument is very rare.	
Guitar, alto (Niibori)	6 strings 6 courses	Standard/common: B_{2} E_{3} A_{3} D_{4} F♯_{4} B_{4}	G Guitar	Japan	Transposing guitar in the key of G, developed for the Niibori Guitar Orchestra	
Guitar, 7 string	7 strings 7 courses	Standard/common: B_{1} E_{2} A_{2} D_{3} G_{3} B_{3} E_{4} Alternate: Van Eps: A_{1} E_{2} A_{2} D_{3} G_{3} B_{3} E_{4}; Choro: C_{2} E_{2} A_{2} D_{3} G_{3} B_{3} E_{4}	7 string classical guitar, "Brazilian" guitar, 7 string electric guitar	US	Van Eps aka "Jazz tuning" "Choro" is popular in Brazil 6-string alternates may be adapted for the 7-string	
Guitar, 8 string (low/high)	8 strings 8 courses	B_{1} E_{2} A_{2} D_{3} G_{3} B_{3} E_{4} A_{4}	8 string classical guitar	Spain	aka "Galbraith tuning"	
Guitar, 8 string (added basses)	8 strings 8 courses	[B_{1} D_{2}] E_{2} A_{2} D_{3} G_{3} B_{3} E_{4}	8 string classical guitar 8 string electric guitar	Spain	Tuning of two lowest strings varies with player and music	
Guitar, 9 string	9 strings 6 courses	E_{3} E_{2}•A_{3} A_{2}•D_{4} D_{3}•G_{3} B_{3} E_{4}		US	12-string guitar variant with doubled bases	
Guitar, 9 string	9 strings 6 courses	E_{2}• A_{2}• D_{3}• G_{4} G_{3}•B_{3} B_{3}•E_{4} E_{4}		US	12-string guitar variant with doubled trebles	
Guitar, 9 string	9 strings 9 courses	F♯_{1} B_{1} E_{2} A_{2} D_{3} G_{3} B_{3} E_{4} A_{4} [*]		US	* These short-scale, extended range instruments are uncommon, and tuning hasn't really been standardized for them.	
Guitar, 10 string	10 strings 10 courses	F♯_{2} G♯_{2} A♯_{2} C_{2} E_{2} A_{2} D_{3} G_{3} B_{3} E_{4}	10 String classical guitar	Spain	Standard tuning, developed by luthier José Ramírez III in collaboration with guitarist Narciso Yepes	
Twelve-string guitar, 12 string	12 strings 6 courses	Standard/common: E_{3} E_{2}•A_{3} A_{2}•D_{4} D_{3}•G_{4} G_{3}•B_{3} B_{3}•E_{4} E_{4} Alternates: Variant: E_{4} E_{2}•A_{3} A_{2}•D_{4} D_{3}•G_{4} G_{3}•B_{3} B_{3}•E_{4} E_{4}; All 6-string alternates may be adapted to 12-string.	Twelve-stringed Guitar	US?	Some players tune the third course to unison G_{3}'s to minimize breakage of the high G string.	
Guitar, baritone	6 strings 6 courses	Common tunings: 4th lower: B_{1} E_{2} A_{2} D_{3} F♯_{3} B_{3}; 5th lower: A_{1} D_{2} G_{2} C_{3} E_{3} A_{3}; Octave lower: E_{1} A_{1} D_{2} G_{2} B_{2} E_{3}		US	There really is no "standard" tuning for baritone guitar; choice of tuning depends on instrument, stringing, and player's preferences.	
Guitar, bass	4 strings 4 courses	Standard/common: E_{1} A_{1} D_{2} G_{2} Alternates: D_{1} A_{1} D_{2} G_{2}; D_{1} G_{1} C_{2} F_{2}	Bass, electric bass, 4-string bass, Fender bass	USA	First U.S. patent filed by Leo Fender on November 21, 1952.	Electric Bass: Acoustic Bass:
Guitar, bass (5-string)	5 strings 5 courses	Standard/common: B_{0} E_{1} A_{1} D_{2} G_{2}; E_{1} A_{1} D_{2} G_{2} C_{3}	Bass, electric bass, 5-string bass		Essentially a 4-string bass with one added high or low string. Choice of tuning depends whether the added string is low or high.	
Guitar, bass (6-string)	6 strings 6 courses	Standard/common: B_{0} E_{1} A_{1} D_{2} G_{2} C_{3} Alternate: E_{1} A_{1} D_{2} G_{2} B_{2} E_{3}	Bass, electric bass, 6-string bass, contrabass guitar		Essentially a 4-string bass with either added high and low strings.	
Guitar, bass (8-string)	8 strings 4 courses	E_{2} E_{1}•A_{2} A_{1}•D_{3} D_{2}•G_{3} G_{2}	Eight-string bass guitar, 8-string bass	US	Essentially a 4-string bass with each string doubled at the upper octave.	
Guitar, bass (12-string)	12 strings 4 courses	E_{2} E_{2} E_{1}•A_{2} A_{2} A_{1}•D_{3} D_{3} D_{2}•G_{3} G_{3} G_{2}	Twelve-string bass guitar, 12-string bass	US	Similar to an 8-string bass with doubled upper octaves.	
Guitar, octave	6 strings 6 courses	E_{3}•A_{3}•D_{4}•G_{4}•B_{4}•E_{5}	Piccolo Guitar, Soprano Guitar	Germany	One octave higher than the standard guitar.	
Guitarra De Golpe	5 strings 5 courses	Standard/common: D_{3}•G_{3}•C_{4}•E_{3}•A_{3} Alternates: Tecalitan: D_{3}•G_{3}•B_{4}•E_{3}•A_{3}; Urbana: G_{3}•C_{4}•E_{4}•A_{3}•D_{4}; Urbana alt.: G_{3}•C_{4}•E_{3}•A_{3}•D_{4}	Guitarra Colorada, Quinta De Golpe, Mariachera	Mexico	Note re-entrant tunings	
Lute guitar	6 strings 6 courses	Standard/common: E_{2}•A_{2}•D_{3}•G_{3}•B_{3}•E_{4} Alternates are the same as the guitar	Guitarren laute, guitar-lute, lute-guitar	Germany	Basically this is a lute-shaped guitar; a guitar neck on a lute body.	
Guitarro	6 strings 6 courses	B_{4} F♯_{4} D_{5} A_{5} E_{5}	Guitarrico, Spanish Tiple	Spain		
Guitarrón	6 strings 6 courses	A_{1} D_{2} G_{2} C_{3} E_{3} A_{2}	Guitarrón de Toloche	Mexico		
Guitarron Argentino	6 strings 6courses	B_{1} E_{2} A_{2} D_{3} G_{3} B_{3}		Argentina	A 6-string acoustic bass guitar.	
Guitarrón chileno	24 or 25 strings total 5 courses + 4 open "diablitos"	diablitos, top: F♯_{5} A_{4} (D_{4}) D_{4} D_{3} D_{3} D_{2} • (G_{4}) G_{4} G_{4} G_{4} G_{3} G_{3} • (C_{4}) C_{4} C_{4} C_{3} C_{2} • E_{4} E_{4} E_{4} • A_{4} A_{4} A_{4} diablitos, bottom: G_{4} B_{4}		Chile	4 short, unfretted strings are known as diablitos (little devils). Number of strings in 3rd, 4th, & 5th courses may vary.	
Guitar, tenor	4 strings 4 courses	Standard C_{3} • G_{3} • D_{4} • A_{4} Common Alternates: G_{2} D_{3} A_{3} E_{4}; G_{2} D_{3} A_{3} D_{4}		US	Same tuning as tenor banjo, mandola.	
Guitar, terz	6 strings 6 courses	G_{2} C_{3} F_{3} B♭_{3} D_{4} G_{4}	Tertz Guitar, Tierce Guitar, Third Guitar	Italy, Germany	A minor third higher than standard guitar tuning.	
Guqin	7 strings 7 courses	sol la do re mi sol la		China	Guqin music uses no absolute pitch so tuning varies. The common Zheng Diao tuning sets "do" to approx. "F_{3}" and tunes other strings relative to that to give C_{3} D_{3} F_{3} G_{3} A_{3} C_{4} D_{4}	
Gusli	9 strings 9 courses	Standard/common: E_{3} A_{3} B_{3} C_{4} D_{4} E_{4} F_{4} G_{4} A_{4}	Krylovidnye gusli	Russia	Tuning varies; this is a common traditional tuning	

== H ==
Instrument	Strings & Courses	Tuning(s)	Alternative Names	Origin	Notes	Picture
Halszither	9 strings 5 courses	G_{2} • D_{3} D_{3} • G_{3} G_{3} • B_{3} B_{3} • D_{4} D_{4}	Krienser Halszither	Switzerland		
Hardingfele	4 strings 4 courses plus 4–5 resonating strings	Standard/common: A_{3} D_{4} A_{4} E_{5} res. strings: (B_{3}) D_{4} E_{4} F♯_{4} A_{4} Common alternates: Kolagutstille: A_{3} C_{4} A_{4} E_{5}; res.: (A_{3}) D_{4} E_{4} G_{4} A_{4}: Seljekvatstille: A_{3} D_{4} F♯_{4} E_{5}; res.: (B_{3}) D_{4} E_{4} F♯_{4} A_{4}: Trollstilt: A_{3} E_{4} A_{4} C♯_{5}; res.: (A_{3}) C♯_{4} E_{4} F♯_{4} A_{4}: Forstemt: A_{3} E_{4} A_{4} E_{5}; res.: (A_{3}) C♯_{4} E_{4} F♯_{4} A_{4}: Gorrlaus: F_{3} D_{4} A_{4} E_{5}; res.: (F_{3}) B_{3} D_{4} G_{4} A_{4}: Bas: G_{3} D_{4} A_{4} E_{5}; res.: (B_{3}) D_{4} E_{4} G_{4} A_{4}	Hardanger violin, Hardanger fiddle	Norway	Standard aka "Oppstilt bas" : More than 80% of music written for this instrument uses this tuning.; Trollstilt aka; "Devil's Tuning": Bas aka "Violin tuning"; There are many other variant tunings, most of them uncommon.	
Harp, Concert	47 strings 47 courses	C♭_{1} D♭_{1} E♭_{1} F♭_{1} G♭_{1} A♭_{1} B♭_{1} [ . . . ] * C♭_{7} D♭_{7} E♭_{7} F♭_{7} G♭_{7}	Pedal Harp, Double-action Harp, Diatonic Double-action Harp	France	* Only lowest and highest octaves shown. Tuning proceeds through 6 1/2 octaves using the C♭ diatonic scale	
Harp, Celtic	34 strings 34 courses[*]	C_{2} D_{2} E_{2} F_{2} G_{2} A_{2} B_{2} [ . . . ] * C_{6} D_{6} E_{6} F_{6} G_{6} A_{6}	Clàrsach, Folk Harp, Lever Harp	British Isles	* Number of strings varies, generally between 19 and 40; 34 strings is typical. Not all models have levers. Only lowest and highest octaves shown. Tuning proceeds through 4 1/2 octaves using the C diatonic scale.	
Harpsichord	Varies[*]	[*]Typical: C_{2} C♯_{2} D_{2} D♯_{2} E_{2} F_{2} F♯_{2} G_{2} G♯_{2} A_{2} A♯_{2} B_{2} [...] * C♯_{6} D_{6} D♯_{6} E_{6} F_{6} F♯_{6} G_{6} G♯_{6} A_{6} A♯_{6} B_{6} C_{7}	Virginal, Spinet, Clavicytherium, Ottavino, Pedal Harpsichord, et al	Europe (Belgium?)	Many variants exist having differing number of keys, multiple keyboards, pedal boards, choirs of strings, etc., and they may have anywhere from about 120 to many hundreds of strings. Tuning is given for a typical single-keyboard, 5-octave instrument, for the main choir of strings. Only lowest and highest octaves are shown; intervening notes are tuned chromatically. Often tuning is in some musical temperament other than 12-tone equal temperament (common on modern pianos).	
Harzither	8 strings 4 courses	GG • CC • EE • GG	Bergzither	Germany		
Huapanguera	8 strings 5 courses	G_{2} •D_{3} D_{4}•G_{3} G_{3}•B_{3} B_{3}•E_{3}		Mexico		
Huobosi	4 strings 4 courses	E_{2} A_{2} D_{3} G_{3}	Hubo, Sugudu	China		
Hurdy Gurdy	5 or 6 strings 5 courses	Traditional: (G_{4})G_{4} C_{4} G_{3} C_{3} C_{2} Alternates: Altered Traditional: (G_{4})G_{4} C_{4} G_{3} C_{3} G_{2}: Bourbonnais: (D_{5})D_{4} D_{4} G_{3} D_{3} D_{2}: Altered Bourbonnais: (D_{5})D_{4} D_{4} A_{3} D_{3} G_{2}: Vendée: (A_{5})A_{5} D_{4} A_{3} D_{3} D_{2}	Beggar's lyre, Crank lyre, Cymphan, Forgolant, Organistrum, Symphonia, Wheel fiddle, Wheel vielle	France	Stringing is given in reverse order, owing to the orientation of the instrument while playing. The first one (or two) strings are melody strings; others are drone strings. Other regional tuning variants exist.	

== I ==
Instrument	Strings & Courses	Tuning(s)	Alternative Names	Origin	Notes	Picture
Ichigenkin	1 string 1 course	no standard [*]		Japan	[*] string is tuned to any note convenient for the vocalist	
Igil	2 strings 2 courses	(E • B)	Ikili	Tuva, Mongolia	Pitch varies depending what other instruments the Igil is playing with, but the two strings are always tuned a 5th apart.	
Irish bouzouki	8 strings 4 courses	Standard/common: G_{3} G_{2}•D_{4} D_{3}•A_{3} A_{3}•E_{4} E_{4} Alternates: Mandolin: G_{2} G_{2}•D_{3} D_{3}•A_{3} A_{3}•E_{4} E_{4}: Irish: G_{3} G_{2}•D_{4} D_{3}•A_{3} A_{3}•D_{4} D_{4}: Modal D: A_{3} A_{2}•D_{4} D_{3}•A_{3} A_{3}•D_{4} D_{4}	Bouzouki, Octave Mandolin, tenor Mandolin (US), tenor Mandola (UK), Zouk	Ireland	Irish bouzouki is an octave mandolin with the two lowest courses tuned in octaves instead of unisons. "Modal D" octaves can also be tuned in unisons.	

== J ==
Instrument	Strings & Courses	Tuning(s)	Alternative Names	Origin	Notes	Picture
Jarana huasteca	5 strings 5 courses	G_{3} • B_{3} • D_{4} • F♯_{4} • A_{4}		Mexico		
Jarana jarocha	8 strings 5 courses	Modern or "Commercial"; A_{3} • D_{4} D_{4} • G_{3} G_{4} • B_{3} B_{3} • E_{4}: Traditional; G_{3}•C_{4} C_{4}•E_{3} E_{3}•A_{3} A_{3}•G_{4}		Mexico	Part of their name usually describes their size, for example: Jarana Chaquiste, Jarana Primera, Jarana Segunda, Jarana Tercera, Jarana Tercerola Where octave doublings occur will often differ depending on the size of the instrument. The larger instruments commonly double the middle courses at the octave.	
Jarana jarocha requinto	4 strings 4 courses	Standard/common: G_{2}•A_{2}•D_{2}•G_{3} Alternates: C_{2}•D_{2}•G_{2}•C_{3}; C_{2}•D_{2}•G_{3}•C_{3}; A_{2}•D_{3}•G_{3}•C_{3}	Jarocha requinto, requinto jarocha, guitarra de son	Mexico		
Jarana leona	4 strings 4 courses	G_{2}•A_{2}•D_{3}•G_{3}		Mexico		
Jouhikko	3 strings 3 courses	D A E	Jouhikannel	Finland	Absolute pitch is not fixed on this instrument	

== K ==
Instrument	Strings & Courses	Tuning(s)	Alternative Names	Origin	Notes	Picture
Kabosy	6 strings 4 courses	G • G • B B • D D		Madagascar		
Kacapi	6 strings 3 courses	A♯• B •C♯ •F• F♯		Indonesia	Uses a gamelan pelog scale. Tuning is approximated to western notation.	
Kamancheh	4 strings 4 courses	D_{5}•A_{5}•D_{4}•A_{4}		Iran, Armenia, Azerbaijan, Uzbekistan, Turkmenistan		
Khonkhota	8 strings 5 courses [*]	G_{4} G_{3}•C_{4}•D_{4} D_{3}•A_{3}•D_{4} D_{4}	Qonqhota, Ponputu, Mokholos, Machus	South America	Strings/courses are usually 8/5 but 7/5, 9/5, 10/5 or 11/5 variations exist.	
Kithara Sarda	6 strings 6 courses	B_{2} E_{2} A_{2} D_{3} F_{3} B_{3}		Sardinia, Italy		
Kobza	8 strings 4 courses	Standard/common: GG • DD • GG • CC Alternate: DD • AA • DD • GG	Kobuz, Kobsa	Moldavia, Romania, Hungary		
Kokles	11 strings 11 courses	G_{3} A_{3} C_{3} D_{3} E_{3} F_{3} G_{4} A_{4} B_{4} C_{4} G_{3} A_{3} C_{3} D_{3} E_{3} F_{3} G_{4} A_{4} B♭4 C_{4}	Kokle, Kūkles, Kūkle	Latvia	Since the 1980s the most common tunings for 11-stringed kokles among kokles players.	
Komuz	3 strings 3 courses	A E A	Qomuz, Gopuz, Kopuz, Kopus	Kyrgyzstan		
Kora	21 strings 21 courses	Traditional tunings: Tomora Ba/Silaba: F_{2} C_{3} D_{3} E_{3} F_{3} G_{3} A_{3} B_{3} C_{4} D_{4} E_{4} F_{4} G_{4} A_{4} B_{4} C_{5} D_{5} E_{5} F_{5} G_{5} A_{5}; Tomora Mesengo: F_{2} C_{3} +D_{3} +E♭_{3} F_{3} G_{3} +A_{3} +B♭_{3} C_{4} +D_{4} +E♭_{4} F_{4} G_{4} +A_{4} +B♭_{4} C_{5} +D_{5} +E♭_{5} F_{5} G_{5} +A_{5}; Hardino: F_{2} C_{3} -D_{3} +E_{3} F_{3} G_{3} -A_{3} +B_{3} C_{4} -D_{4} +E_{4} F_{4} G_{4} -A_{4} +B_{4} C_{5} -D_{5} +E_{5} F_{5} G_{5} -A_{5}; Sauta: F♯_{2} C_{3} D_{3} E_{3} F♯_{3} G_{3} A_{3} B_{3} C_{4} D_{4} E_{4} F♯_{4} G_{4} A_{4} B_{4} C_{5} D_{5} E_{5} F♯_{5} G_{5} A_{5}		West Africa	Scales roughly correspond to Western major, minor, and lydian scales, but are not in equal temperament. Any of the scales may be considered "standard".	
Koto	13 strings 13 courses	Traditional tunings: Itsikotchu-chô: D_{4} D_{4} A_{3} B_{3} D_{4} E_{4} F♯_{4} A_{4} B_{4} D_{5} E_{5} F♯_{5} A_{5}: Oshiki-chô: E_{4} A_{3} B_{3} D_{4} E_{3} F♯_{3} A_{3} B_{3} C♯_{4} E_{4} F♯_{4} A_{4} B_{4}: Sui-chô: E_{4} A_{3} B_{3} C♯_{4} E_{3} F♯_{3} A_{3} B_{3} C♯_{4} E_{4} F♯_{4} A_{4} B_{4}: Hyô-jô: B_{3} E_{3} F♯_{3} A_{3} B_{3} C♯_{4}/D_{4} E_{4} F♯_{4} A_{4} B_{4} C♯_{5}/D_{5} E_{5} F♯_{5}: Taishiki-chô: B_{3} E_{3} F♯_{3} G♯_{3} B_{3} C♯_{4} E_{4} F♯_{4} G♯_{4} B_{4} C♯_{4} E_{4} F♯_{4}: Banskiki-chô: F♯_{3} B_{3} C♯_{3} E_{3} F♯_{3} G♯_{3}/A_{3} B_{3} C♯_{4} E_{4} F♯_{4} G♯_{4}/A_{4} B_{4} C♯_{5}: Sôjô: G_{3} G_{3} D_{3} E_{3} G_{3} A_{3} B_{3} D_{4} E_{4} G_{4} A_{4} B_{4} D_{5}	箏, 琴	Japan	Tuning depends on the piece being played.; A_{4} is closer to 430 Hz than to the western standard (440 Hz), and intervals are in just intonation and not equal temperament.; In some tunings alternate choices are available for strings 6 and 11 (indicated with a slash); whatever note is chosen these strings are always tuned one octave apart.	
Krachappi	4 strings 2 courses	F_{2} F_{2} • B_{2} B_{2}	Grajappi, Krachap pi	Thailand		
Kwitra	8 strings 4 courses	GG • EE • AA • DD	Kuitra, Kouitra, Quwaytara	Algeria		

== L ==
Instrument	Strings & Courses	Tuning(s)	Alternative Names	Origin	Notes	Picture
Laouto	8 strings 4 courses	Standard/common: C_{2} C_{3}•G_{2} G_{3}•D_{2} D_{3}•A_{3} A_{3} Alternate: Cretan: G_{2} G_{3}•D_{2} D_{3}•A_{2} A_{3}•E_{3} E_{3}	Laghouto	Greece	Standard a.k.a. "Mainland"	
Laúd	12 strings 6 courses	Standard/common: G♯_{2} G♯_{2}•C♯_{3} C♯_{3}•F♯_{3} F♯_{3}•B_{3} B_{3}•E_{4} E_{4}•A_{4} A_{4} Alternates: Cuban: D_{2} D_{2}•A_{2} A_{2}•E_{3} E_{3}•B_{3} B_{3}•F♯_{4} F♯_{4}•C♯_{5} C♯_{5}: Alt. Cuban: D_{2} D_{2}•A_{2} A_{2}•E_{3} E_{3}•B_{3} B_{3}•F♯_{4} F♯_{4}•D_{5} D_{5}	Spanish laud	Spain	Standard aka Spanish Tuning; one octave lower than the Spanish Bandurria	
Laúd, Cuban	12 strings 6 courses	D_{3} D_{3}•F♯_{3} F♯_{3}•B_{3} B_{3}•E_{4} E_{4}•A_{4} A_{4}•D_{5} D_{5}	Laud Cubano	Cuba		
Laúd, Philippine	14 strings 6 courses	F♯_{2}•B_{2} B_{2}•E_{3} E_{3}•A_{3} A_{3} A_{3}•D_{4} D_{4} D_{4}•G_{4} G_{4} G_{4}	Laud	Philippines	Same tuning as the Octavina	
Lili'u	6 strings 4 courses	G_{4} • C_{3} C_{4} • E_{4} • A_{3} A_{4}	6 string Tenor Ukulele	Hawaii	Invented by Sam Kamaka to celebrate the 50th anniversary of Hawaii's Statehood. The name comes from the last queen of Hawaii, Queen Liliʻuokalani	
Liuqin	4 strings 4 courses	G_{3} • D_{4} • G_{4} • D_{5} Alternate: G_{3} • D_{4} • A_{4} • E_{5}	Liuyeqin, willow leaf instrument	China		
Liuto cantabile	10 strings 5 courses	C_{2} C_{2}•G_{2} G_{2}•D_{3} D_{3}•A_{3} A_{3}•E_{4} E_{4}	Liuto moderno	Naples, Italy	Some courses are occasionally single-strung	
Luc huyen cam	5 strings 5 courses	Standard/common: C_{3} • F_{3} • C_{4} • G_{4} • C_{5} Alternate: Hu ai Cam: G_{2} • D_{3} • G_{3} • B_{4} • D_{5}; (a.k.a. "slide guitar tuning")	Đàn Ghita, Ghita, Phím Lõm, Vietnamese guitar	Vietnam	Originally a 4- or 5-string instrument; today often nearly identical to a 6-string western guitar, except for having a scalloped fingerboard and one less string. (See below.)	
Luc huyen cam	6 strings 6 courses	Standard/common: E_{2} • A_{2} • D_{3} • G_{3} • B_{3} • E_{4} Alternates: Day Rach-Gia: E_{2} • A_{2} • D_{3} • G_{3} • D_{4} • G_{4}; Day Lai: D_{2} • A_{2} • D_{3} • G_{3} • D_{4} • G_{4}; Day Sai Gon: D_{2} • G_{2} • D_{3} • G_{3} • D_{4} • G_{4}	Đàn Ghita, Ghita, Phím Lõm, Vietnamese guitar	Vietnam	"Standard" identical with the common western guitar.; Day Lai a.k.a. "aculturated tuning"; Day Sai Gon a.k.a. "Saigon Tuning"	
Lute	[ * ]	Medieval 12 string/6 course: G_{2} G_{2} • C_{3} C_{3} • F_{3} F_{3} • A_{3} A_{3} • D_{4} D_{4} • G_{4} G_{4}: Medieval 13 string/7 course: D_{2} D_{3}•G_{2} G_{3}•C_{3} C_{4}•F_{3} F_{3}•A_{3} A_{3}•D_{4} D_{4}•G_{4}: Renaissance 15 string/8 course; D_{2} D_{3}•F_{2} F_{3}•G_{2} G_{3}•C_{3} C_{4}•F_{3} F_{3}•A_{3} A_{3}•D_{4} D_{4}•G_{4}: Renaissance 19 string/10 course; C_{2} C_{3}•D_{2} D_{3}•E♭2 E♭3•F_{2} F_{3}•G_{2} G_{3}•C_{3} C_{4}•F_{3} F_{3}•A_{3} A_{3}•D_{4} D_{4}•G_{4}: Baroque 24 string/13 course; A_{1} A_{2}•B_{1} B_{2}•C_{2} C_{3}•D_{2} D_{3}•E_{2} E_{3}•F_{2} F_{3}•G_{2} G_{3}•A_{2} A_{2}•D_{3} D_{3}•F_{3} F_{3}•A_{3} A_{3}•D_{4}•F_{4}		Europe	[ * ] The number of strings and courses on a lute can vary widely depending on period and geographical region. Among the more common forms are 6, 7, 8, 10, and 13 courses. (Pictured: 8 course Renaissance Lute.)	
Cretan lyra	3 strings 3 courses	D_{3} • A_{3} • E_{4}		Crete, Greece		

== M ==
Instrument	Strings & Courses	Tuning(s)	Alternative Names	Origin	Notes	Picture
Mandobass	4 strings 4 courses	Standard/common: E_{1} A_{1} D_{2} G_{2} Alternate: G_{1} D_{2} A_{2} E_{3} Alternate: C_{1} G_{1} D_{2} A_{2}	Bass Mandolin	Europe	The alternate tuning (2 octaves below the mandolin) is usually applied to a smaller-scale instrument (see Mandobass). The alternate tuning (2 octaves below the mandola) is usually applied to a smaller-scale instrument (see Mandobass).	
Mandobass	8 strings 4 courses	Standard/common: G_{1} G_{1}•D_{2} D_{2}•A_{2} A_{2}•E_{3} E_{3} Alternate: "Mandola": C_{1} C_{1}•G_{1} G_{1}•D_{2} D_{2}•A_{2} A_{2}	Tremolo-bass	Europe	Relatively rare; larger than the standard mandobass. Standard tuning is 2 octaves below the mandolin. Alternate tuning is 2 octaves below the mandola.	
Mandocello	8 strings 4 courses	C_{2} C_{2}•G_{2} G_{2}•D_{3} D_{3}•A_{3} A_{3}	Mandolincello, mandoloncello		Standard tuning is 1 octave below the mandola.	
Mandola	8 strings 4 courses	C_{3} C_{3}•G_{3} G_{3}•D_{4} D_{4}•A_{4} A_{4}	Tenor mandola (Europe)		A 5th below mandolin tuning.	
Mandolin	8 strings 4 courses	G_{3} G_{3}•D_{4} D_{4}•A_{4} A_{4}•E_{5} E_{5} Alternates: "Get Up John Tuning": F♯_{3} A_{3}•D_{4} D_{4}•A_{4} A_{4}•A_{5} D_{5} All violin alternate tunings may be adapted for the mandolin			Standard instrument of the mandolin family.	
Mandolinetto	8 strings 4 courses	G_{3} G_{3}•D_{4} D_{4}•A_{4} A_{4}•E_{5} E_{5}		USA and Canada	A guitar-shaped mandolin, or mandolin neck on ukulele body.	
Mandolin, Octave	8 strings 4 courses	Standard/common: G_{2} G_{2}•D_{3} D_{3}•A_{3} A_{3}•E_{4} E_{4} Alternate: Irish Bouzouki: G_{2} G_{2}•D_{3} D_{3}•A_{3} A_{3}•D_{4} D_{4}	Tenor Mandolin, Irish Bouzouki, Octave mandola (Europe)		Pitched 1 octave below the mandolin.	
Mandolin, piccolo	8 strings 4 courses	C_{4} C_{4}•G_{4} G_{4}•D_{5} D_{5}•A_{5} A_{5}	Brilliant tone mandolin		Tuned a 4th above the mandolin; 1 octave above the mandola.	
Mandriola	12 strings 4 courses	G_{3} G_{3} G_{3}•D_{4} D_{4} D_{4}•A_{4} A_{4} A_{4}•E_{5} E_{5} E_{5}	Tricordia	Europe	Tricordia is also a similar instrument tuned differently; both instruments are known by both names. (see Trichordia)	
Manguerito	7 strings 5 courses	D_{4}•G_{4}•B_{4} B_{3}•E_{4}•B_{4} B_{4}		La Paz, Bolivia		
Mejorana	5 strings 5 courses	"Por veinticinco": D_{4}•A_{4}•A_{3}•B_{3}•E_{4}: "Por seis": D_{4}•G_{4}•G_{3}•B_{3}•E_{4}	Mejorana, Rumbo	Panama	Either tuning may be considered "standard."	

== N ==
Instrument	Strings & Courses	Tuning(s)	Alternative Names	Origin	Notes	Picture
Nevoud	11 strings 6 courses	C♯_{2}•F♯_{2} F♯_{2}•B_{2} B_{2}•E_{3} E_{3}•A_{3} A_{3}•D_{4} D_{4}	Nevud, New Oud	Turkey		
Nigenkin	2 strings 2 courses	No standard [*]	Yakumogoto	Japan	[*] Strings are tuned in unison, to any pitch convenient for vocalist.	
Nyckelharpa, standard	4 strings 4 courses + 12 resonating strings	C_{3} • G_{3} • C_{4} • A_{4} res.strings: G♯_{3} A_{3} B♭_{3} B_{3} C_{4} C♯_{4} D_{4} E♭_{4} E_{4} F_{4} F♯_{4} G_{4}	Key-harp, Chromatic Nyckelharpa	Sweden	Number of sympathetic strings may vary.	
Nyckelharpa, tenor	4 strings 4 courses + 12 resonating strings	G_{2} • D_{3} • G_{3} • E_{4} res.strings: G♯_{2} A_{2} B♭_{2} B_{2} C_{3} C♯_{3} D_{3} E♭_{3} E_{3} F_{3} F♯_{3} G_{3}		Sweden	This instrument is of very recent invention.	

== O ==
Instrument	Strings & Courses	Tuning(s)	Alternative Names	Origin	Notes	Picture
Octavina	14 strings 6 courses	F♯_{1}•B_{1} B_{1}•E_{2} E_{2}•A_{2} A_{2} A_{2}•D_{3} D_{3} D_{3}•G_{3} G_{3} G_{3}	Philippine Laúd	Philippines	One octave lower than the Philippine Bandurria	
Octobass	3 strings 3 courses	Berlioz/Musée de la Musique: C_{1} G_{1} C_{2}: Musical Instrument Museum: C_{0} G_{0} D_{1}; Montreal Symphony Orchestra: A_{0} E_{1} B_{1}	Subcontrabass, triple bass	France	Extremely rare. Extant instruments tuned variously.	
Octofone	8 strings 4 courses	* C_{2} C_{2}•G_{2} G_{2}•D_{3} D_{3}•A_{3} A_{3}: G_{2} G_{2}•D_{3} D_{3}•A_{3} A_{3}•E_{4} E_{4}; D_{2} D_{2}•G_{2} G_{2}•B_{2} B_{2}•E_{3} E_{3}		USA	Any of the tunings may be considered "standard".	
Oud	11 strings 6 courses	Arabic tuning: C_{2} F_{2} A_{2} D_{3} G_{3} C_{4}: Alt. Arabic: F_{2} A_{2} D_{3} G_{3} C_{4} F_{4}: Alternate bass: D_{2} G_{2} A_{2} D_{3} G_{3} C_{4}: Ottoman Turkish/Armenian/Greek: E_{2} A_{2} B_{2} E_{3} A_{3} D_{4}: New Turkish Classical: C♯_{2} F♯_{2} B_{2} E_{3} A_{3} D_{4}: Alt. New Turkish Classical: D_{2} F♯_{2} B_{2} E_{3} A_{3} D_{4}	Ud, Al-Ud, Oud Arbi	Middle East	notated a 4th higher in ME notation; one octave higher in western notation.	

== P ==
Instrument	Strings & Courses	Tuning(s)	Alternative Names	Origin	Notes	Picture
Palida	4 strings 4 courses	D_{3} • A_{3} • E_{4} • B_{4}		Europe		
Panduri	3 strings 3 courses	Standard/common: G_{3} • A_{3} • C_{4} Alternate: E_{3} • B_{3} • A_{4}	Phanduri	Georgia (Asia)		
Pardessus de Viole	5 strings 5 courses	Standard: C_{4} • E_{4} • A_{4} • D_{5} • G_{5}	Soprano Viol	Europe	A member of the viol family. A rare 6-string version adds a G_{3} below the low C string.	
Pedal Steel Guitar	[ * ] 10 strings 10 courses	Standard/common: E9th: B_{2} D_{3} E_{3} F♯_{3} G♯_{3} B_{3} E_{4} G♯_{4} D♯_{4} F♯_{4}; C_{6}th: C_{2} F_{2} A_{2} C_{3} E_{3} G_{3} A_{3} C_{4} E_{4} D_{4}; Alternates: A_{7}th: A_{1} E_{2} G_{2} A_{2} C♯_{3} E_{3} G_{3} A_{3} C♯_{4} E_{4}; C Diatonic: G_{2} A_{2} C_{3} E_{3} F_{3} G_{3} A_{3} B_{3} C_{4} E_{4}	Steel guitar	United States	[ * ] 10 strings is more or less standard now, but instruments with 6, 8, 12, and other numbers of strings, and 2, 3, or 4 necks exist. A different tuning is usually applied to each neck, but setups vary from player to player.	2-Neck Pedal Steel Guitar
Phin	3 strings 3 courses	A_{3} E_{4} A_{4}		Thailand		
Piano	230 strings[*] 88 courses	A_{0} A♯_{0} B_{0} C_{1} C♯_{1} D_{1} D♯_{1} E_{1} F_{1} F♯_{1} G_{1} G♯_{1} [...] *C♯_{7} D_{7} D♯_{7} E_{7} F_{7} F♯_{7} G_{7} G♯_{7} A_{7} A♯_{7} B_{7} C_{8}	Pianoforte, Grand, Grand Piano, Concert Grand, Upright, Upright Piano, Spinet	Europe (Italy)	* About 2/3 of courses are triple strung; some lower courses are double strung; the remaining bases are single strung. All multi-strung courses are tuned to unisons. Exact number of strings varies by manufacturer and model, 220 – 240 is typical. Only lowest and highest octaves are shown; tuning of the intervening notes is chromatic.	Upright Piano: Grand Piano:
Piano, Imperial Grand	249 strings[*] 97 courses	C_{0} C♯_{0} D_{0} D♯_{0} E_{0} F_{0} F♯_{0} G_{0} G♯_{0} A_{0} A♯_{0} B_{0} [...] *C♯_{7} D_{7} D♯_{7} E_{7} F_{7} F♯_{7} G_{7} G♯_{7} A_{7} A♯_{7} B_{7} C_{8}	Imperial Grand, 290, Bösendorfer	Austria	* About 2/3 of courses are triple strung; some lower courses are double strung; the remaining bases are single strung. All multi-strung courses are tuned to unisons. Only lowest and highest octaves are shown; tuning of the intervening notes is chromatic. These extended-range pianos are very expensive and uncommon.	
Pipa	4 strings 4 courses	A_{2} D_{3} E_{3} A_{3}	Pi p'a	China		
Portuguese guitar	12 strings 6 courses	Lisbon / Lisboa tuning: D_{3} D_{2}•A_{3} A_{2}•B_{3} B_{2}•E_{3} E_{3}•A_{3} A_{3}•B_{3} B_{3}: Coimbra tuning: C_{3} C_{2} • G_{3} G_{2} • A_{3} A_{2} • D_{3} D_{3} • G_{3} G_{3} • A_{3} A_{3}	Guitarra Portuguesa	Portugal	Either tuning may be considered "standard".	
Prim		(See Bisernica, 5 string)				(See Bisernica, 5 string)

== Q ==
Instrument	Strings & Courses	Tuning(s)	Alternative Names	Origin	Notes	Picture
Qanbūs	7 stings 4 courses	C • D D • G G • C C	Gambus	Yemen		Syrian qanbūs.
Qinqin	3 strings 3 courses	G_{3} D_{4} A_{5}		China		

== R ==
Instrument	Strings & Courses	Tuning(s)	Alternative Names	Origin	Notes	Picture
Rajao	6 strings 5 courses	D_{4}•G_{4}•C_{4}•E_{4}•A_{4} (A_{4})	Rajão	Portugal	Sometimes the top course is not doubled, so there are only 5 strings	
Ramkie	4 strings 4 courses	C_{3} F_{3} A_{3} C_{4}	Afri-can, Kitaar	South Africa	Typically these are homemade, and therefore quite variable.	
Rebab	2 strings 2 courses	D_{3} A_{3} [*]		Java	* Tuning given is approximate: does not follow western equal temperament	
Requinto	6 strings 6 courses	A_{2} D_{3} G_{3} C_{4} E_{4} A_{4}	Requinto guitar	Mexico	4th above the standard guitar	
Ronroco	10 strings 5 courses	Standard Argentine (G_{6}/Em7): D_{4} D_{4}•G_{4} G_{4}•B_{4} B_{3}•E_{4} E_{4}•B_{4} B_{4} Standard Bolivian (F_{6}/Dm7): C_{4} C_{4}•F_{4} F_{4}•A_{4} A_{3}•D_{4} D_{4}•A_{4} A_{4} Standard Chilean (C_{6}/Am7): G_{3} G_{3}•C_{4} C_{4}•E_{4} E_{3}•A_{3} A_{3}•E_{4} E_{4} Common Variants: [*]: G_{4} G_{3}•C_{5} C_{4}•E_{4} E_{3}•A_{3} A_{3}•E_{4} E_{4}; G_{4} G_{3}•C_{5} C_{4}•E_{3} E_{3}•A_{3} A_{3}•E_{4} E_{4}	Baritone Charango, Ronrroco	Andean Region	[*] Instrument is still new enough that no one "standard" tuning has emerged. Chilean tuning (also a variant in Bolivia), one octave below the charango, is very common. Chilan variants (various octave doublings on courses 3, 4, and 5) depend on stringing—thinner strings are required for the high octaves in doubled courses. Argentine G_{6}/Em7 tuning is also popular, which basically raises the pitch to that of the charangón.	
Ruan		See under individual sizes	Ruanqin		See listing for individual sizes: soprano: Gaoyinruan; alto: Xiaoruan; tenor: Zhongruan; bass: Daruan; contrabass: Diyinruan	See under individual sizes
Ruanqin		See Ruan				See Ruan
Russian guitar	7 strings 7 courses	Standard/common: D_{2} G_{2} B_{2} D_{3} G_{3} B_{3} D_{4} Alternates: Drop C: C_{2} G_{2} B_{2} D_{3} G_{3} B_{4} D_{4}; French: D_{2} G_{2} C_{2} D_{3} G_{3} B_{4} D_{4}	Semistrunnaya gitara, semistrunka	Russia	There are many variant tunings, mostly idiosyncratic to individual performers.	

== S ==
Instrument	Strings & Courses	Tuning(s)	Alternative Names	Origin	Notes	Picture
Samica	4 strings 2 courses	Standard/common: B_{3} • E_{4} Alternate: A_{3} • D_{4}	Dangubica, tambura	Balkans	Tuning is flexible, but the courses are always a fourth apart.	
Sanshin	3 strings 3 courses	Standard/common: C_{3} • F_{3} • C_{4} Alternates: Ichi-agi chōshi: E♭_{3} • F_{3} • C_{4}; Ni-agi chōshi: C_{3} • G_{3} • C_{4}; Ichi, ni-agi chōshi: D_{3} • G_{3} • C_{4}; San-sage chōshi: C_{3} • F_{3} • B♭_{3}	Okinawa shamisen, jabisen	Ryukyu Islands, Japan	Standard aka Hon chōshi	
Santur	72 strings 18 courses	Golden strings (right); E♭_{3}•F_{3}•G_{3}•A♭_{3}•B♭_{3}•C_{4}•D_{4}•E♭_{4}•F_{4} Silver strings (left); E♭_{4}•F_{4}•G_{4}•A♭_{4}•B♭_{4}•C_{5}•D_{5}•E♭_{5}•F_{5} Silver strings (behind bridges); E♭_{5}•F_{5}•G_{5}•A♭_{5}•B♭_{5}•C_{6}•D_{6}•E♭_{6}•F_{6}		Iran, Turkey	This is common tuning for Dastgāh-e Šur	
Sanxian	3 strings 3 courses	Standard/common: A_{2} • D_{3} • A_{3} Alternate: D_{3} A_{3} D_{4}	Sanhsien, Small Sanxian, Xianzi, Quxian, Shuxian, Chinese Banjo	China		
Sanxian, Large	3 strings 3 courses	G_{2} • D_{3} • G_{3}	Sanhsien, Large Sanxian, Xianzi, Quxian, Shuxian, Chinese Banjo	China	Other size variants exist, but are uncommon.	
Sarangi, Nepalese	4 strings 4 courses	G_{4}•C_{5}•C_{5}•G_{5}		Nepal		
Sargija	6 strings 3 courses	C_{3} C_{3} • G_{3} G_{3} • D_{3} D_{3}	Sharkia, Sharki, Shargija	Albania		
Seis Cinco	6 strings 5 courses	E_{3}•A_{4} A_{3}•D_{3}•F♯_{4}•B_{4}	Seis Cinco	North-western Venezuela		
Setar	4 strings 3 courses	C_{3} C_{4} • G_{3} • C_{4}		Iran		
Shamisen	3 strings 3 courses	Standard/common: D G D Alternates: San sagari: D G C; Ni agari: D A D	Samisen, Sangen	Japan	Standard = "Honchoshi" tuning	
Sitar	7 strings (3 are drones) plus 13 sympathetic strings	C_{2} G_{2} C_{3} F_{3} drones: C_{5} C_{4} G_{3}		North India	4th string can be tuned to C. Sympathetic (resonating) strings are tuned to the raga being played.	
Socavon	4 strings 4 courses	G_{3} D_{4} A_{4} B_{2}	Bocona	Panama		
Strumstick	3 strings 3 courses	Standard/common: G_{3} D_{4} G_{4} Alternate: F_{3} C_{4} F_{4}	Dulcitar, Dulcimer stick, Strumbly, Standard Strumstick	US	Other sizes exist. General tuning is Root-5th-Octave, but the variations used are endless.	
Swedish lute (modern)	[*]	Standard / Common (12 strings / 12 courses): F_{1} G_{1} A_{1} B_{1} C_{2} D_{2} open E_{2} A_{2} D_{3} G_{3} B_{3} E_{4} over fretboard Open A / Sittra (15 strings / 15 courses): A_{1}, B_{1}, C#_{2}, D_{2}, E_{2}, F#_{2}, G#_{2} open A_{2}, B_{2}, C#_{3}, D_{3}, E_{3}, A_{3}, C#_{4}, E_{4} over fretboard	Scholander lute	Sweden	Other versions exist, mainly differing in the number of bass strings. Open A was developed in 1793-1794 for the original, most developed form (taken from a cittern).	

== T ==
Instrument	Strings & Courses	Tuning(s)	Alternative Names	Origin	Notes	Picture
Tambura	8 strings 4 courses	D_{3} D_{3} • G_{3} G_{3} • B_{3} B_{3} • E_{4} E_{4}	Tamboura	Bulgaria		
Tambura	4 strings 4 courses	sol do' do' do*	Tanpura, Tampuri, Tamboura, Taanpura	India	*Classical Indian music has no absolute pitch. "Do" is tuned to a convenient note for any singers, or for the Raga being played, and the other strings are tuned relative to that reference.	
Tambura	4 strings 2 courses	D D • A A	Tamboura	Macedonia		
Tar	6 strings 3 courses	Common (for Dastgāh-e Šur) C_{4} C_{4} • G_{3} G_{3} • C_{4} • C_{3}		Iran		
Tarica	5 strings 3 courses	Standard/common: C_{2} • G_{2} G_{2} • C_{3} C_{3} Alternate: Ionian: D_{2} • A_{2} A_{2} • D_{3} D_{3}	Tarika, Tricord, Trichord	Europe		
Taropatch	8 strings 4 courses	Standard: G_{3} G_{4} • C_{3} C_{4} • E_{4} E_{4} • A_{4} A_{4} Alternates: original: G_{4} G_{4} • C_{3} C_{3} • E_{4} E_{4} • A_{4} A_{4}: or Low G: G_{3} G_{3} • C_{3} C_{3} • E_{4} E_{4} • A_{4} A_{4}	8 string Tenor Ukulele	Hawaii	The name comes from "Taropatch Fiddle" an early Hawaiian, slightly derogatory name for all Ukuleles used by the "Landed" Anglo Settlers however it came over to Mainland U.S.A. with the fiddle part dropped to describe an 8 string Ukulele	
Tembor	5 strings 3 courses	A A•D•G G		China		
Terzin Kitarra	6 strings 6 courses	G♯_{2} B_{2} E_{3} A_{3} C♯_{4} E_{4}		Malta		
Theorbo	14 strings 14 courses	F_{1} G_{1} A_{1} B_{1}C_{2} D_{2} E_{2} F_{2} G_{2} A_{2} D_{3} G_{3} B_{3} E_{3}		Italy	May have as many as 19 courses, extending down to B_{0}	
Timple	5 strings 5 courses	G_{4} C_{5} E_{4} A_{4} D_{5}	Canary Island Tiple	Canary Islands, Spain		
Tiple, American	10 strings 4 courses	A_{4} A_{3} • D_{4} D_{3} D_{4} • F♯_{4} F♯_{3} F♯_{4} • B_{3} B_{3}	Tiple ukulele, Martin Tiple	US	The D and F♯ are triple-strung; the other strings are paired.	
Tiple, Columbian	12 strings 4 courses	Standard/Traditional: C_{4} C_{3} C_{4} • E_{4} E_{3} E_{4} • A_{4} A_{3} A_{4} • D_{4} D_{4} D_{4} Alternate: 'Guitar'/modern G_{6}: D_{4} D_{3} D_{4} • G_{4} G_{3} G_{4} • B_{4} B_{3} B_{4} • E_{4} E_{4} E_{4}	Tiple Colombiano	Colombia	Triple strung	
Tiple de Menorca	5 strings 5 courses	D_{4}•G_{4}•C_{5}•E_{5}•A_{5}		Menorca, Spain		
Tiple, Puerto Rican	5 strings 5 courses	E_{3} • A_{3} • D_{4} • G_{4} • C_{5}	Tiple Doliente	Puerto Rico		
Tiple Requinto	12 strings 4 courses	Standard/Traditional: C_{4} C_{4} C_{4} • E_{4} E_{4} E_{4} • A_{4} A_{4} A_{4} • D_{4} D_{4} D_{4} Alternate: 'Guitar'/modern G_{6}: D_{4} D_{4} D_{4} • G_{4} G_{4} G_{4} • B_{4} B_{4} B_{4} • E_{4} E_{4} E_{4}	Tiple Requinto Colombiano	Colombia	Triple strung: smaller than Tiple Colombiano, and central lower octave strings are replaced with unisons.	
Tres, Cuban	6 strings 3 courses	Standard/common: G_{4} G_{3}• C_{4} C_{4}• E_{3} E_{4} Alternate: New D major: A_{4} A_{3}• D_{4} D_{4} • F♯_{3} F♯_{4}	Tres, Tres Cubano	Cuba		
Tres, Puerto Rican	9 strings 3 courses	Standard/common: G_{4} G_{3} G_{4} • C_{4} C_{4} C_{4} • E_{4} E_{3} E_{4} Alternates: G_{3} G_{4} G_{4} • C_{4} C_{4} C_{4} • E_{4} E_{4} E_{3}; G_{4} G_{4} G_{3} • C_{4} C_{4} C_{4} • E_{3} E_{4} E_{4}	Tres, Tres Puerto Rico	Puerto Rico	Note that alternates simply change the location of the octave doublings.	
Tricordia	12 strings 4 courses	G_{2} G_{3} G_{3} • D_{3} D_{4} D_{4} • A_{3} A_{4} A_{4} • E_{4} E_{5} E_{5}	Mandriola	Mexico	Although tuned differently from the mandriola, both instruments are known by both names	
Tzouras	6 strings 3 courses	D_{3} D_{4} • A_{3} A_{3} • D_{4} D_{4}	6 strings/3 courses	Tzouras	Greece	

== U ==
Instrument	Strings & Courses	Tuning(s)	Alternative Names	Origin	Notes	Picture
Ukulele, Baritone	4 strings 4 courses	Standard/common: D_{3} G_{3} B_{3} E_{4} Alternate (rare): High D: D_{4} G_{3} B_{3} E_{4}	Baritone Uke, Bari Uke	U.S.A.	Same as 4 highest-pitched guitar strings	
Ukulele, bass	4 strings 4 courses	E_{2} A_{2} D_{3} G_{3}	Bass Ukulele, bass Uke	US	Same as bottom four strings of the guitar. A relatively new instrument; unlike the UBass (see below) it has sufficient volume to be played acoustically, and sounds more like a uke than a bass.	
Ukulele, contrabass ("UBass")	4 strings 4 courses	E_{1} A_{1} D_{2} G_{2}	Bass Uke, contrabass Ukulele, Rubber Bass, Travel Bass, U-Bass	US	Same as bass guitar. A relatively new instrument that has to be amplified to be heard; tone is much like a double bass. Compared to the acoustic bass uke (see above), this is really a contrabass instrument.	
Ukulele, Concert	4 strings 4 courses	Standard/common: G_{4} C_{4} E_{4} A_{4} Alternate: D_{6}: A_{4} D_{4} F♯_{4} B_{4}	Uke, Alto Ukulele	U.S.A	The size up from a Soprano. The original name was used to try and convey that the Ukulele in question was a better and more professional than the standard model. The current size comes from when C. F. Martin & Co. started making a 4 string version of their Taropatch.	
Ukulele, Pocket	4 strings 4 courses	Standard/common: D_{5} G_{4} B_{4} E_{5} Alternate: C_{5} F_{4} A_{4} D_{5}	Pocket Uke, Mini Uke, Sopranino Ukulele, Sopranissimo Ukulele	Hawaii	a miniature ukulele first produced by the Hawaiian maker Jonah Kumalae very early in the 20th century which he referred to as a Mini	
Ukulele, Soprano	4 strings 4 courses	Standard/common: G_{4} C_{4} E_{4} A_{4} Alternate (traditional): D_{6}: A_{4} D_{4} F♯_{4} B_{4}; Low G: G_{3} C_{4} E_{4} A_{4}	Uke	Hawaii	The standard, basic ukulele. Traditionally, D_{6} tuning was used though C_{6} tuning is now most common.	
Ukulele, Tahitian	8 strings 4 courses	G_{4} G_{4} • C_{5} C_{5} • E_{5} E_{5} • A_{4} A_{4}	Tahitian banjo, Tahitian Ukulele, Ukulélé Tahitien, Youke	Tahiti	This is a fairly modern instrument that was developed in the last quarter of the 20th century	
Ukulele, tenor	4 strings 4 courses	Standard/common: G_{4} C_{4} E_{4} A_{4} Alternate: Low G: G_{3} C_{4} E_{4} A_{4}	Uke, tenor Uke	Hawaii	5-, 6- and 8- string versions exist: 5-string has 4th (lowest)) course doubled; 6-string has 1st (highest) and 3rd courses doubled (see Taropatch); 8-string has all 4 courses doubled (see Lili'u)	

== V ==
Instrument	Strings & Courses	Tuning(s)	Alternative Names	Origin	Notes	Picture
Veena	7 strings 7 courses	C_{3} • D_{3} • E_{3} • F_{3} • G_{3} • A_{3} • B_{3}	Vina, Saraswati Veena; Sawaswati Vina	South India	Pitches are approximate: does not use the western equal tempered tuning system.	
Vihuela	5 strings 5 courses	A_{3} • D_{4} • G_{4} • B_{3} • E_{4}		Mexico	This is the modern Mariachi instrument. Vihuela also refers to many historic antecedents of the guitar, in various configurations, most of them currently obsolete.	
Viol, alto	6 strings 6 courses	C_{3} F_{3} A_{3} D_{4} G_{4} C_{5}		Europe		
Viol, baritone	6 strings 6 courses	F_{2} A_{2} D_{3} G_{3} C_{4} F_{4}	Alto-tenor viola da gamba (Fidel) named by Wulf	Europe		
Viol, bass	6 strings 6 courses	D_{2} G_{2} C_{3} E_{3} A_{3} D_{4}	Tenor viola da gamba (Fidel) named by Wulf	Europe		
Viol, bass	7 strings 7 courses	A_{1} D_{2} G_{2} C_{3} E_{3} A_{3} D_{4}		Europe		
Viol, contrabass	6 strings 6 courses	D_{1} G_{1} C_{2} E_{2} A_{2} D_{3}	Violone, D'violone	Europe	octave lower than the 6-string bass viol	
Viol, Soprano		See Pardessus de Viole				See Pardessus de Viole
Viol, tenor	6 strings 6 courses	G_{2} C_{3} F_{3} A_{3} D_{4} G_{4}	Viol da gamba, viola da gamba, alto viola da gamba (Fidel) named by Wulf	Europe		
Viol, treble	6 strings 6 courses	D_{3} G_{3} C_{4} E_{4} A_{4} D_{5}	Soprano viola da gamba (Fidel) named by Wulf	Europe		
Viola	4 strings 4 courses	C_{3} G_{3} D_{4} A_{4}		Europe	Pitched a 5th below the violin.	
Viola amarantina	10 strings 5 courses	D_{3} D_{2}•A_{3} A_{2}•B_{3} B_{2}•E_{3} E_{3}•A_{3} A_{3}	Viola aramante, viola de dois coracois	Amarante, Portugal		
Viola beiroa	12 strings 7 courses	D_{3}•D_{3}•A_{3} A_{2}•D_{3} D_{2}•G_{3} G_{2}•B_{3} B_{3}•D_{3} D_{3}		Portugal		
Viola braguesa	10 strings 5 courses	C_{4} C_{3}•G_{4} G_{3}•A_{4} A_{3}•D_{4} D_{4}•G_{4} G_{4}	Viola da braga	Portugal		
Viola caipira	10 strings 5 courses	A_{3} A_{2} • D_{4} D_{3} • F♯_{4} F♯_{3} • A_{3} A_{3} • D_{4} D_{4}	Viola de dez cordes, viola sertaneja	Brazil		
Viola campaniça	10 strings 5 courses	C_{3} C_{2} • F_{3} F_{2} • C_{3} C_{3} • E_{3} E_{3} • G_{3} G_{3}	Viola de beja	Portugal		
Viola da gamba		See Viol, tenor				See Viol, tenor
Viola da terra	12 strings 5 courses	A_{3} A_{3} A_{2}•D_{4} D_{4} D_{3}•G_{3} G_{3}•B_{3} B_{3}•D_{4} D_{4}		Azores (Portugal)		
Viola de arame	9 strings 5 courses	G_{3} G_{2}•D_{3} D_{2}•G_{3} G_{3}•B_{3}•D_{3} D_{3}	Viola de Madeira	Madeira, Portugal		
Viola de cocho	5 strings 5 courses	G_{3} • D_{3} • E_{3} • A_{3} • D_{4}		Mato Grosso, South-western Brazil		
Violão de sete cordas	7 strings 7 courses	Standard/common: C_{2}•E_{2}•A_{2}•D_{3}•G_{3}•B_{3}•E_{4} Alternate: B_{2}•E_{2}•A_{2}•D_{3}•G_{3}•B_{3}•E_{4}		Brazil		
Viola sertaneja	10 strings 5 courses	[*] A_{3} A_{2}•D_{4} D_{2}•F♯_{4} F♯_{3}•B_{3}•A_{3} A_{3} A_{3}•D_{4}•G_{4} G_{4}•B_{3}•B_{3} B_{3} B_{3}•E_{4} E_{4} E_{4}	Viola nordestina	Brazil	Two different arrangements are employed for the courses: 2-2-2-2-2 (1st tuning) or 1-1-2-3-3 (2nd tuning)	
Viola Terceira	15 strings 6 courses	E_{3} E_{3} E_{2}•A_{3} A_{3} A_{2}•D_{4} D_{4} D_{3}•G_{4} G_{3}•B_{3} B_{3}•E_{4} E_{4}	Viola da Terceira, Viola Terceirense	Azores (Portugal)		
Viola toeira	12 strings 5 courses	A_{3} A_{3} A_{2} • D_{4} D_{4} D_{3} • G_{4} G_{3} • B_{3} B_{3} • E_{3} E_{3}		Portugal		
Violin	4 Strings 4 courses	G_{3} D_{4} A_{4} E_{5}	Fiddle (colloquial)	Lombardy	For other tunings see fiddle	
Violin, tenor	4 Strings 4 courses	Standard/common: G_{2} D_{3} A_{3} E_{4} Alternate: F_{2} C_{3} G_{3} D_{4}	Tenor violin, baritone violin, violotta, tenor cello	USA	Standard is one octave below the violin; 4th below the viola. Rare.	

== W ==
Instrument	Strings & Courses	Tuning(s)	Alternative Names	Origin	Notes	Picture
Walaycho	10 strings 5 courses	*Bolivian (F_{6}): C_{5} C_{5}•F_{5} F_{5}•A_{5} A_{4}•D_{5} D_{5}•A_{5} A_{5}: Argentine (G_{6}): D_{5} D_{5}•G_{5} G_{5}•B_{5} B_{4}•E_{5} E_{5}•B_{5} B_{5}	Waylacho, hualaycho, maulincho	Andean region	A soprano charango F_{6} = 4th higher than the charango G_{6} = 5th higher than the charango	
Waldzither, bass	9 strings 5 courses	Standard/common: A_{2} • E_{3} E_{3}•A_{3} A_{3}•C♯_{4} C♯_{4}•E_{4} E_{4}		Germany		
Waldzither, descant	9 strings 5 courses	Standard/common: G_{3} • D_{4} D_{4}•G_{4} G_{4}•B_{4} B_{4}•D_{5} D_{5}	Bergmannszither, Walddoline	Germany		
Waldzither, Heym	14 strings 6 courses	Standard/common: C_{2} C_{2}•G_{3} G_{3} G_{3}•C_{4} C_{4} C_{4}•E_{4} E_{4} E_{4}•G_{4} G_{4} G_{4}		Germany	Very rare, and possibly obsolete	
Waldzither, piccolo	9 strings 5 courses	Standard/common: C_{4} • G_{4} G_{4}•C_{5} C_{5}•E_{5} E_{5}•G_{5} G_{5} Alternates: D tuning: D_{4} • A_{4} A_{4}•D_{5} D_{5}•F♯_{5} F♯_{5}•A_{5} A_{5}		Germany		
Waldzither, tenor	9 strings 5 courses	Standard/common: C_{3} • G_{3} G_{3}•C_{4} C_{4}•E_{4} E_{4}•G_{4} G_{4} Alternates: D tuning: D_{3} • A_{3} A_{3}•D_{4} D_{4}•F♯_{4} F♯_{4}•A_{4} A_{4}; Open G major: G_{2} • D_{3} D_{3}•G_{3} G_{3}•B_{3} B_{3}•D_{4} D_{4}	Waldzither, Forest zither	Germany	The tenor is the standard waldzither; several other, less common tunings are also used	

== X ==
Instrument	Strings & Courses	Tuning(s)	Alternative Names	Origin	Notes	Picture
Xenorphica	73 strings 73 courses	F_{1} F♯_{2} G_{1} G♯_{1} A_{1} A♯_{1} B_{1} C_{2} C♯_{2} D_{2} D♯_{2} E_{2}[...] * F♯_{6} G_{6} G♯_{6} A_{6} A♯_{6} B_{6} C_{7} C♯_{7} D_{7} D♯_{7} E_{7} F_{7}	Claviharp, harp piano, keyed harp	Austria	Only lowest and highest octaves are shown; tuning of the intervening notes is chromatic. Rare.	
Xiaoruan	4 strings 4 courses	D_{3} A_{3} D_{4} A_{4}'	Alto Ruan	China	lit. "small Ruan"	

== Y ==
Instrument	Strings & Courses	Tuning(s)	Alternative Names	Origin	Notes	Picture
Yakumogoto		See Nigenkin				See Nigenkin
Yaylı tambur	6 strings 3 courses	D_{2} D_{2}•A_{2} A_{2}•D_{3} D_{3}	Turkish tambur	Turkey	the bowed variant (versus the mızraplı tambur, the plucked variant) of the Turkish tambur	
Yueqin	4 strings 4 courses	G_{3}•D_{4}•G_{4}•D_{5}	Yueh qin, Yueh chin, Moon guitar	China		
Yueqin, Taiwanese	2 strings 2 courses	D_{3}•A_{4}	Hengchun yueqin, Yueh qin, Yueh chin, Moon guitar	Taiwan		

== Z ==
Instrument	Strings & Courses	Tuning(s)	Alternative Names	Origin	Notes	Picture
Zheng	18 strings 18 courses	Common: C_{2} D_{2} E_{2} G_{2} A_{2} C_{3} D_{4} E_{4} G_{4} A_{4} C_{4} D_{4} E_{4} G_{4} A_{4} C_{5} D_{5} E_{5}	Guzheng, Gu Zheng, Pinyin	China	Tuning is not absolute, and is not limited by Western equal temperament. Zhengs also come with varying numbers of strings, typically from 16–26; the pentatonic tuning is extended to accommodate these extra (high and low) strings.	
Zhonghu	2 strings 2 courses	G_{3} D_{4}; A_{3} E_{4}		China	Either tuning may be considered "standard".	
Zhongruan	4 strings 4 courses	Standard/common: G_{2} D_{3} G_{3} D_{4} Alternates: G_{2} D_{3} A_{3} E_{4} (Mandolin); A_{2} E_{3} A_{3} E_{4}	Tenor Ruan, ruanjian, ruanqin	China	lit. "medium Ruan"; This is the standard/most common instrument of the five-member ruan family.	
Zither, Alpine	5 fretted strings[*] 5 courses plus 37 open accompaniment & bass strings	Fretted strings standard/common: A_{4} A_{4} D_{4} G_{3} C_{3} Alternate: Vienna: A_{4} D_{4} G_{3} G_{3} C_{3}; [See ZITHER TUNING CHART, below, for unfretted string tunings]	Alpine Zither, Harp Zither	Austria, Germany, elsewhere.	Standard Tuning aka "Munich" [*]: 5 fretted melody strings; 12 unfretted accompaniment strings; 12 unfretted bass strings; 13 unfretted contrabass strings	
Zither, Concert	5 fretted strings[*] 5 courses plus 29 – 30 open accompaniment & bass strings	Fretted strings standard/common: A_{4} A_{4} D_{4} G_{3} C_{3} Alternate: Vienna: A_{4} D_{4} G_{3} G_{3} C_{3}; [See ZITHER TUNING CHART, below, for unfretted string tunings]	Concert Zither, Fretted Zither	America, Germany, elsewhere.	Standard aka "Munich" [*]: 5 fretted melody strings; 12 unfretted accompaniment strings; 12 unfretted bass strings; up to 13 unfretted contrabass strings (5 or 6 is the most common)	
Zither, guitar	Varies	Varied open string chord sets and chromatic or diatonic tuning of additional open strings. The string tuning is often printed on the instrument itself. See the picture. No frets nor fingerboard.	Guitar zither, chord zither, fretless zither	Austria, Germany, elsewhere.	May have from 12 to 50 strings, or more, depending on design: See also Autoharp which has diatonic and chromatic open strings, and a stop mechanism to produce chords.	

== Zither tuning chart ==
ZITHER TUNING CHART
		FRETTED					UNFRETTED																																				
STRING		Melody					Accompaniment												Basses												Countrabasses												
STRING		1	2	3	4	5	6	7	8	9	10	11	12	13	14	15	16	17	18	19	20	21	22	23	24	25	26	27	28	29	30	31	32	33	34	35	36	37	38	39	40	41	42
PITCH	Munich	A_{4}	A_{4}	D_{4}	G_{3}	C_{3}	E♭_{4}	B♭_{3}	F_{4}	C_{4}	G_{3}	D_{4}	A_{3}	E_{4}	B_{3}	F♯_{3}	C♯_{4}	G♯_{3}	E♭_{3}	B♭_{2}	F_{3}	C_{3}	G_{2}	D_{3}	A_{2}	E_{3}	B_{2}	F♯_{2}	C♯_{3}	G♯_{2}	F_{2}	E_{2}	E♭_{2}	D_{2}	C♯_{2}	C_{2}	B_{1}	B♭_{1}	A_{1}	G♯_{1}	G_{1}	F♯_{1}	F_{1}
PITCH	Viennese	A_{4}	D_{4}	G_{3}	G_{3}	C_{3}	Ab4	E♭_{4}	B♭_{3}	F_{4}	C_{4}	G_{4}	D_{4}	A_{3}	E_{4}	B_{3}	F♯_{4}	C♯_{4}	G♯_{3}	E♭_{2}	B♭_{2}	F_{2}	C_{3}	G_{2}	D_{2}	A_{2}	E_{2}	B_{2}	F♯_{2}	C♯_{2}	G♯_{2}	C_{2}	B_{1}	B♭_{1}	A_{1}	G♯	G_{1}	F♯_{1}	F_{1}				
Notes:		Basic																													Concert						Alpine						

== See also ==
- Bass guitar tunings
- Guitar tunings
- Plucked string instrument list
- Scale (string instruments)
- Scordatura
- Violin tunings
