= Dahu (instrument) =

Chinese bowed string instrument

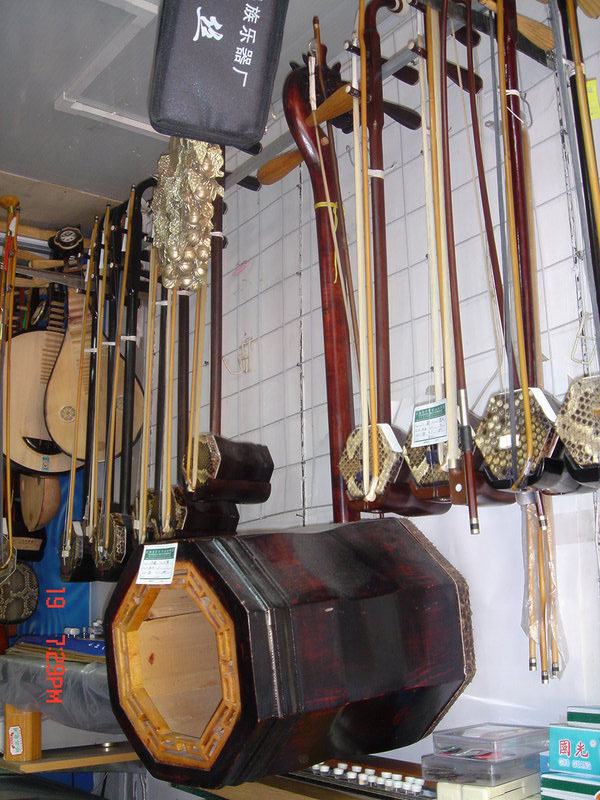
- Dahu, (center).
- Classification: Bowed string instrument

Related instruments
- Erhu; Huqin

The dahu (Chinese: 大胡; pinyin: dàhú) is a large bowed string instrument from China. It has a large soundbox covered on one end with python skin. Like most other members of the huqin family of instruments, it has two strings and is held vertically. The instrument is generally pitched one octave below the erhu, and is considerably larger than the erhu. Its name derives from the Chinese word for "large" (dà), and the word hú (short for huqin). Its bridge is often placed somewhat above the center of the snakeskin to avoid stretching the skin.

The dahu is sometimes also called cizhonghu. It is also referred to as xiaodihu, being the same instrument as the smallest of the three sizes of dihu (large huqin instruments), the others being the zhongdihu and dadihu.

== History ==
The dahu was developed in the 1930s as the tenor member of the erhu family (the erhu being the soprano member and the zhonghu being the alto member) to increase the pitch range of the instruments used in a Chinese orchestra and allow music with harmony to be played. However, by the late 20th century it had largely fallen into disuse. Part of the reason for this is that it is unwieldy to play. Also, that (like other instruments in the huqin family) the bow passes between the instrument's two strings means that playing pizzicato is difficult; thus, the larger gehu and diyingehu, laruan, or cello and double bass are generally used in Chinese orchestras for the lower bowed string voices instead.

== See also ==
- Dihu
- Huqin
- Chinese music
- List of Chinese musical instruments
