= Ruan (instrument) =

Chinese plucked string instrument

- Chinese: 阮
Transcriptions
Standard Mandarin
- Hanyu Pinyin: ruǎn
- Yale Romanization: rwǎn
Yue: Cantonese
- Jyutping: jyun5

Alternative Chinese name
- Chinese: 阮咸
Transcriptions
Standard Mandarin
- Hanyu Pinyin: ruǎnxián
- Yale Romanization: rwǎn-syán

Second alternative Chinese name
- Chinese: 阮琴
Transcriptions
Standard Mandarin
- Hanyu Pinyin: ruǎnqín
- Yale Romanization: rwǎn-chín

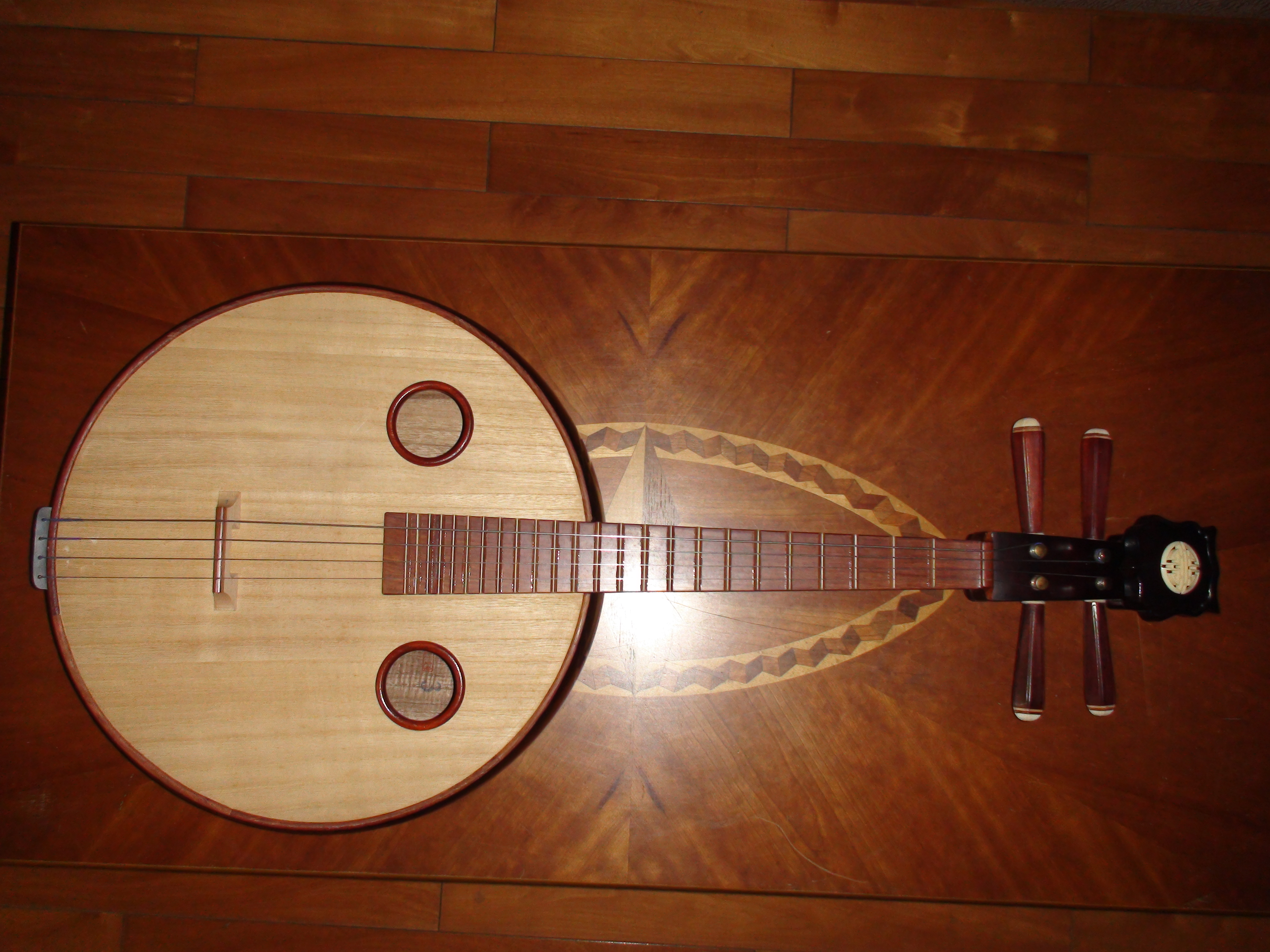
A ruan as seen from the front

The ruan (Chinese: 阮; pinyin: ruǎn) is a traditional Chinese plucked string instrument. It is a lute with a fretted neck, a circular body, and four strings. Its four strings were formerly made of silk but since the 20th century they have been made of steel (flatwound for the lower strings). The modern ruan has 24 frets with 12 semitones on each string, which has greatly expanded its range from a previous 13 frets. The frets are commonly made of ivory or in recent times of metal mounted on wood. The metal frets produce a brighter tone as compared to the ivory frets. It is sometimes called ruanqin, particularly in Taiwan.

== Sizes ==
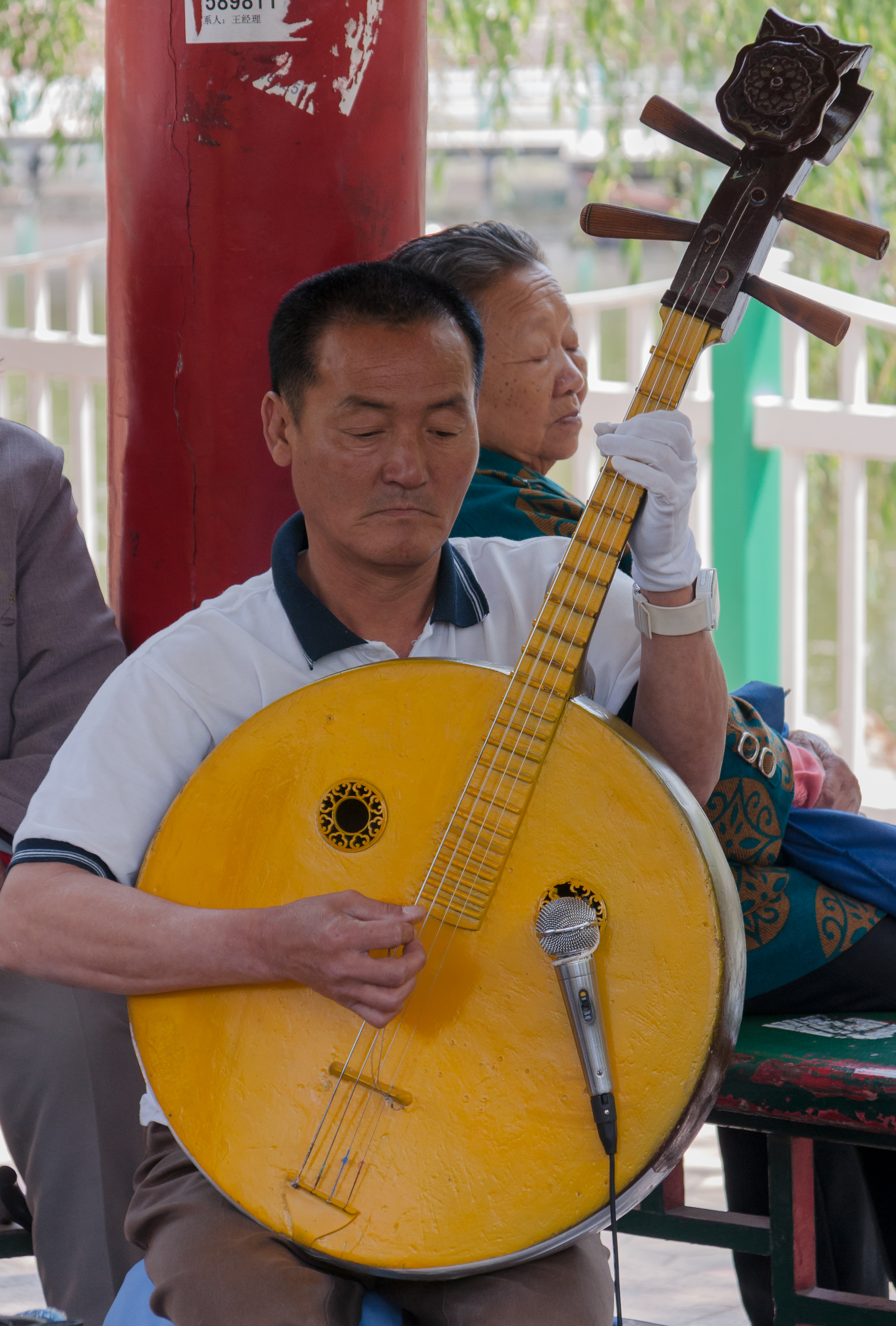
A bass daruan (大阮) or contrabass diyinruan (低音阮)

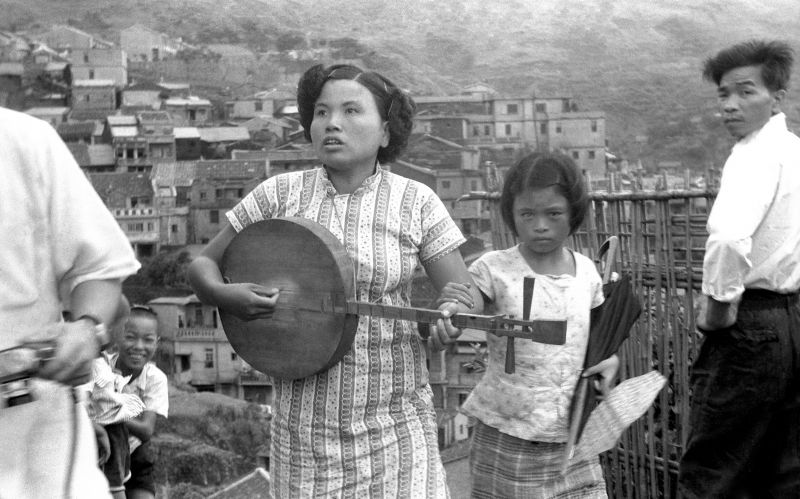
Long-necked lute, which could possibly be a zhongruan (中阮, lit. "medium ruan"), except it has only two courses of strings instead of four individual strings, and no large soundholes. Another possibility is a southern yueqin.

The ruan comes in a family of five sizes:

- soprano: gaoyinruan (高音阮, lit. "high pitched ruan"; tuning: G3-D4-G4-D5)
- alto: xiaoruan (小阮, lit. "small ruan"; tuning: D3-A3-D4-A4)
- tenor: zhongruan (中阮, lit. "medium ruan"; tuning: G2-D3-G3-D4)
- bass: daruan (大阮, lit. "large ruan"; tuning: D2-A2-D3-A3)
- contrabass: diyinruan (低音阮, lit. "low pitched ruan"; tuning: G1-D2-G2-D3)

The ruan is now most commonly used in Chinese opera and the Chinese orchestra, where it belongs to the plucked string (弹拨乐 or chordophone) section.

== Playing techniques and usage ==
The instrument can be played using a plectrum similar to a guitar pick (formerly made of animal horn, but today often plastic), or using a set of two or five acrylic nails that are affixed to the fingers with adhesive tape. Mainstream ruan players use plectrums, though there are some schools which teach the fingernail technique, similar to that of the pipa. Pipa players who play ruan as a second instrument also often use their fingernails. Plectrums produce a louder and more clear tone, while fingernails allow the performance of polyphonic solo music. The instrument produces a mellow tone.

In Chinese orchestras, only the zhongruan and daruan are commonly used, to fill in the tenor and bass section of the plucked string section. Occasionally the gaoyinruan is used to substitute the high-pitched liuqin.

Daruan soloists generally use the D-A-D-A tuning, as it allows for the easy performance of diatonic chords. Some orchestral players tune to C-G-D-A, which is exactly the same as cello tuning. The advantage of using C-G-D-A in orchestras is so that the daruan can easily double the cello part.

A ruan ensemble (重奏) consists of two or more members of the ruan family, for instance, an ensemble of the xiaoruan, zhongruan and daruan. The wide range covered by the ruan, its easily blended tone quality, and the variety of soprano, alto, tenor, bass, and contrabass instruments all make ruan ensembles very effective in playing polyphonic music.

== History ==
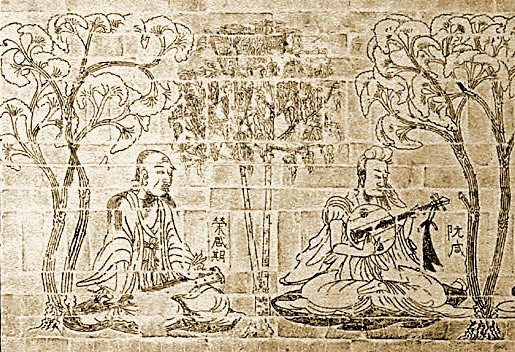
Depiction of Ruan Xian playing a Ruan (figure on right) found in an Eastern Jin or Southern dynasties tomb near Nanjing, dated around 400 AD.

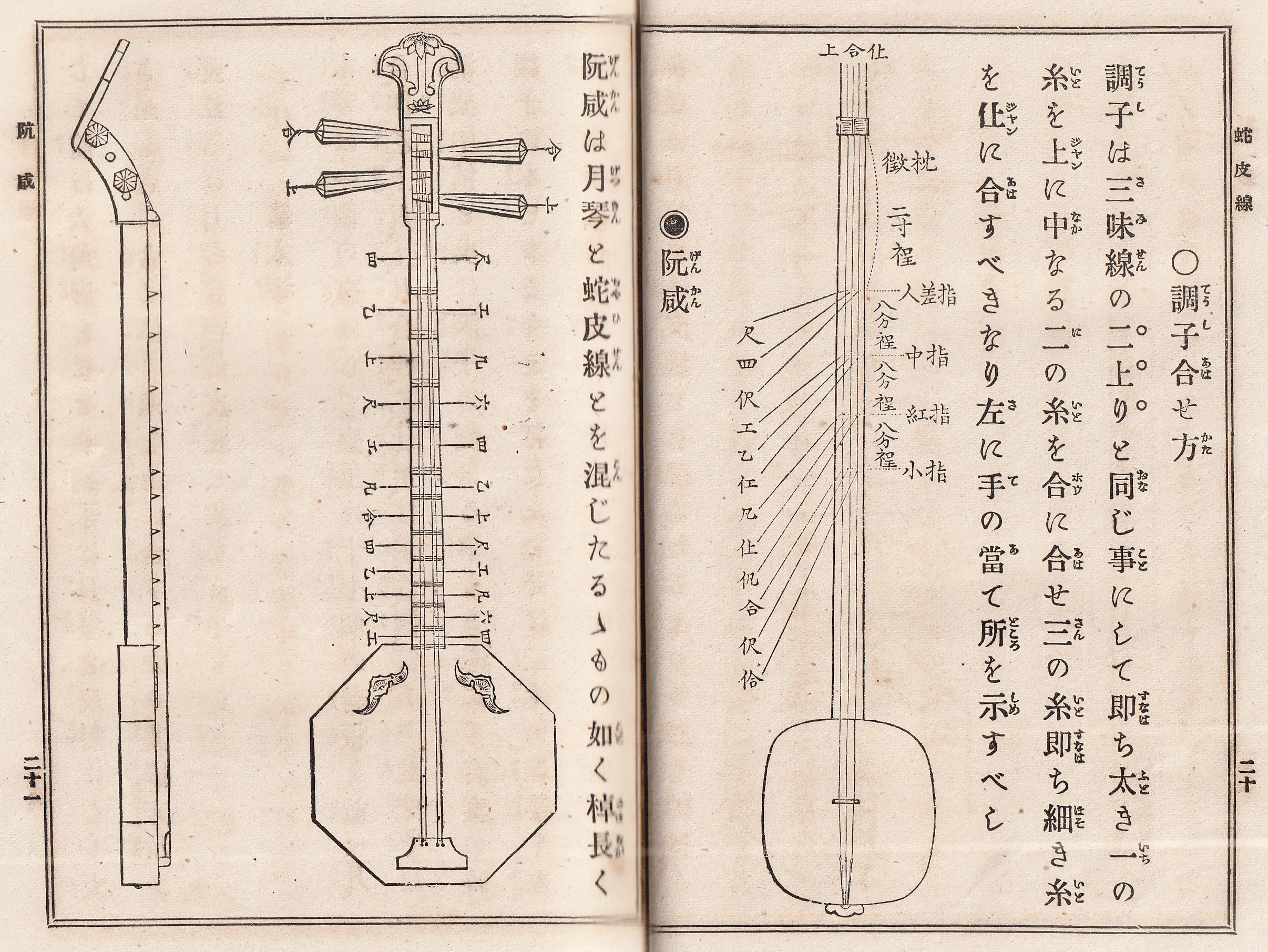
An explanation from a Japanese book published in 1894

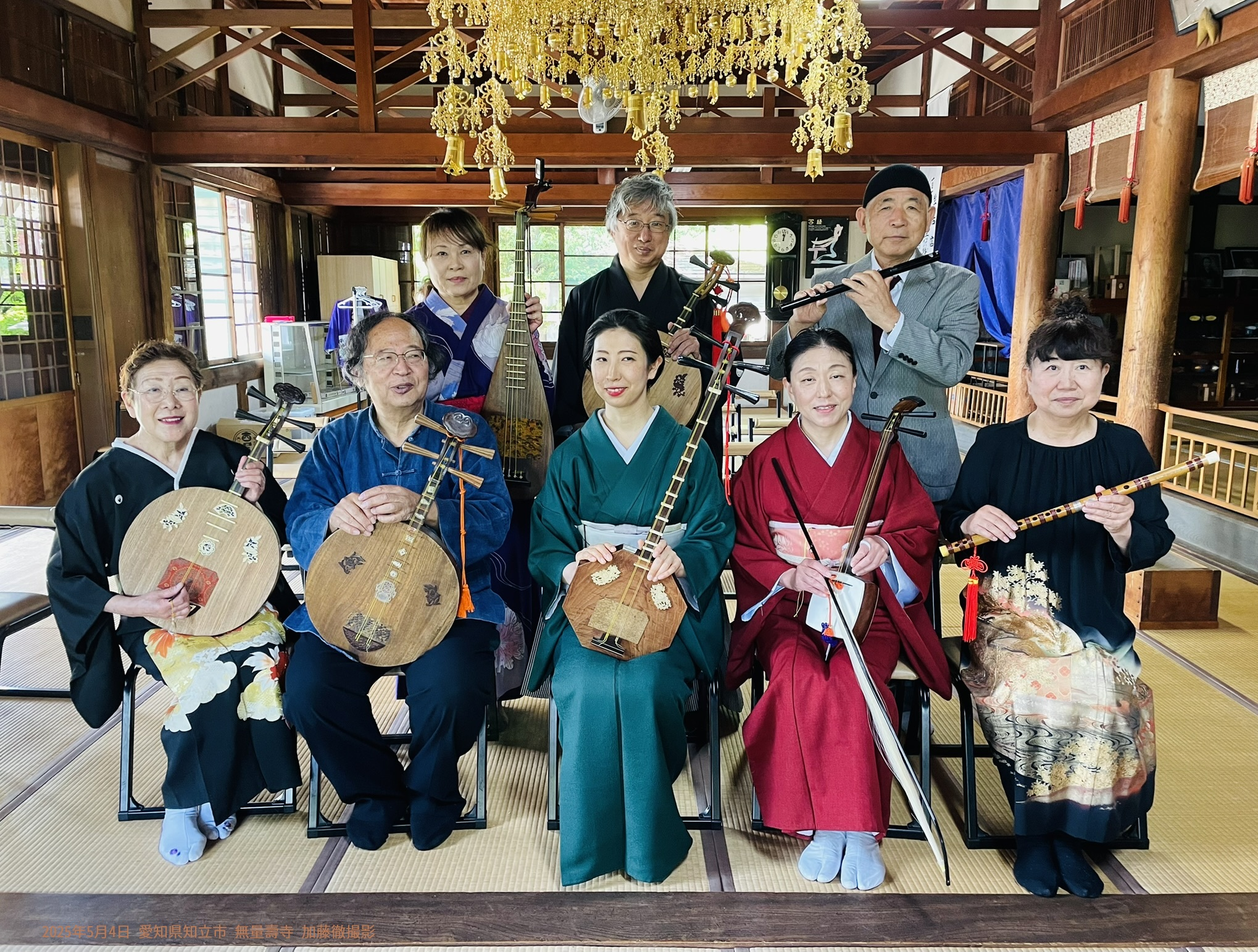
Ruanxian (阮咸) used in Japanese MINSHINGAKU or “Ming and Qing Music.” Held by the front-row center woman.

Ruan may have a history of over 2,000 years, the earliest form may be the qin pipa (秦琵琶), which was then developed into ruanxian (named after Ruan Xian, 阮咸), shortened to ruan (阮). In old Chinese texts from the Han to the Tang dynasty, the term pipa was used as a generic term for a number plucked chordophones, including ruan, therefore does not necessarily mean the same as the modern usage of pipa which refers only to the pear-shaped instrument. According to the Pipa Annals 琵琶赋 by Fu Xuan (傅玄) of the Western Jin dynasty, the pipa was designed after revision of other Chinese plucked string instruments of the day such as the Chinese zither, zheng (筝) and zhu (筑), or konghou (箜篌), the Chinese harp. However, it is believed that ruan may have been descended from an instrument called xiantao (弦鼗) which was constructed by labourers on the Great Wall of China during the late Qin dynasty (hence the name Qin pipa) using strings stretched over a pellet drum.

The antecedent of ruan in the Qin dynasty (221 BC – 206 BC), i.e. the Qin pipa, had a long, straight neck with a round sound box in contrast to the pear-shape of pipa of later dynasties. The name of "pipa" is associated with "tantiao" (彈挑), a right hand techniques of playing a plucked string instrument. "Pi" (琵), which means "tan" (彈), is the downward movement of plucking the string. "Pa" (琶), which means "tiao" (挑), is the upward movement of plucking the string.

The present name of the Qin pipa, which is "ruan", was not given until the Tang dynasty (8th century). During the reign of Empress Wu Zetian (武則天) (about 684–704 AD), a copper instrument that looked like the Qin pipa was discovered in an ancient tomb in Sichuan (四川). It had 13 frets and a round sound box. It was believed that it was the instrument which the Eastern Jin (東晉) musician Ruan Xian (阮咸) loved to play. Ruan Xian was a scholar in the Three Kingdoms Eastern Jin (三國東晉) dynasty period (3rd century). He and six other scholars disliked the corrupt government, so they gathered in a bamboo grove in Shanyang (山陽, now in Henan [河南] province). They drank, wrote poems, played music and enjoyed the simple life. The group was known as the Seven Sages of the Bamboo Grove (竹林七賢). Since Ruan Xian was an expert and famous in playing an instrument that looked like the Qin pipa, the instrument was named after him as ruanxian (阮咸) when the copper Qin pipa was found in a tomb during the Tang dynasty. Today it is shortened to ruan (阮).

Also during the Tang dynasty, a ruanxian was brought to Japan from China. Now this ruanxian is still stored in Shosoin of the Nara National Museum in Japan. The ruanxian was made of red sandalwood and decorated with mother of pearl inlay. The ancient ruanxian shows that the look of today's ruan has not changed much since the 8th century.

Nowadays, although the ruan was never as popular as the pipa, the ruan has been divided into several smaller and better-known instruments within the recent few centuries, such as yueqin ("moon" lute, 月琴) and qinqin (Qin [dynasty] lute, 秦琴) . The short-necked yueqin, with no sound holes, is now used primarily in Beijing opera accompaniment. The long-necked qinqin is a member of both Cantonese (廣東) and Chaozhou (潮州) ensembles.

The famed Tang poet Bai Juyi (白居易) once penned a poem about the ruan, entitled "Having a Little Drink and Listening to the Ruanxian with the Deputy Minister of Linghu" (和令狐仆射小饮听阮咸; He Linghu Puye Xiao Yin Ting Ruanxian)

和令狐僕射小飲聽阮咸

掩抑復淒清，非琴不是箏。
還彈樂府曲，別占阮家名。
古調何人識，初聞滿座驚。
落盤珠歷歷，搖佩玉琤琤。
似勸杯中物，如含林下情。
時移音律改，豈是昔時聲。

— Bai Juyi (白居易; Tang dynasty, 772–846)
Translation:
Having a Little Drink and Listening to the Ruanxian with the Deputy Minister of Linghu

Gloom and melancholy compounded with misery and desolation;
It's not a qin, and neither is it a zheng.
It still plays yuefu songs,
And also bears the Ruan family name.
Of ancient melodies, who [today] knows them?
[Yet] upon first listen, all those in attendance are left in awe.
Pearls fall on a platter, one by one;
Shaken pendants of jade jangle.
As if to urge [listeners to drain] the contents of their winecups,
Or to harbor emotions [such as one might feel while lying] beneath a grove [of flowering plum trees].
As the times change, so too does music;
Can this be the sound of former times?

== Ruan and Pipa ==
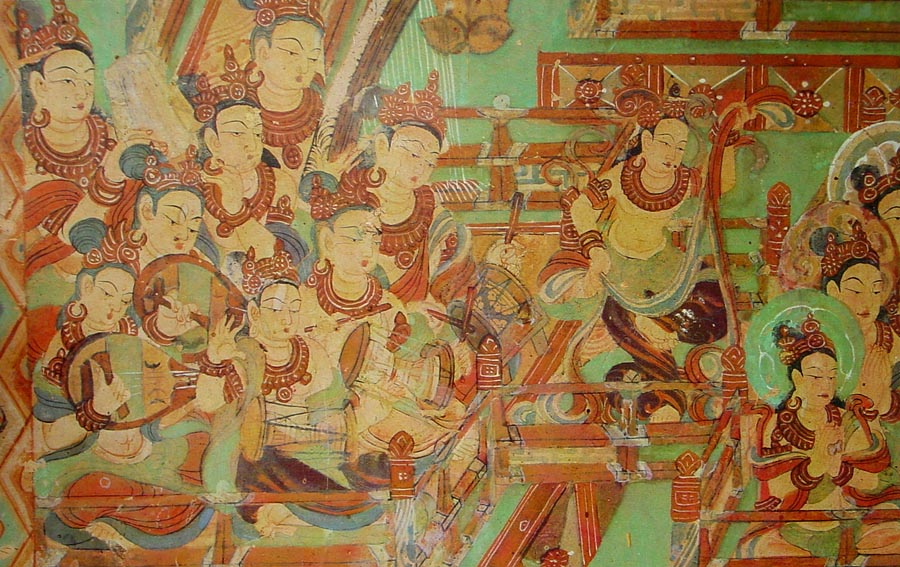
This is a part of the Dunhuang fresco. Two pipa players are shown at the left-hand corner.

A small pipa was found in murals of tombs in Liaoning (遼寧) province in northeastern China. The date of these tombs is about late Eastern Han (東漢) or Wei (魏) period (220–265 AD). However, the pear-shaped pipa was not brought to China from Dunhuang (敦煌, now in northwestern China) until the Northern Wei period (386–524 AD) when ancient China traded with the western countries through the Silk Road (絲綢之路). Evidence was shown on the Dunhuang Caves frescoes that the frescoes contain a large number of pipa, and they date to 4th to 5th century.

During the Han period (206 BC-220 AD), Lady Wang Zhaojun (王昭君, known as one of the Four Beauties [四大美人] in ancient China) departed mainland to the west and married the Grand Khan of the Huns. The marriage was meant to maintain peace between the two ancient countries. On her way to the west, she carried a pipa on the horse. Looking back today, her pipa must have been a ruan-type instrument with a round sound box, since the pear-shaped pipa was not brought to China until the Northern Wei dynasty after the Han dynasty. However, in almost all the portraits and dramas, Lady Zhaojun's pipa is displayed inaccurately. The pipa is usually shown with a pear-shaped sound box (as in today's pipa), rather than a round sound box.

Note that the frets on all Chinese lutes are high so that the fingers never touch the actual body—distinctively different from western fretted instruments. This allows for a greater control over timbre and intonation than their western counterparts, but makes chordal playing more difficult.

== Laruan (bowed ruan) ==
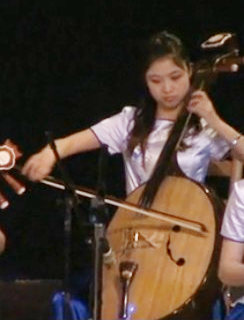
Bowed ruan

In addition to the plucked ruan instruments mentioned above, there also exist a family of bowed string instruments called lāruǎn and dalaruan (literally "bowed ruan" and "large bowed ruan"). Both are bowed bass register instruments designed as alternatives to the gehu and diyingehu in large orchestras of Chinese traditional instruments. These instruments correspond to the cello and double bass in range. Chinese orchestras currently using the laruan and dalaruan include the China National Traditional Orchestra and Central Broadcasting National Orchestra, the latter formerly conducted by the late maestro Peng Xiuwen (彭修文).

== Repertoire ==
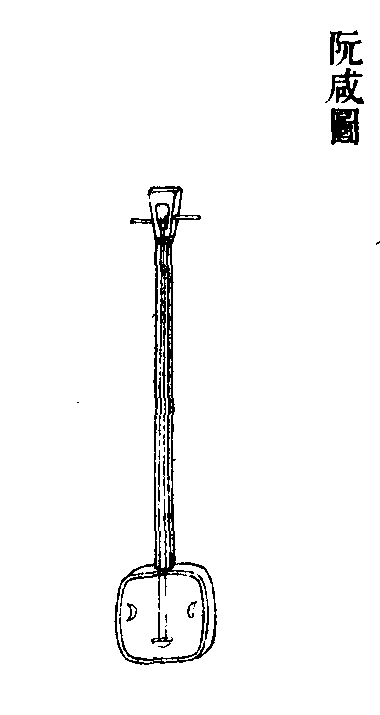
An ancient ruan

A famous work in the zhongruan repertoire is the zhongruan concerto "Reminiscences of Yunnan" (云南回忆) by Liu Xing (刘星, b. China, 1962), the first full-scale concerto for the zhongruan and the Chinese orchestra. This work finally established the zhongruan as an instrument capable of playing solo with the Chinese orchestra.

Some works for the ruan:

- 满江红 Red Fills the River – zhongruan concerto
- 汉琵琶情 Love of the Han Pipa – zhongruan concerto
- 玉关引 Narration of Yuguan – 'ruan quartet
- 山韵 Mountain Tune – zhongruan concerto
- 塞外音诗 Sound Poem Beyond The Great Wall- zhongruan concerto
- 泼水节The Water Festival- ruan Tecerto
- 睡莲 Water Lilies- zhongruan solo
- 火把节之夜 Night of the Torch Festival- zhongruan solo
- 翠华山的传说

Some of Lin Jiliang's compositions for the ruan:

- 石头韵
- 凤凰花开 Flowers Open in Fenghuang Translation from MDBG.net
- 满江红
- 侗歌
- 草原抒怀
- 牧马人之歌
- 石林夜曲

Some of Liu Xing's compositions for the ruan:

- 云南回忆 Reminiscences of Yunnan, zhongruan concerto
- 第二中阮协奏曲 Second Zhongruan Concerto
- 山歌, zhongruan solo
- 月光, zhongruan solo
- 孤芳自赏, zhongruan solo
- 天地之间, zhongruan solo
- 第六号-异想天开, zhongruan duet
- 第七号- 夜长梦多, zhongruan solo
- 第十一号-心不在焉, zhongruan solo
- 流连忘返, zhongruan solo
- 随心所欲, zhongruan solo
- 回心转意, zhongruan solo
- 来日方长, zhongruan solo
- 无所事事, zhongruan solo
- 水到渠成, zhongruan solo
- 心旷神怡, zhongruan solo

Some of Ning Yong's compositions for the ruan:

- 拍鼓翔龙 Flying Dragons in Drum Beats, zhongruan solo (composed with Lin Jiliang)
- 丝路驼铃 Camel Bells on the Silk Road, zhongruan/ daruan solo
- 篮关雪 Snow at Lan Guan, zhongruan solo
- 终南古韵 Ancient Tune of Zhongnan, zhongruan/ daruan solo
- 望秦川 zhongruan solo

== Notable players and composers ==
- Cui Jun Miao (崔军淼)
- Ding Xiaoyan (丁晓燕)
- Fei Jian Rong(费剑蓉)
- Feng Maintain (冯满天)
- Lin Jiliang (林吉良)
- Liu Bo (刘波)
- Liu Xing (刘星)
- Miao Xiaoyun (苗晓芸)
- Ning Yong (宁勇)
- NiNi Music
- Ruan Shi Chun (阮仕春)
- Shen Fei (沈非)
- Su Handa (苏涵达)
- Tan Su-Min, Clara (陈素敏)
- Wang Zhong Bing (王仲丙)
- Wei Wei (魏蔚)
- Wei Yuru (魏育茹)
- Wu Qiang (吴强)
- Xu Yang (徐阳)
- Zhang Rong Hui (张蓉晖)

== Makers ==
=== Beijing ===
- Xinghai (星海)

=== Shanghai ===
- Dunhuang (敦煌)

=== Suzhou ===
- Huqiu (虎丘)

== See also ==
- Zhongruan
- Đàn nguyệt
