= Gehu =

Chinese musical instrument

- Classification: Bowed string instrument

Related instruments
- Huqin

The gehu (Chinese: 革胡; pinyin: géhú) is a Chinese instrument developed in the 20th century by the Chinese musician Yang Yusen (杨雨森, 1926–1980). It is a fusion of the Chinese huqin family and the cello, essentially an erhu cello or Chinese cello. Like standard cellos, its four strings are also tuned (from low to high) C-G-D-A; it also uses standard cello strings. Unlike most other musical instruments in the huqin family, the bridge does not contact the snakeskin drum head, which faces to the side. Instead the bridge is connected to a mechanism inside the body that touches the drum head. The bridge transmits the string vibrations to that mechanism, causing it to vibrate.

There also exists a contrabass gehu that functions as a Chinese double bass, known as the diyingehu, digehu, or beigehu (倍革胡).

By the late 20th century the gehu had become a rare instrument, even within China, as the tendency for the snakeskin to lose its tightness increases with humidity. Today, it is used mostly in Hong Kong and Taiwan, although even there, the cello is beginning to become a popular replacement for it. There are also other Chinese instruments that are able to take on the role of bowed bass range instrument, such as the laruan (which uses the structure and acoustics of the ruan), the lapa (also known as paqin, using the structure of the pipa), and the bass matouqin.

== See also ==
- Dahu
- Dihu
- Chinese music
- List of Chinese musical instruments
- Huqin
