= Laruan =

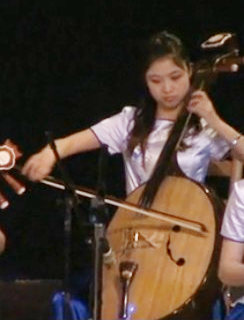
- Classification: Bowed string instrument

Related instruments
- Ruan; Cello

The laruan (Chinese: 拉阮; pinyin: lāruǎn) is a relatively new Chinese string instrument blending the acoustics of the ruan with that of the Western cello. Its larger counterpart is the dalaruan (大拉阮), which corresponds to the double bass. The instrument has a pear-shaped wooden body like ruan, with neck no frets but bowed by horsehair bow

These musical instruments were created in the 20th century to be an alternative to other bowed bass register instruments used in Chinese orchestras, such as dihu, cello/double bass, gehu/diyingehu, damatouqin/dimatouqin, and paqin/dapaqin. The China National Traditional Orchestra of Beijing is one of the few Chinese orchestras using this instrument.

== See also ==
- Ruan
- Gehu
- Dihu
- Traditional Chinese musical instruments
