= Lapa (instrument) =

Wind instrument

The lapa is a wind instrument originating in 19th century China. It is made of metal and shaped like an oboe. The lapa is usually 94 centimeters in length.

== See also ==
- Chinese music
