= Diyingehu =

Modern Chinese bowed string Instrument

Bass gehu
- Classification: Bowed string instrument

Related instruments
- Erhu; Gehu

The bass gehu (Chinese: 低音革胡; pinyin: dīyīn géhú, pronounced [tíín kɤ̌ xǔ]; also called digehu or beigehu 倍革胡, literally "bass gehu") is a Chinese bowed string instrument in the huqin family. It was developed by Yang Yusen along with the gehu in the 20th century. It has four strings and is the Chinese equivalent of the double bass.

== See also ==
- Gehu
- Laruan
- Dihu
- Dahu
- Guqin
- Traditional Chinese musical instruments
- String
