= Dihu =

Chinese bowed string instrument

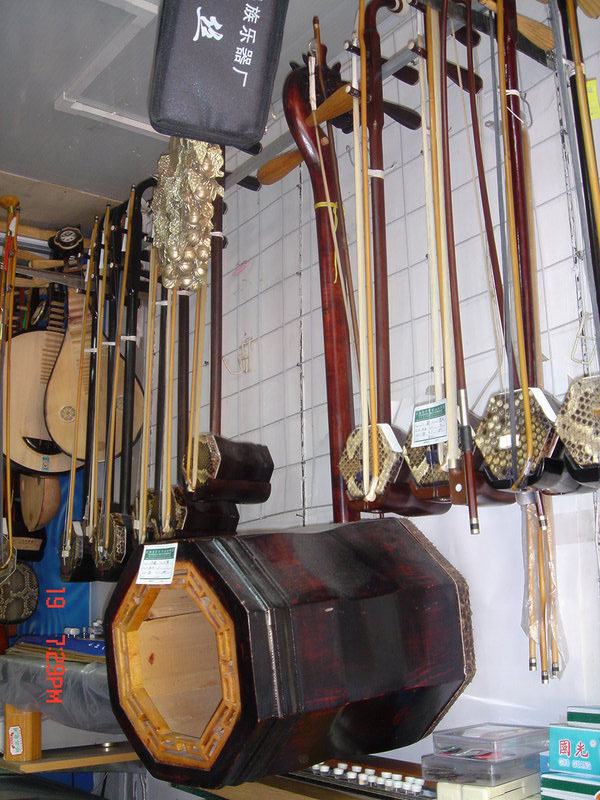
A dadihu (the largest instrument shown), with other Chinese string instruments

The dihu (Chinese: 低胡; pinyin: dīhú) is a large bowed string instrument from China. It has a large soundbox covered on one end with snakeskin. Like most other members of the huqin family of instruments, it has two strings and is held vertically. The instrument's name derives from "dī," meaning "low," and "hú" (short for huqin).

== Sizes ==
The instrument comes in three sizes:

- The xiaodihu (小低胡, also called dahu or cizhonghu), pitched one octave below the erhu (tuned D-A, with its lowest D one whole step above the viola's lowest C). It is the tenor member of the erhu family (the erhu being the soprano member and the zhonghu being the alto member).
- The zhongdihu (中低胡, pitched one octave below the zhonghu, (tuned G-D, as the middle strings of the cello). It is the bass member of the erhu family.
- The dadihu (大低胡, pitched one octave below the xiaodihu and two octaves below the erhu (tuned D-A, with its lowest D one whole step above the cello's lowest C). It is the contrabass member of the erhu family.

== Overview ==
The dihu family was developed for orchestral use in the 1930s as lower members of the erhu family (the erhu being the soprano member and the zhonghu being the alto member) to increase the pitch range of the instruments used in a Chinese orchestra and allow music with harmony to be played. However, by the late 20th century it had largely fallen into disuse, part of the reason being that it is unwieldy to play. Also, the fact that (like other instruments in the huqin family) the bow passes between the instrument's two strings means that playing pizzicato is difficult; thus, the larger four-string gehu and diyingehu (or cello or double bass) are generally used in Chinese orchestras for the lower bowed string voices instead.

== See also ==
- Dahu (instrument)
- Diyingehu
- Laruan
- Huqin
- Traditional Chinese musical instruments
