= Bowed string instrument =

String instrument played by a bow rubbing the strings

Bowed string instruments are a subcategory of string instruments that are played by a bow rubbing the strings. The bow rubbing the string causes vibration which the instrument emits as sound.

Despite the numerous specialist studies devoted to the origin of bowing, the origin of bowing remains unknown.

== List of bowed string instruments ==
=== Violin family ===
- Cello (violoncello)
- Pochette
- Viola (altviol, bratsche)
- Violin (violino)
- Double bass (contrabasso)

Variants on the standard members of the violin family include

- Baroque violin
- Cello da spalla
- Five string violin
- Hardanger fiddle
- Kit violin
- Kontra
- Låtfiol
- Lira da braccio
- Octobass
- Sardino
- Stroh violin
- Tenor violin
Instruments of Violin family
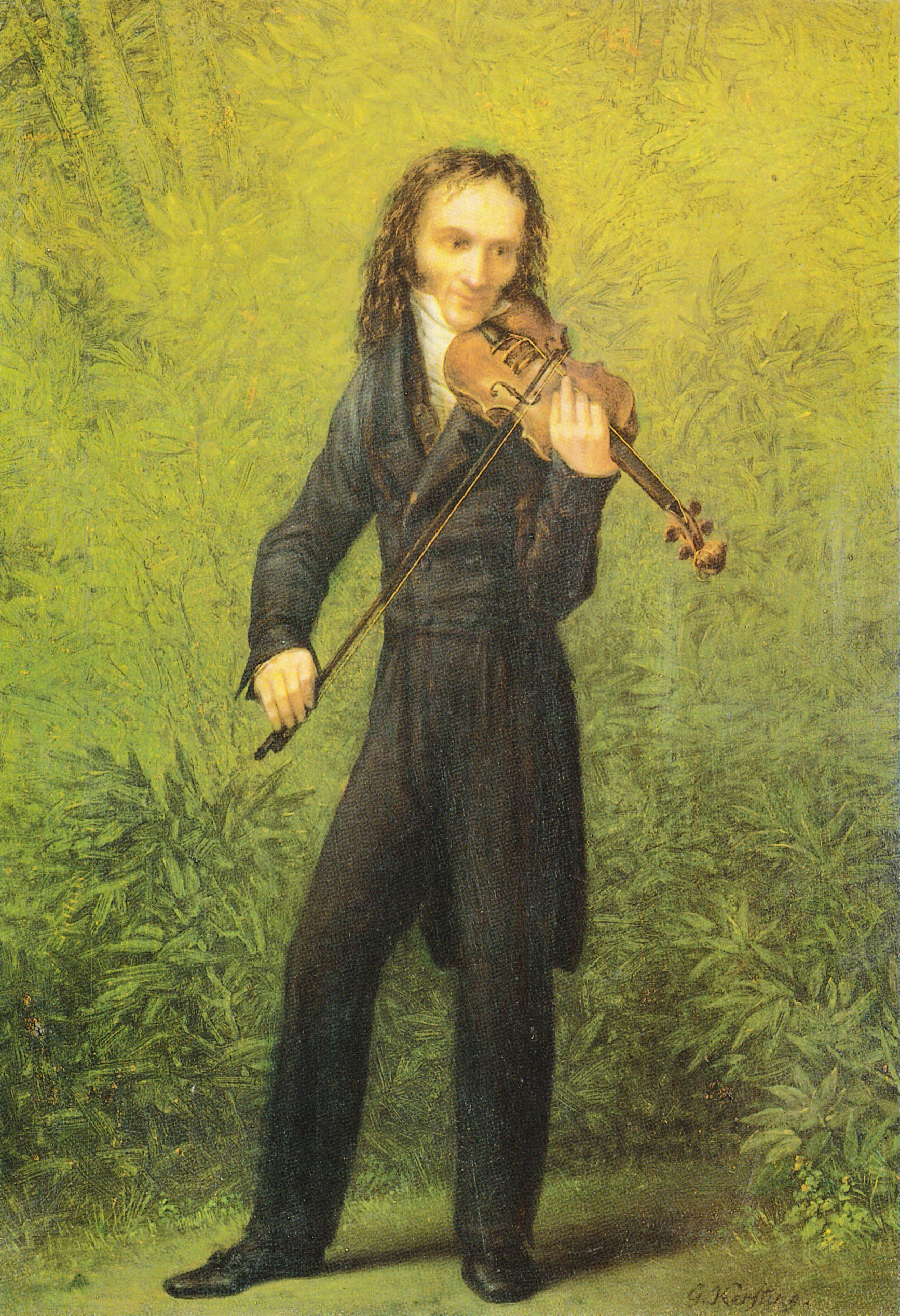
Niccolò Paganini playing the violin, by Georg Friedrich Kersting (1785–1847)

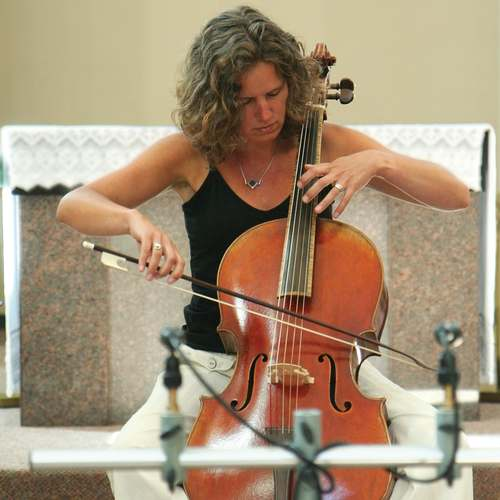
Josephine van Lier plays a violoncello piccolo, a five-string variant of the Baroque cello, during a recording session of Bach's 6th Cello Suite.

=== Viol family (Viola da Gamba family) ===
- Alto viol (alto viola da gamba)
- Bass viol (bass viola da gamba)
- Tenor viol (tenor viola da gamba)
- Treble viol (treble viola da gamba)

Variants on the standard four members of the viol family include

- Baryton
- Division viol
- Lirone
- Lyra viol
- Pardessus de viol
- Vihuela de arco
- Violone
- Viola d'amore
Instruments of Viol family
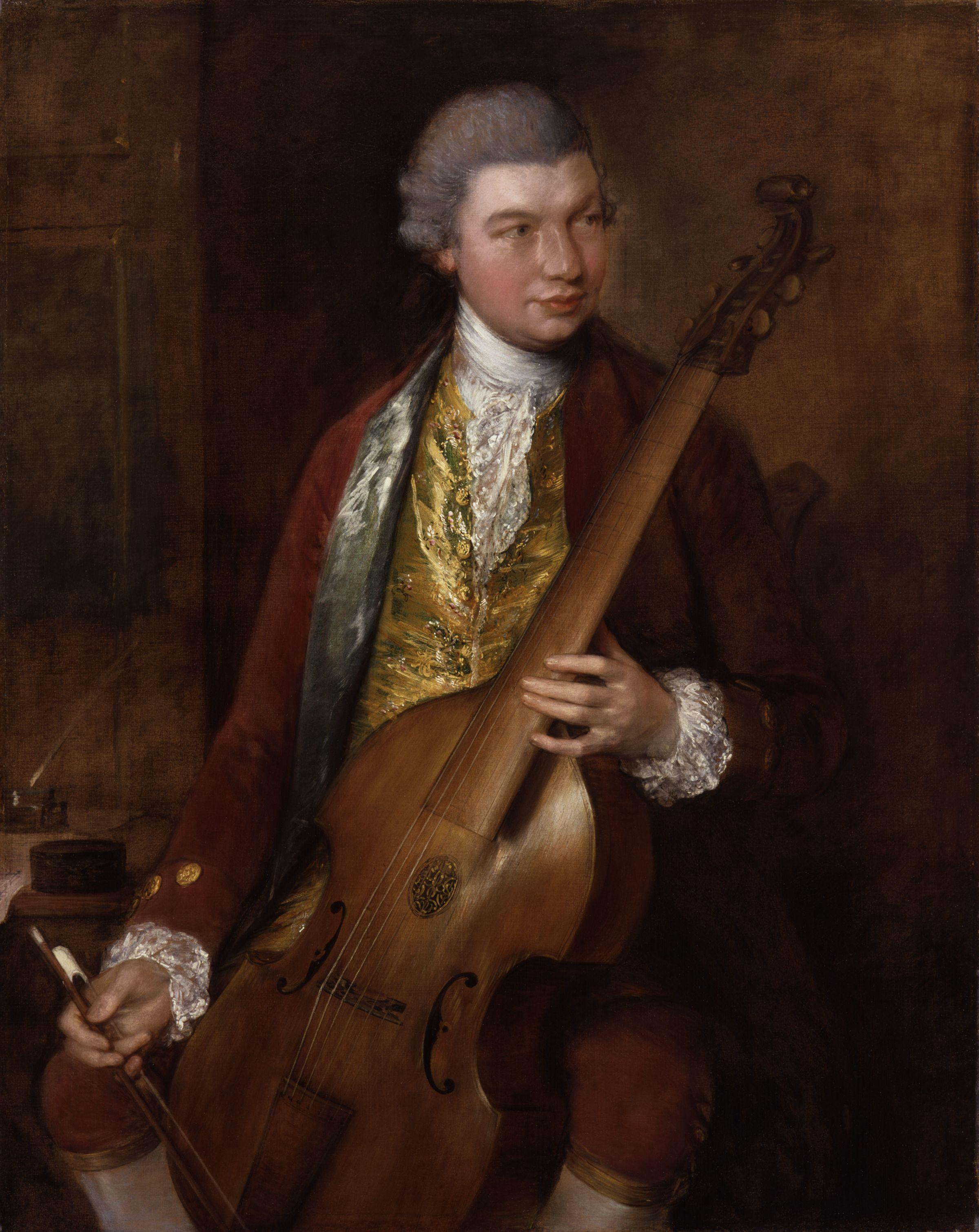
Karl Friedrich Abel playing the bass Viola da Gamba, by Thomas Gainsborough (1727–1788)

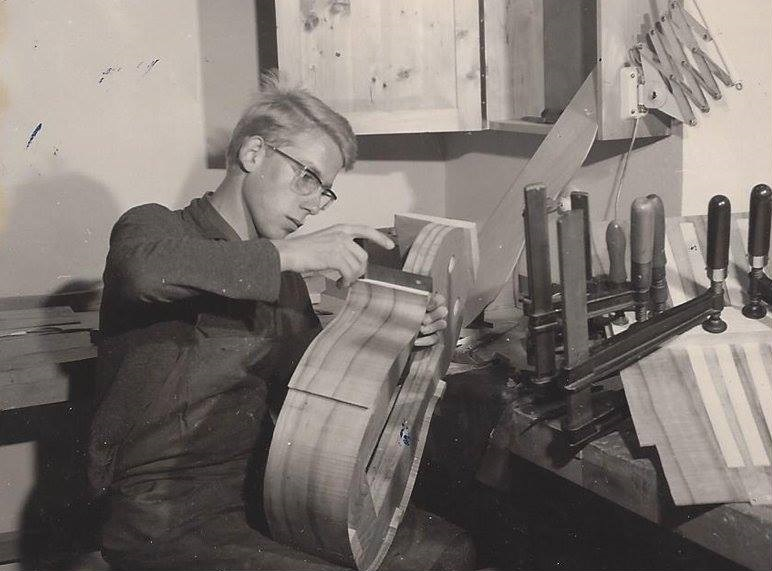
Violinmaker Hans Benning of Benning Violins creating a Baryton in Los Angeles, 1963.

=== Lyra and rebec type ===
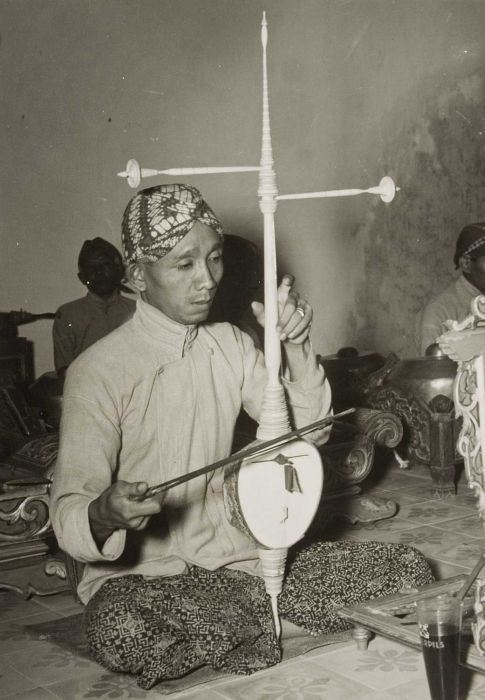
An Indonesian music performer playing with his Rebab.

- Byzantine lyra
- Calabrian lira
- Cretan lyra
- Gadulka
- Ghaychak
- Kamancheh
- Kemençe of the Black Sea
- Kemenche
- Kemenche (classical)
- Lijerica
- Pochette
- Rabeca
- Rebab
- Rebec
- Shah Kaman

=== Chinese bowed instruments ===
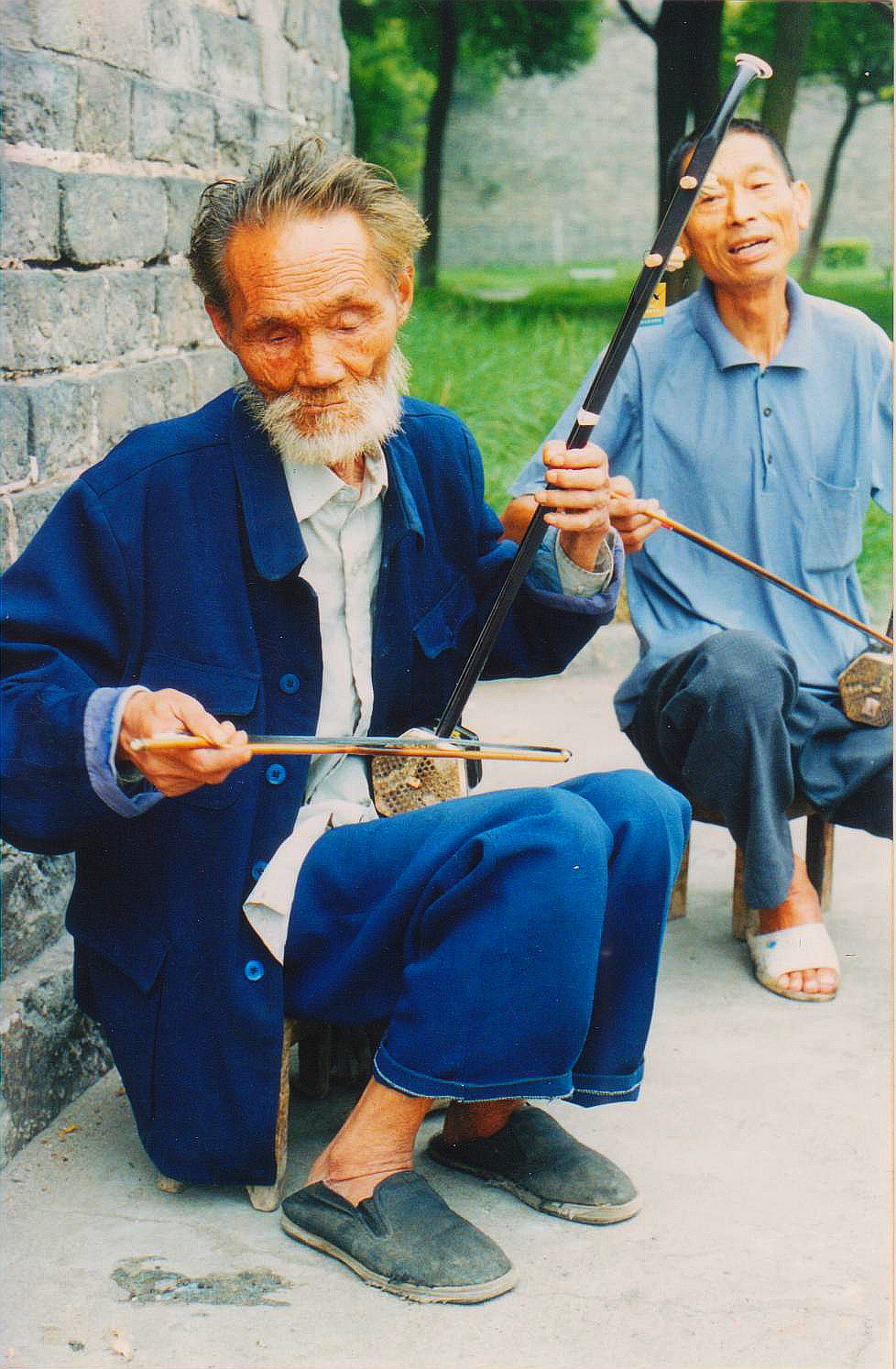
Two performers playing the Erhu, sometimes known as the Chinese fiddle.

- Banhu
- Daguangxian
- Dahu
- Dihu
- Diyingehu
- Erhu
- Erxian
- Gaohu
- Gehu
- Huqin
- Jiaohu
- Jinghu
- Jing erhu
- Laruan
- Leiqin
- Maguhu
- Matouqin
- Sanhu
- Sihu
- Tiqin
- Tihu
- Tuhu
- Wenzhenqin
- Xiqin
- Yazheng
- Yehu
- Zhengni
- Zhonghu
- Zhuiqin
- Zhuihu

=== Rosined wheel instruments ===
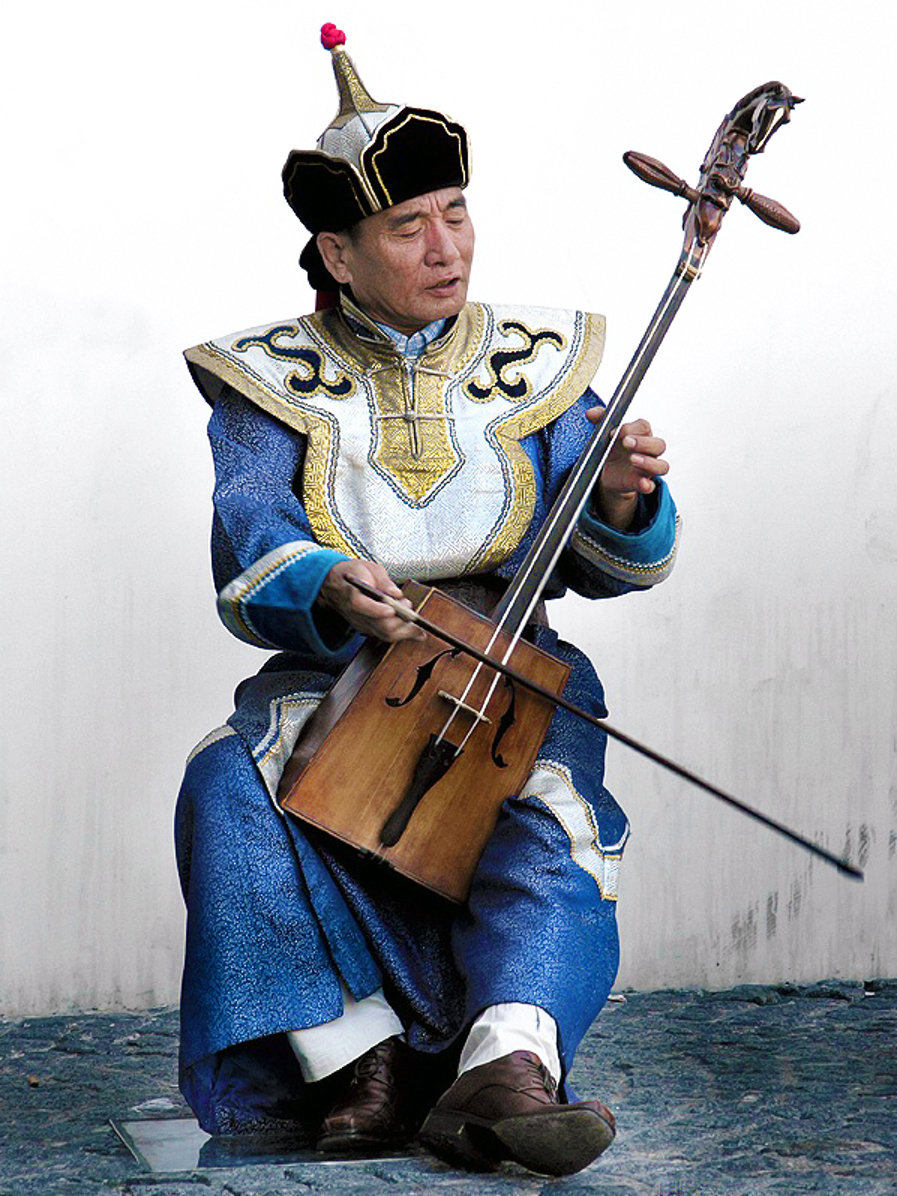
A performer playing the Morin Khuur, the Mongolian Horse Fiddle

The following instruments are sounded by means of a turning wheel that acts as the bow:

- Bowed clavier
- Donskoy ryley
- Dulcigurdy a.k.a. Vielle à roue et à manche
- Drejelire
- Harmonichord
- Hurdy-gurdy
- Kaisatsuko
- Lira
- Ninera
- Organistrum
- Tekerő
- Viola organista
- Violano Virtuoso
- Wheelharp

=== Other bowed instruments ===
- Agiarut
- Ajaeng
- Arpeggione
- Bowed dulcimer
- Bowed guitar
- Bowed psaltery
- Byzaanchy
- Chuurqin
- Crwth
- Đàn nhị
- Đàn hồ
- Đàn gáo
- Daxophone
- Esraj
- Fiðla
- Gadulka
- Ghaychak
- Giga
- Gudok
- Gue
- Gusle
- Haegeum
- Huqin
- Igil
- Imzad
- Jouhikko
- Kingri
- Kokyū
- Kobyz
- Masenqo
- Morin khuur
- Musical saw
- Neola
- Nyckelharpa (Swedish keyed fiddle)
- Ravanahatha
- Salo
- Sarangi
- Sarangi (Nepali)
- Sarinda
- Saw duang
- Saw sam sai
- Saw u
- Shichepshin
- Sohaegeum
- Sorahi
- Sorud
- Talharpa
- Tautirut
- Tro sau thom
- Tro Khmer
- Tro sau toch
- Tro u
- Umbang
- Vielle
- Violoncello da spalla
- Yaylı tambur

== See also ==
- Bow stroke
