= Music of southern China =

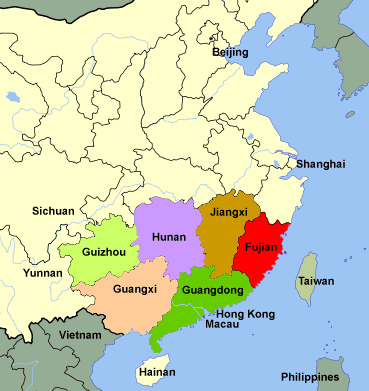

The music of the southern China has many features that are distinct from the rest of the country. For instance, many folk songs only use three notes. The region is home to significant populations of ethnic minorities, such as the Zhuang, Miao, She and Tai peoples.

Lingnan (嶺南) is a generic term for the lands of southern China that covers Guangdong, Guangxi, Hunan and Jiangxi. The area, motherland of ancient Nanyue, was inhabited by the Baiyue, considered barbarians having loose contact with the Zhongyuan region, the centre of Chinese culture. In the 2nd century BC, the region was absorbed into the Middle Kingdom.

== Fujian ==
Fujian (福建) is a mountainous coastal province of China. Its provincial capital is Fuzhou, while Quanzhou was a major port in the 7th century CE, the period between the Sui and Tang eras. Situated upon an important maritime trade route, it was a conduit for elements of distant cultures. The result was what is now known as nanguan music, which today preserves many archaic features.

From the 17th century the Hoklo immigrated from Fujian to Taiwan and took with them informal folk music as well as more ritualized instrumental and operatic forms taught in amateur clubs, such as beiguan and nanguan. Large populations of similar background can also be found in Malaysia, Guangdong, Hong Kong, Philippines, Singapore, Burma, Thailand and Indonesia, where they are usually referred to as Hokkien ("Fujian" in Min Nan Chinese). There are two nanguan associations in Singapore, and formerly there were several in the Philippines: Tiong-Ho Long-Kun-sia is one that is still active. Gang-a-tsui and Han-Tang Yuefu have popularised the nanguan ensemble abroad. A Quanzhou Nanguan Music Ensemble was founded in the early 1960s and there is a Fuzhou Folk Music Ensemble, founded in 1990.

Shifan （十番）is a kind of percussive music that accompanied the Dragon Lantern Dance. A troupe from Fujian is known to have performed the dance for an emperor of the Qing dynasty. Over time string and wind instruments have been added.

Chanhe （禪和）arose out of the Chanhe School of Buddhism from chanting accompanied by percussion instruments such as chimes and drums. In the early 1920s, wind and string instruments were added.

== Guangdong ==
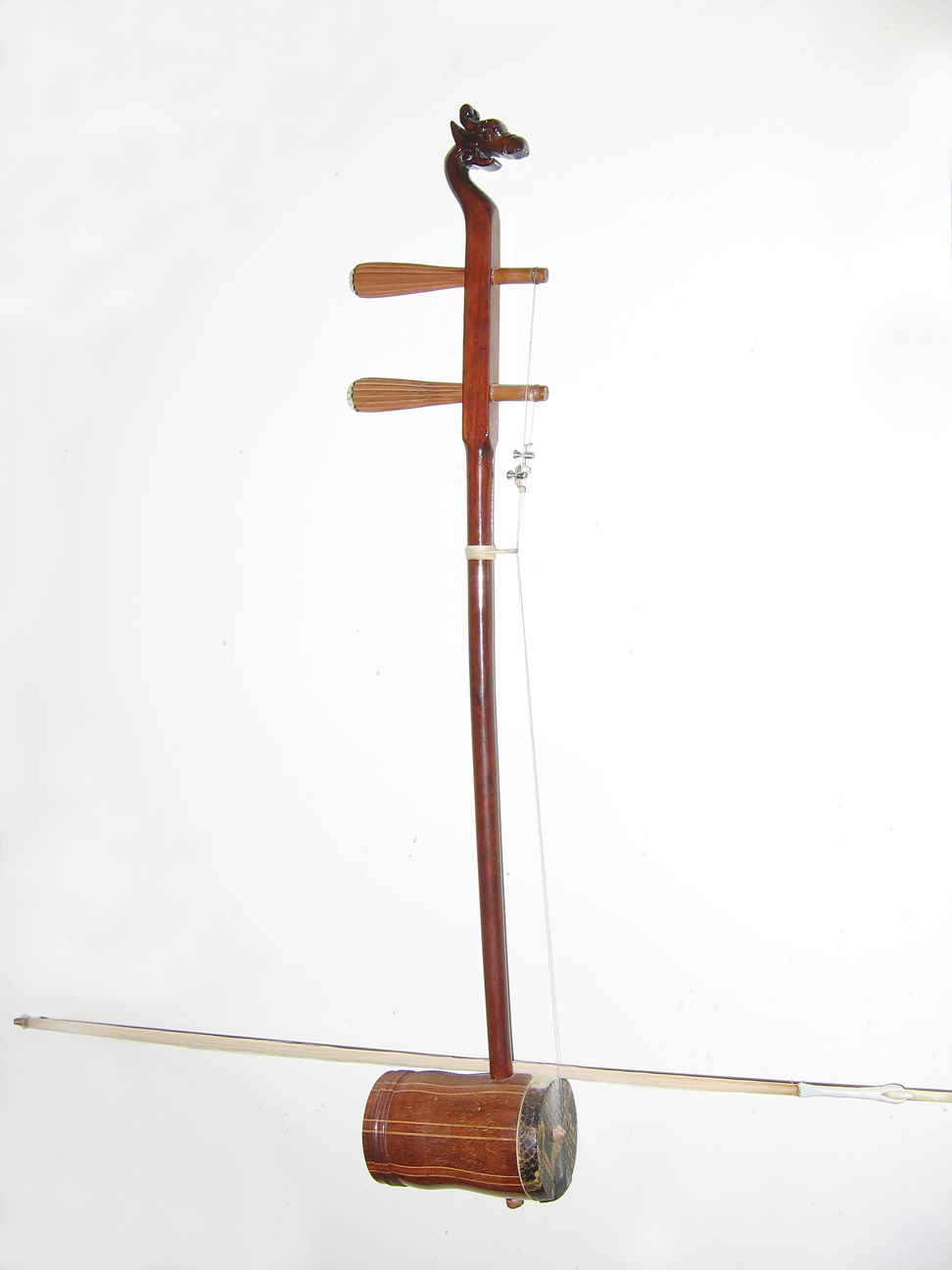
The Gaohu of Guangdong: invented in the early 20th century it became the typical bowed instrument of Cantonese music.

Guangdong xiaoqu is the sizhu (chamber music) tradition native to the Pearl River delta area centered in Guangzhou (Canton). In modern times Guangdong has become known for Guangdong music (later Guangdong folk tunes), a synthesis of a number of local folk music styles (like kunqu opera), intended as an accompaniment for the region's folk operas when it arose along the Pearl River Delta in the 1920s. It had evolved into a string ensemble format by the 1960s, led by the gaohu with ruan, qinqin, yangqin, sanxian, yehu, and various woodwind (including houguan or saxophone) and percussion instruments. Formerly, bowed stringed instruments such as the erxian and tiqin were used. Compositions by the noted gaohu player Lü Wencheng (吕文成, 1898–1981) remain particularly popular.

Chaozhou (also known as Teochew) music (潮州音乐) includes Teochew string music (潮州弦诗), Teochew gong and drum (潮州大锣鼓), and Chaoyang flute music (潮阳笛套). The Chaozhou guzheng (潮州古筝) is regarded as a major member of the southern guzheng family.

Hakka hill songs (Chinese: 客家山歌; pinyin: Kèjiā shāngē Hakka pronunciation: [hak˥ka˦ san˦kɔ˦]) are a type of shan'ge (山歌), "mountain song" characteristic of the Guangdong region. They vary in theme from love to personal conduct. Said to have been used for courting, they are also used as a form of communication at a distance. Hakka hill songs can be made up impromptu, to communicate with others or to express oneself. The lyrics can also be made to contain puzzles as a game or competition. The challenger will answer the puzzle in the form of song of similar melody.

== Guangxi ==
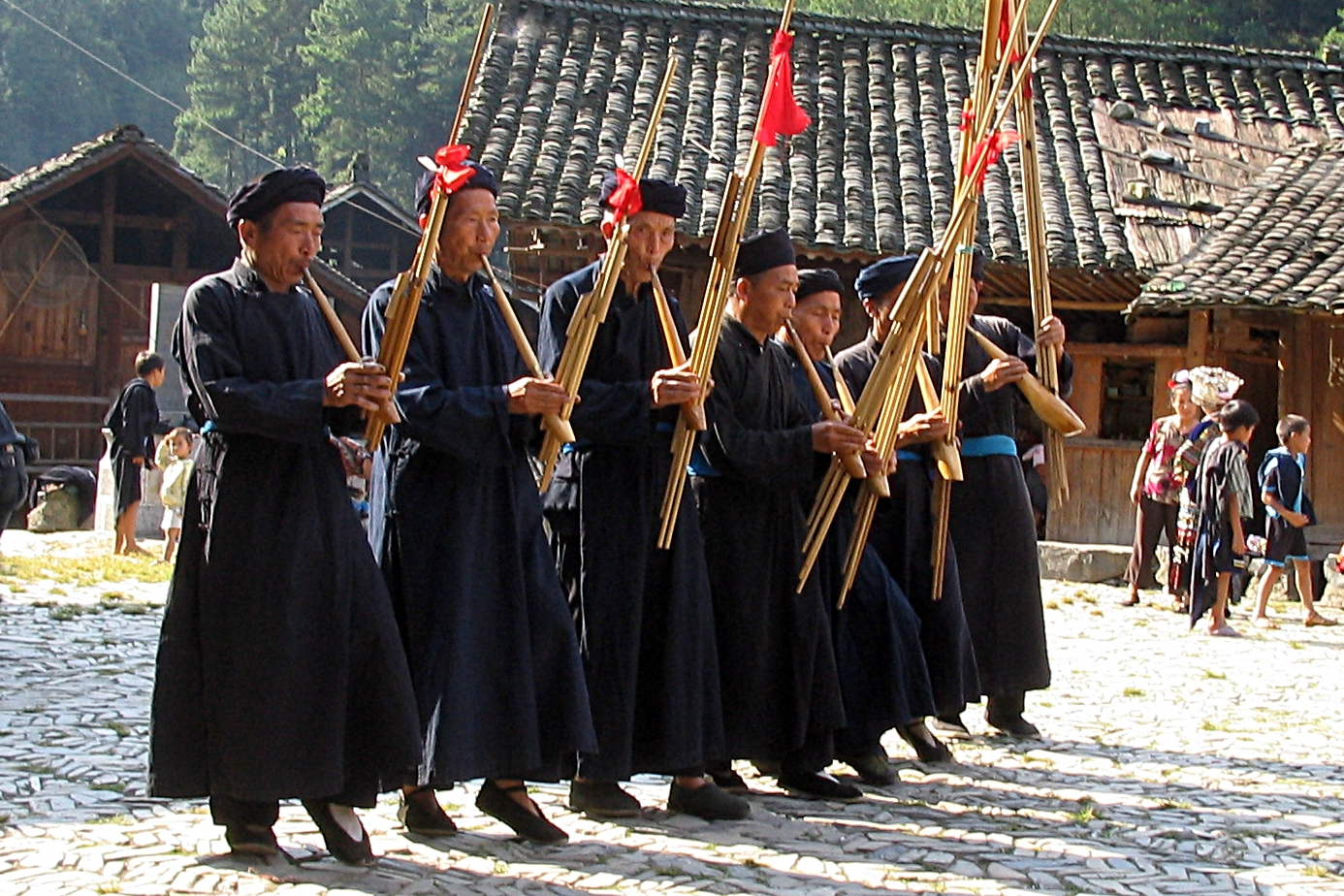
Miao musicians of Guizhou

The Gin people are known for their instrument called duxianqin (独弦琴, pinyin: dúxiánqín; lit. "single string zither"), a string instrument with only one string, said to date back to the 8th century. It is called đàn bầu in Vietnamese.

The Zhuang people are known for their bayin (八 音) instrumental ensemble, which includes such instruments as the maguhu, tuhu, huluhu, sanxian, drums, and cymbals, as well as other instruments.

The Guangxi Zhuang Autonomous Region's most famous modern musician is Sister Liu, who was the subject of a 1960s film that introduced Guangxi's cultures to the rest of the world.

== Guizhou ==
Guizhou's folk tradition includes the song "Red Flower", which spread across China in the 1950s. The song came from the Buyi people. The Shui people use instruments like the lusheng, bronze drums and horns.

== Hakka ==
The music of the Hakka peoples is found in Jiangxi, Fujian and Guangdong. Hakka music is literary and laid-back in tone and is entirely pentatonic.

== Art music in southern China ==
While nanguan is melodic and soft, Beiguan (北 管; pinyin: Běiguǎn; Taiwanese: Pakkóan, meaning "northern pipes") is loud, complex and associated with theatrical performance. Although its name sets it in opposition to the "southern" style of nanguan, the other main style associated with the quguan associations, it was widespread in Zhangzhou (the southern part of Fujian) and in Taiwan between the 17th and mid-20th centuries. By the early 21st century its popularity had declined. Formerly it was used when musical associations put on events for one another. Beiguan usually uses two Chinese oboes (suona) together with percussion; the woodblock (bangzi), large and small gongs (da luo and xiao luo), large and small cymbals (da bo and xiao bo) and drums, the ban gu (high-pitched drum), the tong gu (small drum) and sometimes the da gu (large drum). It may also use various huqin and plucked instruments.

The Chaoshan region of Guangdong, bordering on Fujian and comprising the cities of Chaozhou, Shantou and Jieyang, forms its own cultural sphere. Chaozhou xianshi (潮州 弦诗, literally "Chaozhou string-poem"; also called xianshi yue or "string-poem music") is classified as a type of sizhu music (chamber music for strings and woodwind, literally "silk/bamboo") although it typically uses stringed instruments only. It is found in northeastern Guangdong and parts of Fujian and also in regions with overseas Chaozhou populations, such as Singapore, Thailand, and the United States. In teahouses tea is often accompanied by Chaozhou music.

Developed from a fusion of elements, popular song, arias of Chinese opera, ancient melodies and pieces of Buddhist music, Xianshi music falls into two styles: Rujia yue is music of the Confucian school that can be performed as an independent instrumental music genre or at weddings and other ceremonies and that aims at elegance and nobility, while Pengding yue is principally the music of the theatre, though it may be played independently: it cultivates a sober, rustic style.

The instruments most commonly employed include several varieties of two-stringed bowed lutes; the zixian (二弦) erxian or touxian ((头弦) the lead instrument in the Kejia style, shorter and higher-pitched than the erxian), the tihu (of lower pitch than the zixian, adapted from the Cantonese gaohu) and the big and small yehu (coconut shell body), as well as several types of plucked lutes; the pipa, big and small sanxian (a fretless bass instrument like the shamisen), qinqin (four-stringed with short, fretted neck and round body), ruan (four-stringed with long, fretted neck and round body) and meihuaqin. Other than this, the zhen (zither) and yangqin (a hammered dulcimer thought to derive from the Iranian santur) are played as well as percussion instruments, a hand-held wooden clapper (muban), a pair of "temple" blocks (daban and fuban) that mark the beat and a small drum (zhegu).

The ten characteristic compositions of Xianshi yue are

- Zhaojun yuan (Grief of Wang Zhaojun),
- Xiaotaohong
- Hanya xishui (Jackdaws Play in the Water),
- Huangli ci (The Oriole's Cry),
- Yue'er gao (High Moon),
- Dababan
- Pingsha luoyan (Flock of Geese on the Shore),
- Fengqiuhuang (The Male Phoenix Seeks the Female),
- Wulianhuan (Five Knots of the Chain)
- Jinshang tianhua (Adding Flowers upon Brocade).

The form of each of these pieces resembles a suite (taoqu) of variations upon a stock melody (qupai or "noted tune"). These are called ban or "beat" variations and follow an ordered sequence with changes of tempo and measure (most pieces have six or eight beat measures). Augmentation and diminution of the melody is used, so that it may repeatedly double in speed through the variations. The technique of cui introduces a division-like filling in of the melody with figures such as repeated notes and neighbouring or passing notes. Perfect-fourth transposition of the melody (fan) also occurs, though the tonal centre remains constant.

Four or five main modes (diao) are traditionally identified. However, while elsewhere in China such modes are mainly defined by absolute pitch and by the degree of the pentatonic scale that is taken as the key-note (thus setting the intervals of the scale), the xianshi conception of mode, rather like the Indian raga system, includes motif, ornament and intonation. Pitch is not absolute but the scale is usually constructed on a key-note approximating to western concert F – F#. Modes are pentatonic but all derive from a seven-note scale: no notice is taken of the starting and finishing tones of the melody in determining the mode and the key-note remains the same in every mode. Tunes may be adapted to a new mode, but the mode remains constant throughout any performance of the suite.

Apart from the major pentatonic scale two further tones, corresponding to a (sharp) perfect fourth and a (flat) major seventh, are employed. The "missing" steps of the scale in each mode may be used in ornament but are not part of main mode structure. The mode qingsan qingliu ("Light III Light VI") is the standard major pentatonic. But qingsan zhongliu ("Light III Heavy VI") calls for a heavy string-pressure upon the sixth degree, raising it to the seventh. Zhongsan zhongliu ("Heavy III Heavy VI"), similarly, applies this upward string-bend to the third degree as well, raising it to the fourth. The fourth common scale, called Huowu ("Live V"), resembles this last but avoids the plain third degree and instead uses a heavy vibrato on the second degree. This is said to be the most characteristic mode of the region.

Chaozhou drum music includes the big drum and gong, the small drum and gong, the dizi set drum and dong and su drum and gong ensembles. The current Chaozhou drum music is said to be similar to the form of the Drum and Wind Music of the Han and Tang Dynasties.

The Chaozhou guzheng (潮州古筝) is also regarded as a major member of the southern guzheng family.

== Opera in southern China ==
Jiangxi's opera heritage played a major role in the evolution of Beijing opera.

Cantonese opera is the operatic style of Guangdong, but Chaozhou opera (潮劇), which has a history of more than 500 years, based on local folk dances and ballads, formed its own style under the influence of Nanxi Opera, a style that originated during the Song dynasty. Its tunes are graceful and pleasant, full of local color. The old form of choral accompaniment still remains a special feature. Clowns and females are the most distinctive characters in a Chaozhou opera, and fan-playing and acrobatic skills are more prominent than in other types of performances.

Guiju (桂剧), an indigenous form of opera from Guangxi, is most popular in the northern and eastern parts of the province, particularly around the city of Guilin, for which the genre is named. It is similar to Beijing opera but is sung in the Guilin dialect of Chinese.

== Music events in southern China ==
There is a Music and Dance Festival of Fujian Province, a Baihua Arts and Cultural Festival of Fuzhou Municipality. The cities of Xiamen and Quanzhou have applied to UNESCO for recognition as masterpieces of the oral and intangible heritage of humanity. Musical institutions in Guangdong include the Guangdong International Summer Music Festival.

== See also ==
- Huluhu
- Maguhu
- Tuhu
