= Liu Mingyuan =

Liu Mingyuan (刘明源, pinyin: Líu Míngyuán; 1931-1996) was a prominent Chinese musician, composer, and teacher. He played the Chinese bowed string instruments banhu, zhonghu, gaohu, erhu, jinghu, and zhuihu, among others, as well as the piano.

== Biography ==
Born in Tianjin, Mingyuan began studying music from his father and eventually learned to play a wide variety of traditional genres including pingju, Cantonese music, and Beijing opera.

He composed and arranged several popular guoyue pieces, many of which are based on traditional Chinese melodies. Among his best-known compositions are Xi Yang Yang (喜洋洋), Happy Year (幸福年), and Ten Elder Sisters (十大姐). Among his solos for the erhu are Henan Tune (河南小曲).

Along with Liu Tianhua and Abing, Liu is considered one of China's three finest traditional instrumentalists of the 20th century.
