= Music of Guangxi =

The most famous performer of the music of Guangxi is the legendary Zhuang folksinger, 刘三姐 (pinyin: liú sān jiě) or Third Sister Liu, born in Guangxi during the Southern Song Dynasty (1127-1279) and who was the subject of the 1961 film, Liu Sanjie which introduced Guangxi's culture to the rest of the world.

The Gin people are known for their instrument called Duxianqin (Gin language: độc huyền cầm, chữ Hán: 独弦琴; Chinese: 独弦琴, pinyin: dúxiánqín; lit. "single string zither"), a string instrument with only one string, said to date back to the 8th century. It is called đàn bầu in Vietnamese.

The Zhuang people are known for their bayin (八音) instrumental ensemble, which includes such instruments as the maguhu, tuhu, huluhu, sanxian, drums, and cymbals, as well as other instruments.

Guiju (桂剧), an indigenous form of opera from Guangxi, is most popular in the northern and eastern parts of the province, particularly around the city of Guilin, for which the genre is named. It is similar to Beijing opera but is sung in the Guilin dialect of Chinese.

== See also ==
- Huluhu
- Maguhu
- Tuhu
