= Stringed music in China =

Stringed music is prominent in China, especially in the Jiangnan region, where it is the name of all the instruments made from wood and string. This form of performance started from the Jin dynasty (266–420).

The most common Chinese stringed instruments are the guqin, zheng, erhu, and pipa. These instruments were developed over thousands of years.

== Instruments ==
=== Guqin ===
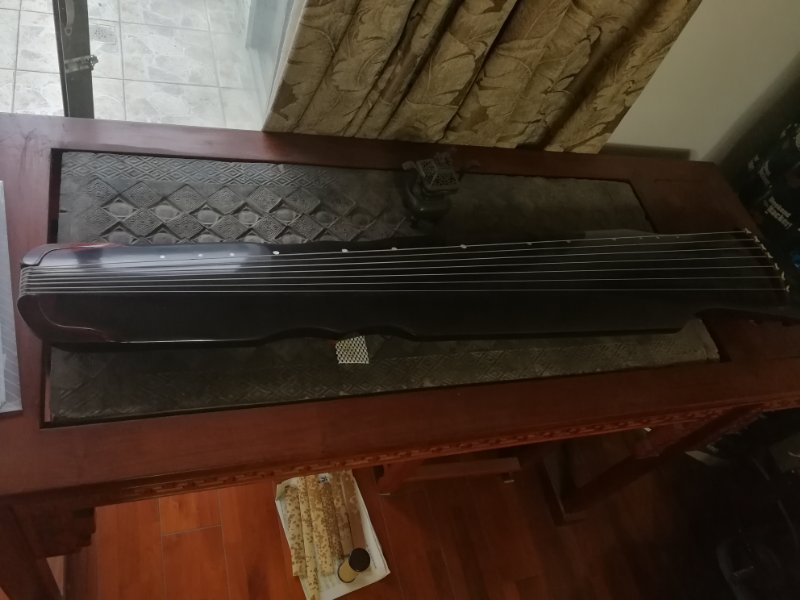
Guqin

Guqin is commonly made of paulownia wood, which makes the guqin lighter and its tone sweeter than other woods. In the past, rich families and royalties preferred to use rare woods to make the guqin, such as nanmu, Pterocarpus santalinus, or mahogany

=== Erhu ===
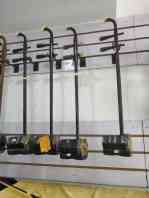
Erhu

Erhu first appeared during the Tang dynasty. At the beginning, erhu were called huqin since they were invented by an ethnic group that lived in northern China. Their original role was for soldiers in frontier regions. Its timbre is strong, and songs for erhu always describe wars, desert, and for people far from home to tell their how much they miss their families.

Erhu have two strings. Modern instruments use more durable metal strings, rather than silk.

=== Pipa ===
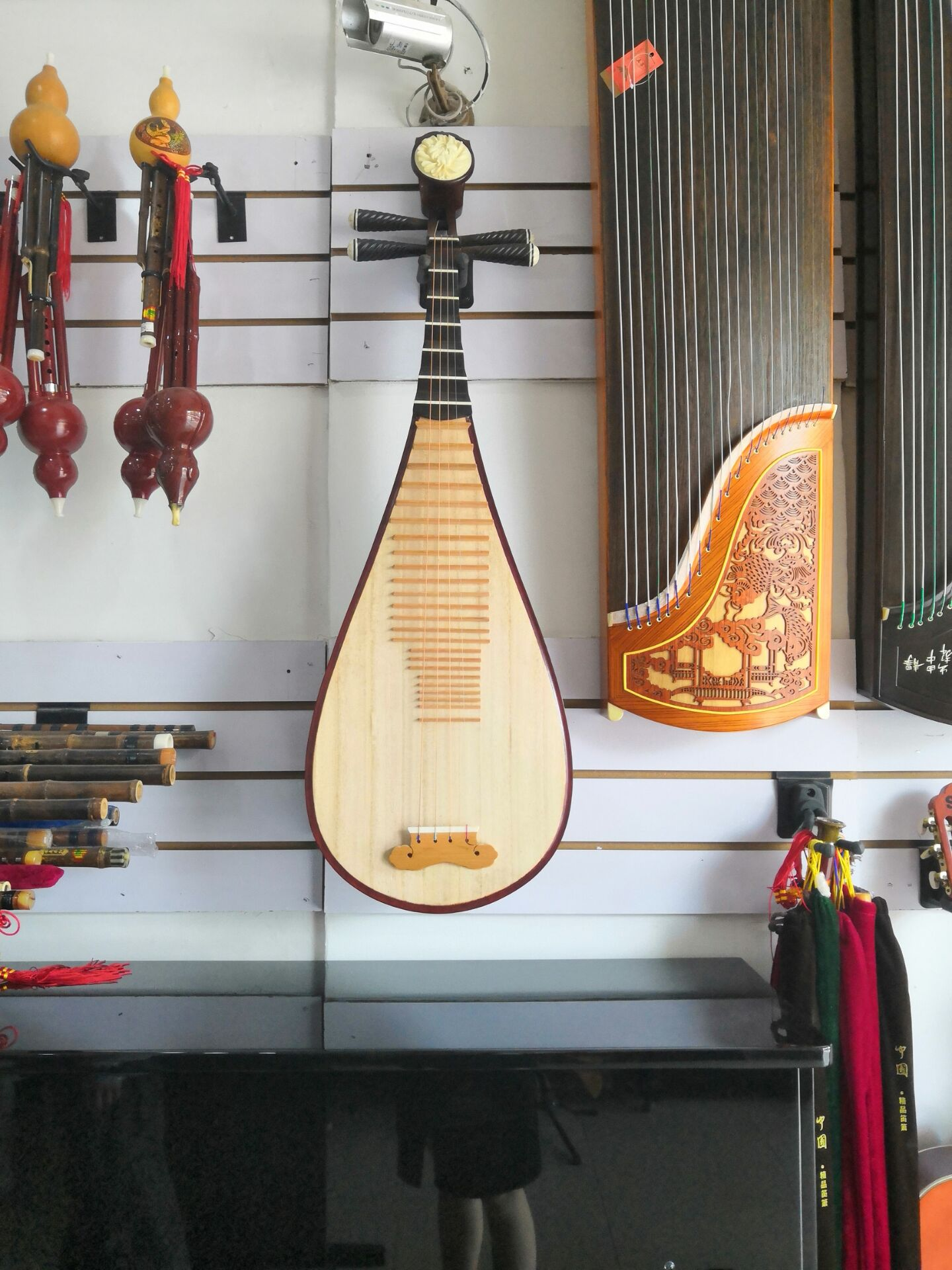
Pipa

This instrument appeared two thousand years Pipa is a general name. Playing the instruments with the hand forward or backward controls whether the sound is pi or pa.

In Tang dynasty, pipa was popular in the palace. Emperors as well as ordinary families all played pipa in daily life. Many paintings of that time show the pipa. Pipa is mainly still played today.

=== Zheng ===
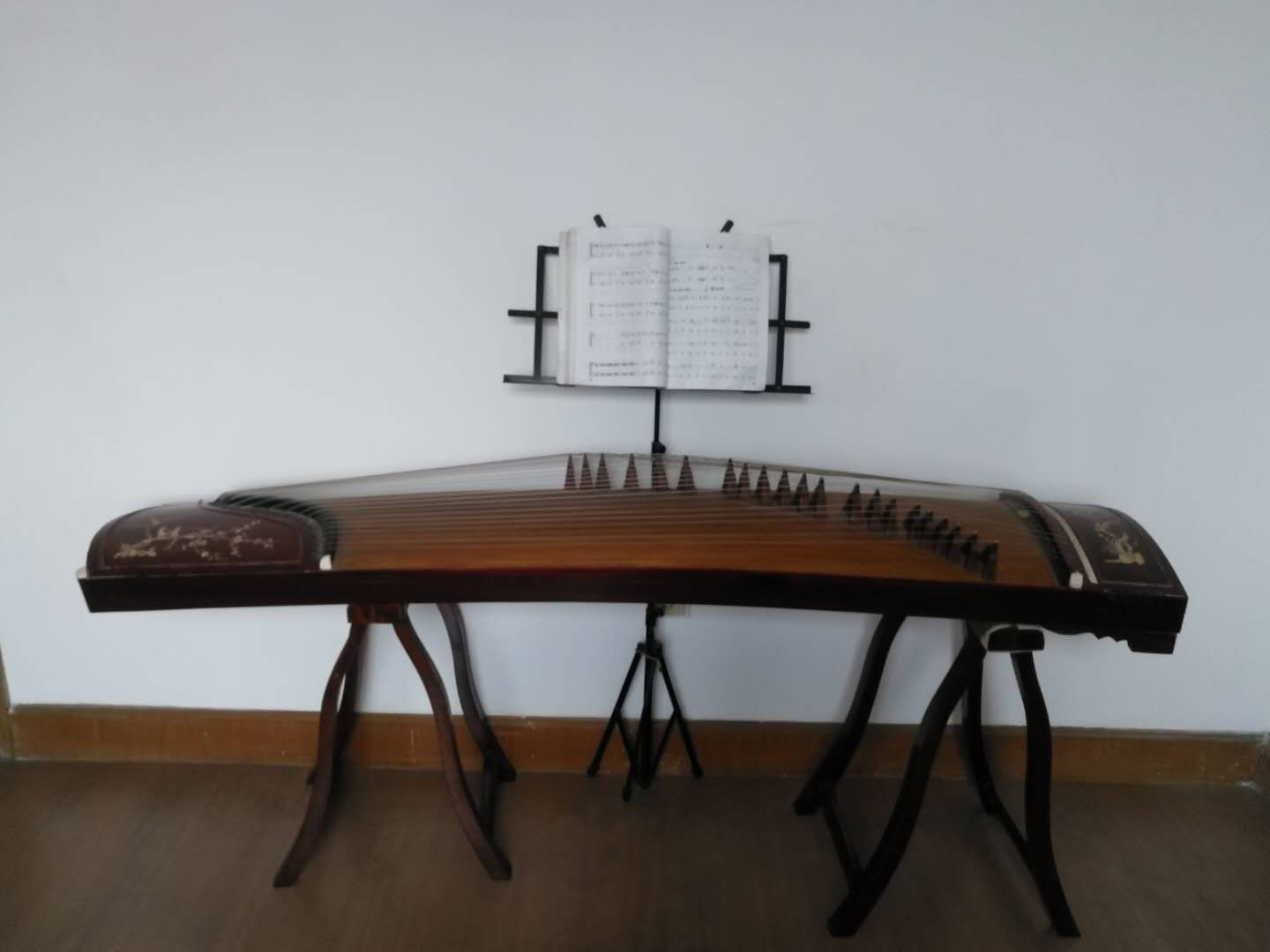
This is zheng.

Zheng have 21 strings (in contrast to guqin, which have seven). Accordingly, the zheng is louder and suitable for performing to groups of people.

Zheng have a 2,500 year history, beginning in the Qin dynasty. In the 19th century, its performance became popular and was learned by many people, who developed new ways to perform. In the 21st century performances of Guzheng became popular in many countries.

The materials of Zheng have a standard:

- Length : 1.63 m
- Strings: 21 - originally 12, 13, 18, 23 or 25
- Wood: Paulownia
- String material: traditionally, horse tail

== Strings ==
In the past the raw material came from animals that had been specially fed. The most common material was silk, explaining why string music was mostly developed by rich families or the palace. Silk strings were not durable, therefore ordinary families could not afford the expense of replacing them.

Silk strings are made by tightly twisting silk threads together. The strings are soaked in a kind of natural glue and dried.

More recently nylon-flatwound steel strings were developed. These strings have a longer durability, and are popular for their louder tone, low cost, and the scarcity of high quality silk strings. Although most players start out using nylon strings, traditional silk strings have better tone. Also, the sound of fingers sliding over the strings is valued, but nylon strings sound different.

== History ==
The string music of Jiangnan reached Jiangsu, Zhejiang and Shanghai. The musical instruments involved are small, light and elegant. With unique, and colorful acoustic effects, they represent the culture of Jiangnan. Eventually, the music was officially given the name "Jiangnan Silk Bamboo". Folk music and ancient music were adapted to Jiangnan string music by generations of silk and bamboo masters, gradually forming its characteristics. Jiangnan string music was fully formed by the late Qing Dynasty, and flourished during the Republic of China.

Jiangnan string music was once known as "South Jiangsu silk bamboo" and "Wuyue silk bamboo" due to its regional and customary style.

String music developed greatly in northern China. The northern region was where Erhu and Pipa were invented. Since string music in the past was more frequently performed in the palace, many of the outstanding musical compositions spread from the north.

== Masterpieces of Chinese string music ==
二泉映月; Er Quan Yin Yue

高山流水; Gao Shan Liu Shui

梅花三弄; Mei Hua San Nong

霸王别姬; Ba Wang Bie Ji

凤求凰; Feng Qiu Huang

广陵散; Guang ling San

渔舟唱晚; Yu Zhou Chang Wan

== See also ==
- Chinese music
