= Huluhu =

Chinese bowed string instrument

- Classification: Bowed string instrument

Related instruments
- Dahu; Erhu; Gaohu; Gehu; Huqin; Sihu; Yehu; Zhonghu; Zhuihu

The huluhu (traditional: 葫蘆胡; simplified: 葫芦胡; pinyin: húlúhú) is a Chinese bowed string instrument in the huqin family of instruments. It has two strings, and its sound box is made from a gourd, with a face made of thin wood. It is used primarily by the Zhuang people of the southern Chinese province of Guangxi.

The instrument's name is derived from the Chinese words húlú ("gourd") and hú (short for huqin).

== See also ==
- Chinese music
- List of Chinese musical instruments
- Huqin
