= Maguhu =

- Classification: Bowed string instruments

Related instruments
- Dahu; Erhu; Gaohu; Gehu; Huqin; Sihu; Yehu; Zhonghu; Zhuihu

The maguhu (simplified Chinese: 马骨胡; traditional Chinese: 馬骨胡; pinyin: mǎgǔhú) is a Chinese bowed string instrument in the huqin family of musical instruments. It has two strings and its sound box is made from the femur bone of a horse (or alternatively a cow or mule). The front end of the sound box is covered with snake skin (or, alternatively, shark or frog skin), and the end of the neck is carved in the shape of a horse's head.

The maguhu is used primarily by the Zhuang and Buyei peoples of the southern Chinese province of Guangxi. It is used in the ensemble that accompanies guiju (桂剧; "Guangxi opera") and is also used in the bayin (八音) ensemble of the Zhuang people (along with the tuhu, huluhu, sanxian, drums, cymbals, and other instruments).

== See also ==
- Chinese music
- List of Chinese musical instruments
- Huqin
