= Datong (instrument) =

Chinese musical instrument

- Chinese: 大筒
Transcriptions
Standard Mandarin
- Hanyu Pinyin: dàtǒng

The datong (大筒) is a bowed string instrument in the huqin family, and is used as an accompanying instrument in the huaguxi opera tradition of Hunan, China. Referring to this role, the instrument is also referred to huagu datong (花鼓大筒).

Traditionally the datong was constructed with a bamboo body, and covered on the playing end with snakeskin. Its neck is made of hardwood. Silk strings were used in the past, but most contemporary players use steel strings.

The datong is held upright on the lap when played.

The datong should not be confused with the datongxian (also called daguangxian), another type of Chinese fiddle that is used in Taiwan and Fujian.

== See also ==
- Chinese music
- List of Chinese musical instruments
