= Hohak Band =

Taiwanese band

Hohak Band (sometimes Ho-hak Band, Trad.: 好客樂隊) is a Taiwanese band composed of ex-members of the Labor Exchange Band plus Huqin performer Xiao Shiwei and guitarist Ke Zhihao. Like Labor Exchange, Hohak Band uses traditional Han-Chinese instruments extensively, alongside Western ones.

The name "Hohak" (or Ho-hak) is Hakka for "full of hospitality".

Their initial release is an EP titled Peach Blossoms Are Blooming (桃花開).
