= Jing erhu =

The jing erhu (Chinese: 京二胡; pinyin: jīng'èrhú) is a Chinese two-stringed bowed musical instrument in the huqin family of instruments, similar to the erhu. It is so named because it is used in jing xi, or Beijing opera. It is lower in pitch than the jinghu, which is the leading melodic instrument in the Beijing opera orchestra, and is considered a supporting instrument to the jinghu. Its deep tone is one octave lower than the jinghu and the kokyu, a Japanese instrument that uses a similar tone to the jing erhu.

The jing erhu has a wooden body and neck. It is played vertically, with the body resting on the player's left thigh and the horsehair of the bow passing between the two strings. It previously used silk strings, but since the 1960s has more commonly used steel strings.

The jing erhu was popularized in the 1920s by Wang Shaoqing (王少卿), a musician in the troupe of Mei Lanfang.

== See also ==
- Erhu
- Jinghu
- Huqin
- List of Chinese traditional instruments
