= Sanhu =

The sanhu proper (Chinese: 三胡; pinyin: sānhú) is a Chinese bowed musical instrument with three strings. It was developed in the 1970s and is essentially a three-stringed version of the two-stringed erhu, with an additional bass string.

The Yi people of the Yunnan province of southwest China play a large three-stringed traditional bowed instrument (Yizu sanhu, sanhu of Yi) that is also referred to as the sanhu^{photo}, which was developed in early Qing Dynasty from Xiqin.

== See also ==
- Chinese music
- List of Chinese musical instruments
- Huqin
