= Khuuchir =

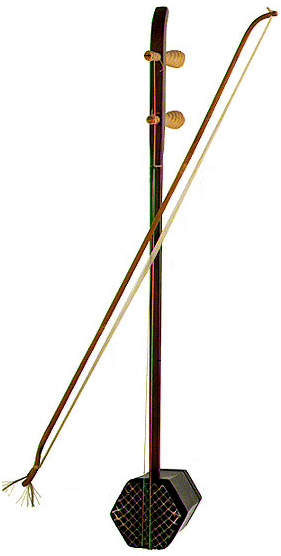

String instrument
- Classification: Chordophone: Bowed string instrument
- Hornbostel–Sachs classification: 321.313-71 (Spike tube lutes)

Related instruments
- Huqin; Sihu

The khuuchir (Mongolian: хуучир, ᠬᠣᠭᠣᠴᠢᠷ) is a bowed musical instrument of Mongolia.

The Mongolian Khuuchir (also Huuchir) is considered the predecessor of Chinese instruments like the more popular of the hu'kin or huqin instruments, the "erhu", —er meaning two in Chinese, referring to the two strings of the instrument, and Hu meaning foreign, or barbarian.

Like the huqin instruments, the instrument consists of a round, hexagonal, or octagonal sound box at the bottom with a neck attached that protrudes upwards. They also usually have two strings, and their soundboxes are typically covered with either snakeskin (most often python) or thin wood.

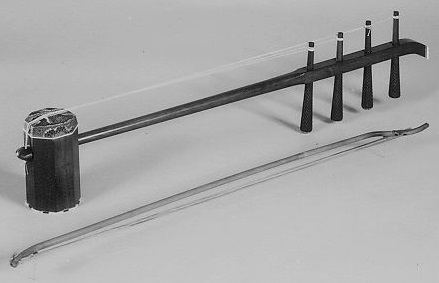
Sihu (Four stringed khuuchir)

The Khuuchir —the Mongolian name used today actually derives from the Chinese name Huqin— like its relative the Erhu, could be traced back to more than a thousand years, being introduced to China in the Tang Dynasty (A.D.618-907) probably during the military campaigns against the steppe nomads.

The Khuuchir, or Erhu is also believed to have evolved from the xiqin instrument, from ancient nomadic Hu-people (also named Five barbarians) such as the Xí tribe, or other similar proto-mongol steppe nomadic peoples. Thus, the Chinese name Huqin refers to a "string instrument of the Hu people", showing that the instrument may have come from regions of the Mongolian Plateau, to the north, west or northeastern areas of today's China.

A double-stringed version also exists, the "si'khuu or sihu", with si (meaning four) replacing er (two).

== See also ==
- Music of Mongolia
- Music of Central Asia
