= Kongahyan =

A kongahyan is an Indonesian musical instrument played by drawing a bow across one or more strings. Kongahyans are similar to the rebab, which can be found in Java, Bali and Sunda Islands. This musical instrument is played for shows on those islands. The kongahyan is smaller than two other Indonesian instruments, the tehyan and sukong.

== History ==
Nowadays, kongahyans are adapted from Chinese musical instruments, specifically the erhu. The erhu spread from China into Eurasia.

== Material ==
Kongahyans were made from bamboo until the 1950s, when bamboo was replaced by coconut shell, which produces a harder sound.

== Usage ==
Kongahyan is used for:

- Gambang Kromong
- Lenong
- Ondel-ondel
- Topeng Betawi
