= Đàn hồ =

Vietnamese musical instrument

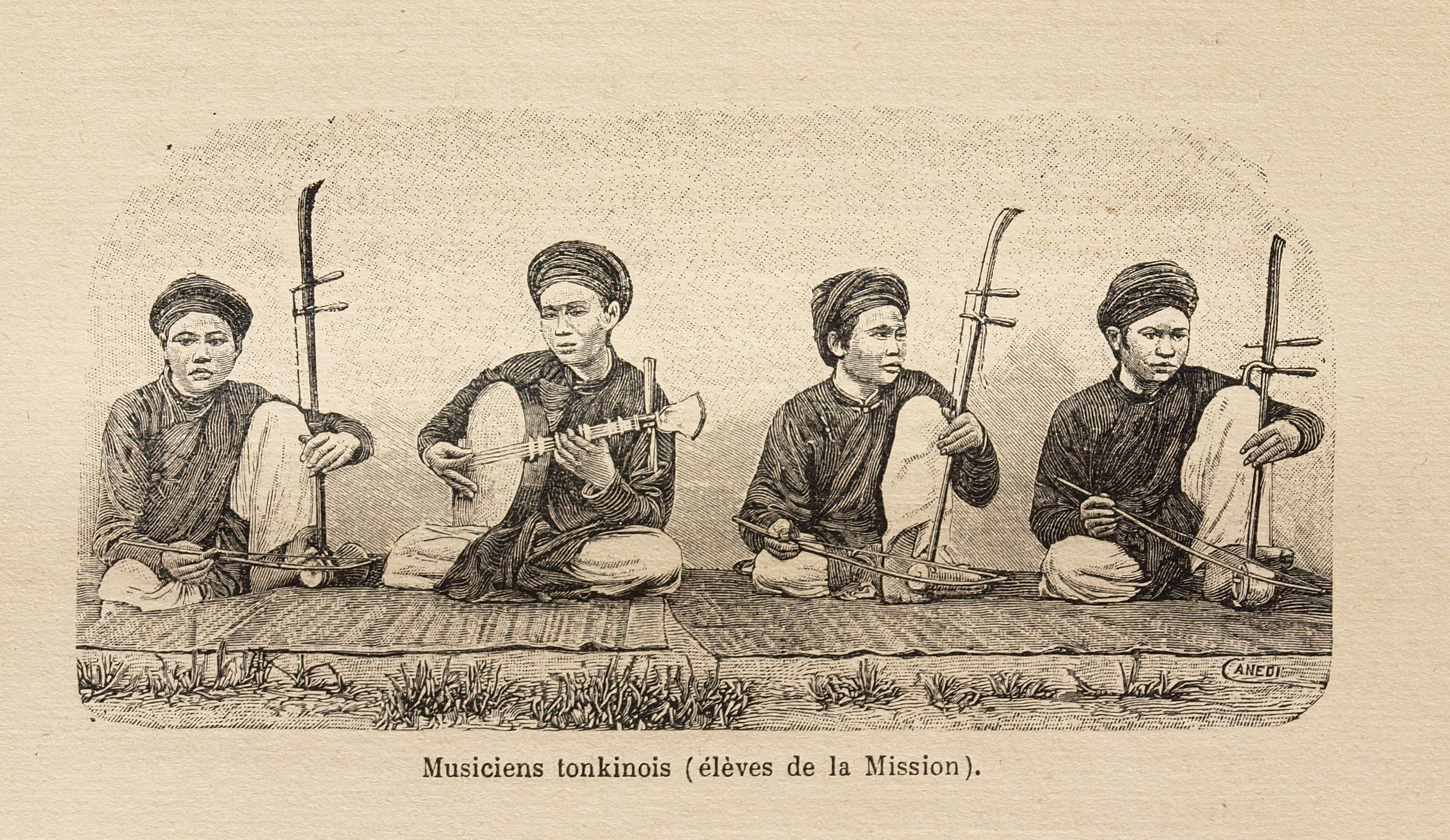
The second man from the right is playing the đàn hồ

The đàn hồ (Chữ Nôm: 彈胡) is a two-stringed vertical violin with wooden resonator. The term hồ ("barbarian, central Asian" 胡) derives from Chinese hu, as in Chinese huqin 胡琴). It is similar to the yehu.
