= Kezaixian =

Chinese musical instrument

The kezaixian (Chinese: 殼仔絃; Pe̍h-ōe-jī: khak-á-hiân) is a bowed string instrument in the huqin family originating in China. More specifically a type of yehu, it is a two-stringed fiddle and is used in Taiwan opera.

Traditionally the khak-a-hian is constructed with a coconut body.

== See also ==
- Chinese music
- List of Chinese musical instruments
- Huqin
