= Haegeum =

Korean traditional string instrument

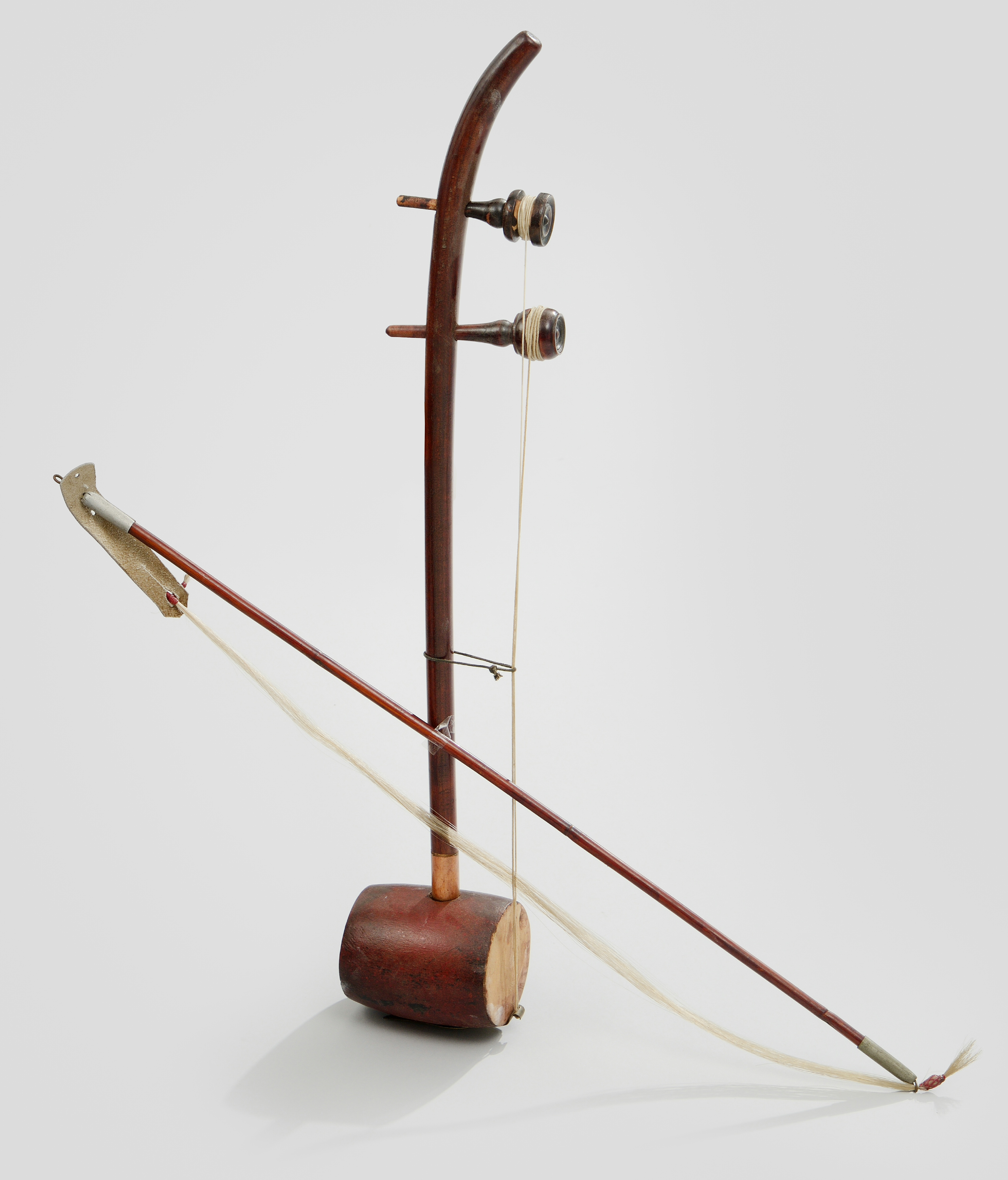
- Classification: Bowed string instrument

Related instruments
- Erhu, Erxian

- Korean name
- Hangul: 해금
- Hanja: 奚琴
- RR: haegeum
- MR: haegŭm

The haegeum (Korean: 해금) is a traditional Korean string instrument, resembling a vertical fiddle with two strings; derived from the ancient Chinese xiqin. It has a rodlike neck, a hollow wooden soundbox, and two silk strings, and is held vertically on the knee of the performer and played with a bow. It is also popularly known as kkangkkang-i (깡깡이), kkaengkkaeng-i (깽깽이), or aeng-geum (앵금).

The haegeum is one of the most widely used instruments in Korean music. The haegeum is used in court music as well as madangnori (ordinary people's music). The haegeum's range of expression is various despite having only two strings, with sounds ranging from sorrowful and sad to humorous. The haegeum is made using eight materials: metal, stone, silk, bamboo, gourd, clay, hide, and wood, and so it is called paleum (eight sounds).

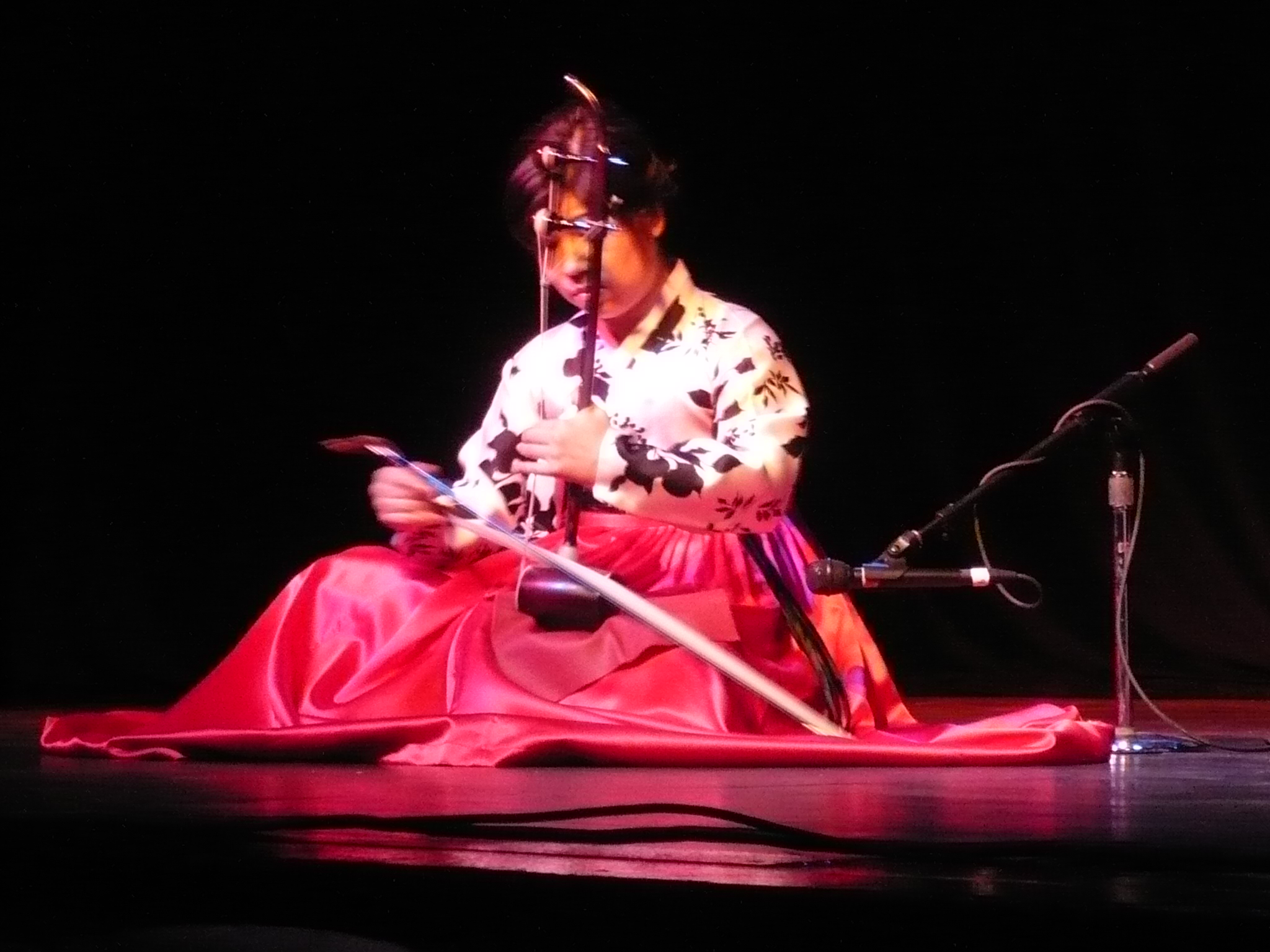
Jung Su-nyun playing haegeum sanjo

The sohaegeum (소해금) is a modernized fiddle with four strings, used only in North Korea and in the Yanbian Korean Autonomous Prefecture in China.

The haegeum is a Korean musical instrument played with a wooden bow between two strings, standing in line with a large wooden block standing vertically on top of the ring box. The haegeum is also classified as a string instrument because it consists of two strings made of silk thread. However, it is classified as a wind instrument because it serves as a wind instrument that can make a continuous sound using a bow. The haegeum has a unique tone, so it is characterized by a unique tone rather than matching with other wind or string instruments.

== History ==
There are no records about the exact era when the haegeum was first introduced in Korea. According to several sources, references to the haegeum can be found in hanlimbyeolgok (the unrhymed verse and songs of the royal scholars) made in the Goryeo dynasty, so it can be inferred that the haegeum has been played at least since then.

In the Joseon Dynasty, the haegeum was used in various music: that of royal ancestral rites, parades, festivals, and hyangak (Korean music).

The way the haegeum is played changed dramatically since the Joseon Dynasty. Before middle Joseon period, musicians played the string in gyeong-an method (placing and stopping with no pulling on strings like western bowed-string instrument), but since then they have begun to play in yeok-an method (pulling the string). Accordingly, it is possible to make a wide variety of sounds by pulling and releasing strings since it has no fingerboard.

To improve the acoustic ability of the haegeum, various modifications have been introduced since the 1960s. In 1965, Park Hun-bong and Kim Bun-gi developed a low-tune Haegeum, and in 1967 Kim Gisu made a small haegeum.

== See also ==
- Erhu
- Huqin
- Kokyū
- Korean music
- Traditional Korean musical instruments
