= Donskoy ryley =

Russian musical instrument

String instrument
- Classification: String instrument
- Hornbostel–Sachs classification: (Composite chordophone)

Related instruments
- Hurdy-gurdy

The Donskoy ryley (Russian: Донской рылей) is a stringed musical instrument from Russia. It is a type of hurdy-gurdy, where the strings are constantly bowed by a wheel which is turned using a crank, and the pitch of the strings changed by keys attached to sliding tangents.
