= Jinghu (instrument) =

Chinese bowed string instrument

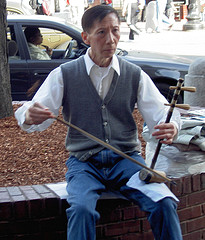
- Musician playing the jinghu in Harvard Square, Cambridge, Massachusetts, United States. (5 May 2006)
- Classification: Bowed string instrument

Related instruments
- Erhu; Huqin

The jinghu (京胡; pinyin: jīnghú) is a Chinese bowed string instrument in the huqin family, used primarily in Beijing opera. It is the smallest and highest pitched instrument in the huqin family. The jinghu has a tone similar to a violin but raspier.

== Construction ==
Like most of its relatives, the jinghu has 2 strings that are customarily tuned to the interval of a 5th which the hair of the non-detachable bow passes in between. The strings were formerly made of silk, but in modern times are increasingly made of steel or nylon. Unlike other huqin instruments (erhu, gaohu, zhonghu, etc.) it is made of bamboo. Its cylindrical soundbox is covered with snakeskin (python) on the front (playing) end, which forms a taut drum on which the bridge (bamboo) rests, sandwiched between the drum and the strings, which are connected to a peg at the bottom of the soundbox.

== Use ==
In Beijing opera, the jinghu mostly follows the singer's voice but adds ornamentation. Jinghu performers in Beijing opera rarely shift into higher positions, and instead choose to compress the melody into a single octave.

The jinghu was also featured prominently in the single "Shinjitsu no Uta" by the Japanese band Do as Infinity.

== See also ==
- Huqin
- Music of China
- Traditional Chinese musical instruments
- String instruments
