= Jiaohu =

Chinese bowed string instrument

The jiaohu (Chinese: 角胡; pinyin: jiǎohú) is a Chinese bowed string instrument in the huqin family of musical instruments. Although very similar to the Jinghu and Ehru in physical structure, the Jiaohu is a traditional Chinese instrument. It is a small two-stringed fiddle-like instrument that requires a bow in order to produce its sound. Its sound box is made from the horn of a cow. The open front end of the sound box is covered with snake skin. As with many of the diverse instruments in China, many Huqin stringed instruments were used in feudal times to accentuate traditions, festivals, rituals, and court life. Chinese operas, especially in Beijing, required the use of elegant music and instruments, thus many woodwinds, drums, and stringed instruments including the Jiaohu were used in ensembles to give operas more emotional meaning. It has two strings and its sound box is made from the horn of a cow. The open front end of the sound box is covered with snake skin. The instrument is used primarily by the Gelao people of the southern Chinese province of Guangxi. The instrument's name is derived from the Chinese words jiǎo (角; 'horn') and hú (胡; short for huqin).

== See also ==
- Chinese music
- List of Chinese musical instruments
- Huqin
- Gelao people
