= Sohaegeum =

Musical instrument

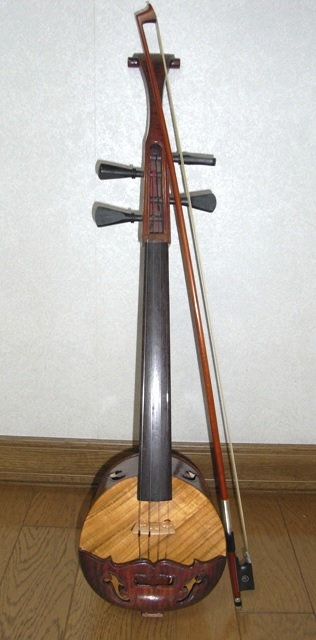

The sohaegeum (Korean: 소해금; Hanja: 小奚琴) is a North Korean musical instrument, developed in the 1960s. It is essentially a modernized form of the haegeum (a traditional Korean bowed vertical fiddle).

Its tuning pegs are like those of the violin, inserted from the side, compared to those of the haegeum, which are inserted from the front. The bow used is not used in between the strings but is played from the front like the violin also.

== See also ==
- Haegum
- Huqin
- Kokyū
- Traditional Korean musical instruments
