= Xiqin (instrument) =

Musical instrument

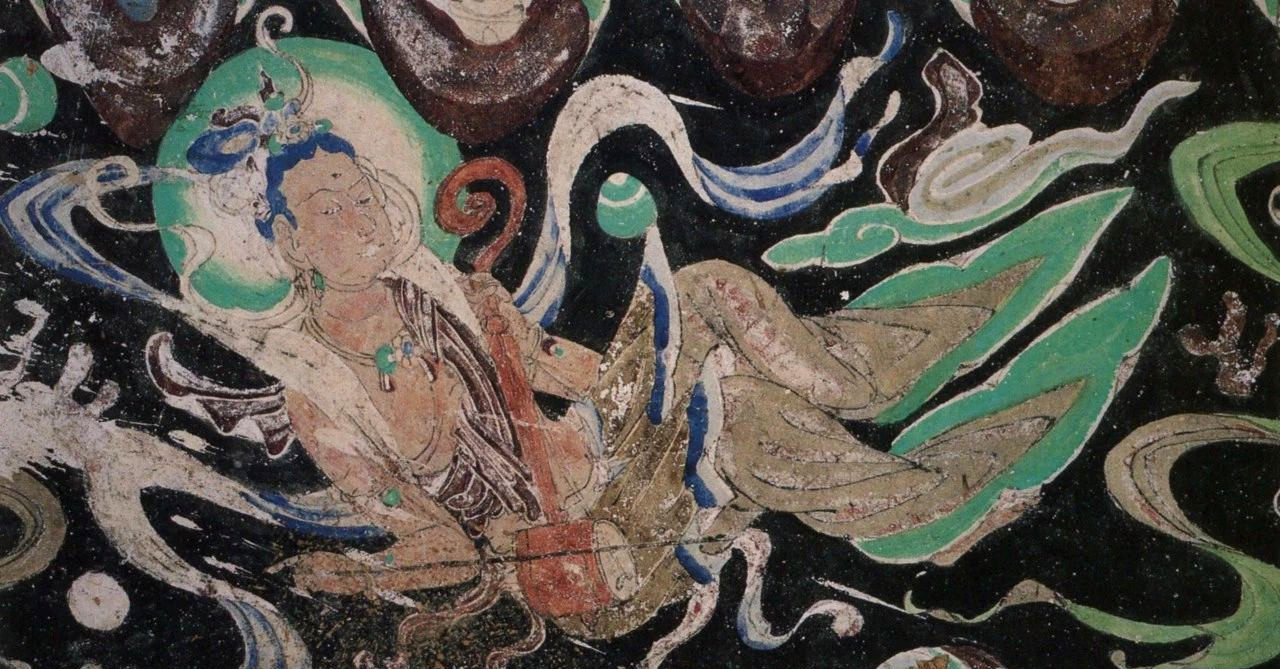
Painting of a Xiqin or Erhu from Yulin cave 10, Western Xia, (1036-1227 C.E.)

The xiqin (Chinese: 奚琴; pinyin: Xī qín) was a bowed 2-string string musical instrument. The instrument was called xiqin in China, referencing the Xi (the creators, a Mongol tribe) and qin (Chinese for stringed instrument). It is perhaps the original member of the huqin family of Mongolian and Chinese bowed string instruments; thus, the morin khuur and erhu and all similar fiddle instruments may be said to be derived from the xiqin. The xiqin had two silk strings and was held vertically.

== Origin and development ==
The xiqin is believed to have been developed by the Kumo Xi, a Mongol- or Khitan-related ethnic group living in the Xar Moron River valley in northeast China.

The xiqin first appeared in China during the Tang dynasty (618–907 CE), during which time it was used in the palace orchestra and bowed with a bamboo stick. It was further developed in the Song dynasty (960–1279), when it began to be bowed with a horsehair bow.

In 1105, during the Northern Song dynasty, the instrument was described as a foreign, two-stringed fiddle in an encyclopedic work on music called Yuè Shū (樂書; literally "book of music") by the music theorist Chen Yang (陳暘).

== Similar instruments ==
The erxian used in nanguan music and the kyl kiak used in kuu music of Kyrgyzstan is similar in construction to the xiqin. The Korean haegeum is also very similar in shape to the xiqin from which it is derived; in fact, its name is simply the Korean pronunciation of the same Chinese characters. The Chinese characters in Cantonese would be hai kum which shows that the name in Middle Chinese would probably sounds more like Cantonese or Korean rather than the current Mandarin transliteration; however, the Mongolian khuuchir or khoochur is seen as directly related to the etymology of Old Chinese, which is retained in the modern Mandarin example of huqin or huchin, which is the general description of all spike-fiddles which originated with the ancient nomadic Hu-people, including the xiqin.

== See also ==
- Huqin
- Haegeum
