= Drejelire =

String instrument with a keyboard

The drejelire is a string instrument with a keyboard, specifically, a type of hurdy-gurdy that uses a rosined wheel to create sound.

The drejelire is made of wood. There is a crank at the bottom, which must be moved continuously to produce sounds, and key-like buttons on the side, which the player must press to obtain a correct pitch.

== See also ==
- Lira (Ukrainian instrument)
