= Daguangxian =

Chinese chordophone

The daguangxian (simplified Chinese: 大广弦; traditional Chinese: 大廣弦; pinyin: dàguǎngxián; Pe̍h-ōe-jī: tōa-kóng-hiân; lit. 'great broad bowstring') is a Chinese bowed two-stringed musical instrument in the huqin family of instruments, held on the lap and played upright. It is used primarily in Taiwan and Fujian, among the Hakka and Min Nan people.

It is also referred to as datongxian (Chinese: 大筒弦), guangxian (simplified Chinese: 广弦; traditional Chinese: 廣弦; Pe̍h-ōe-jī: kóng-hiân), and daguanxian (Chinese: 大管弦; Pe̍h-ōe-jī: tāi-koán-hiân).

== See also ==
- Chinese music
- List of Chinese musical instruments
