= Huqin =

Family of bowed string instruments

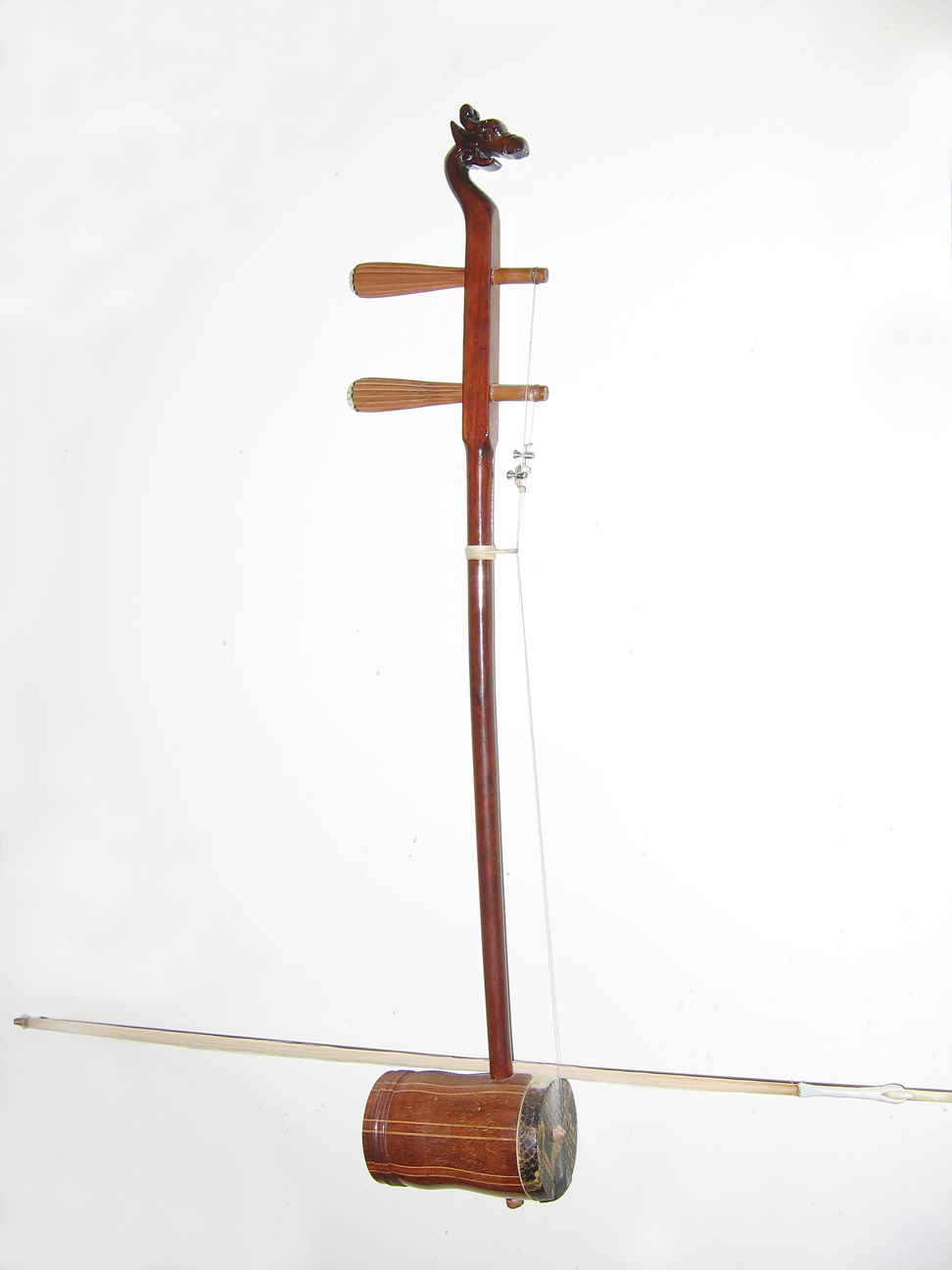

String instrument
- Classification: Chordophone: Bowed string instrument

Related instruments
- Banhu; Dahu; Erhu; Gaohu; Gehu; Sihu; Yehu; Zhonghu; Zhuihu

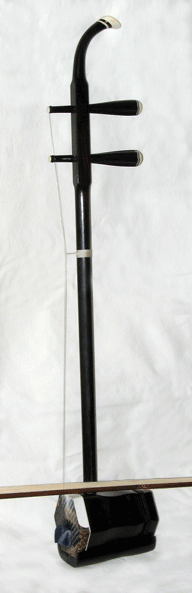
Side view of an erhu, a common huqin

Huqin (Chinese: 胡琴; pinyin: húqin) is a family of bowed string instruments, more specifically, a spike fiddle popularly used in Chinese music. The instruments consist of a round, hexagonal, or octagonal sound box at the bottom with a neck attached that protrudes upwards. They also usually have two strings, and their soundboxes are typically covered with either snakeskin (most often python) or thin wood. Huqin instruments usually have two tuning pegs, one peg for each string. The pegs are attached horizontally through holes drilled in the instrument's neck. Most huqin have the bow hair pass in between the strings. Exceptions to having two strings and pegs include variations of huqin with three, four, and sometimes even more than five. These include the zhuihu, a three stringed huqin, the sihu, a huqin of Mongolian origin, and the sanhu, a lesser-known three-stringed variation.

The most common huqin are the erhu, which is tuned to a middle range; zhonghu, which is tuned to a lower register, and gaohu, which is tuned to a higher pitch. The lowest pitched huqins include the dahu and gehu. The highest pitched huqin is the jinghu, used in the Beijing opera. Over eighty types of huqin instruments have been documented.

Huqin instruments are believed to have come from the nomadic Hu people, who lived on the extremities of ancient Chinese kingdoms, possibly descending from an instrument called the Xiqin (奚琴), originally played by the Xi tribe.Mongolian people have cultural and ethnic heritage of the ancient Hu nomads, and the Mongol version of the xiqin, known as the khuuchir, is testament to this shared heritage.

In the 20th century, large bass huqin such as the dihu, gehu, and diyingehu were developed for use in modern Chinese orchestras. Of these, the gehu and diyingehu would be analogous to Occidental cellos and double basses respectively, and were designed to have a timbre that would blend in with the sound of traditional huqin. These instruments generally have four strings and fingerboards, and are played in a similar manner to cellos and double basses, and are very different from the traditional huqin.

Similar instruments also feature in the music traditions of neighboring countries, such as Mongolia, Korea, Japan, Kyrgyzstan, Vietnam, Thailand, Cambodia, Indonesia, and Laos.

== List of Chinese huqin instruments ==
- Erhu (二胡); also called nanhu (南胡)
- Erquanqin (二泉琴); slightly larger erhu used specifically to play the melody Erquan Yingyue (二泉映月)
- Gaohu (高胡); also called yuehu (粤胡)
- Banhu (板胡)
- Jinghu (京胡)
- Jing erhu (京二胡)
- Zhonghu (中胡)
- Yehu (椰胡)
- Erxian (二弦)
- Tiqin (提琴)
- Tihu (提胡)
- Daguangxian (大广弦)
- Datong (大筒)^{photo}
- Datongxian (大筒弦)^{photo}
- Kezaixian (壳仔弦) - two-stringed fiddle with coconut body, used in Taiwan opera
- Hexian (和弦)
- Huluhu (traditional: 葫蘆胡; simplified: 葫芦胡)
- Maguhu (traditional: 馬骨胡; simplified: 马骨胡)
- Tuhu (土胡)
- Jiaohu (角胡)
- Zhuihu (traditional: 墜胡; simplified: 坠胡)
- Zhuiqin (traditional: 墜琴; simplified: 坠琴)
- Leiqin (雷琴)
- Sihu (四胡)
- Sanhu (三胡)
- Liuhu (六胡)
- Dahu (大胡)
- Dihu (低胡)
  - Xiaodihu (小低胡)
  - Zhongdihu (中低胡)
  - Dadihu (大低胡)
- Cizhonghu
- Gehu (革胡)
  - Diyingehu (低音革胡)
- Laruan (拉阮)
  - Dalaruan (大拉阮)
- Paqin (琶琴)
  - Dapaqin (大琶琴)
- Xiqin (奚琴)
- Niutuiqin or niubatui (牛腿琴 or 牛巴腿) (Guizhou)
- Matouqin (馬頭琴) (Inner Mongolia)
- Aijieke (艾捷克) (Xinjiang)
- Sataer (萨它尔) (Xinjiang)
- Shaoqin (韶琴) an electric erhu

== Related instruments in other Asian nations ==
=== Cambodia ===
- Tro (Cambodia)
  - Tro che (Cambodia)
  - Tro Khmer (Cambodia)
  - Tro sau thom (Cambodia)
  - Tro sau toch (Cambodia)
  - Tro u (Cambodia)
  - Tro Ou Chamhieng (Cham people, Cambodia)

=== Indonesia ===
- Kongahyan (Indonesia)
- Tehyan (Indonesia)
- Sukong (Indonesia)

Sukong, Tehyan and Kongahyan are 3 similar instrument. The only difference being the size and tuning. The Sukong has a lower tuning (A and E), the Tehyan has the tuning of D and A and the Kongahyan, the smallest of the 3, has the highest tuning (G and D). These three are used throughout the island of Java and Bali for things like "Gambang Keromong", "Lenong", "Ondel-ondel", and "Topeng Betawi".

=== Japan ===
- Kokyū (Japan) (though this is actually descended from the rebab and related instruments, through South East Asia and the Ryukyu islands)

=== Korea ===
- Haegeum (Korea; derived from the Xiqin)
  - Sohaegeum (North Korea)
  - Junghaegeum (North Korea)
  - Daehaegeum (North Korea)
  - Jeohaegeum (North Korea)

=== Kyrgyzstan/Kazakhstan ===
- kyl kiak (Kobyz)

=== Mongolia ===
- Morin khuur (Mongolia)
- Sihu (Mongolia)

=== Thailand ===
- Saw (Thailand)
  - Saw duang (Thailand)
  - Saw u (Thailand)
  - Saw sam sai (Thailand)
  - Saw peep or saw krapawng (northeast Thailand)
  - Saw bong (northeast Thailand)

=== Tuva ===
- Byzaanchy
- Igil

=== Vietnam ===
- Đàn gáo (Vietnam)
- Đàn hồ (Vietnam; hồ derives from Chinese hu)
- Đàn nhị or Đàn Cò (Vietnam)

== See also ==
- Music of China
- Music of Mongolia
- Rebab
- String instruments
- Traditional Chinese musical instruments
