= Yehu =

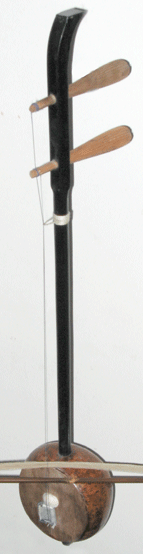
- Classification: Bowed string instrument

Related instruments
- Huqin

The yehu (Chinese: 椰胡; pinyin: yēhú) is a bowed string instrument in the huqin family of Chinese musical instruments. Ye means coconut and hu is short for huqin. It is used particularly in the southern coastal provinces of China and in Taiwan. The instrument's soundbox is made from a coconut shell, which is cut on the playing end and covered with a piece of coconut wood instead of the snakeskin commonly used on other huqin instruments such as the erhu or gaohu. As with most huqin the bow hair passes in between the two strings. Many players prefer to use silk strings rather than the more modern steel strings generally used for the erhu, giving the instrument a distinctly hollow, throaty timbre. The instrument comes in various sizes. In Chaozhou music (where it is called pahi, 冇弦) it is a leading instrument, and is tuned quite high. In Cantonese music it can be quite large and is often tuned to a relatively low pitch, lower than the erhu (usually one octave below the gaohu). It is used as an accompaniment instrument in the local musics and operas of various areas, including Guangdong, Fujian, and Taiwan. It is an important instrument in the music of the Chaozhou and Hakka peoples. In Taiwan, a variety of yehu used in Taiwan opera is called kezaixian.

Related instruments include the Vietnamese đàn gáo, the Thai saw ou, and the Cambodian tro u. The banhu, used primarily in northern China, also has a coconut resonator and wooden face but is tuned quite high and has a much brighter timbre.

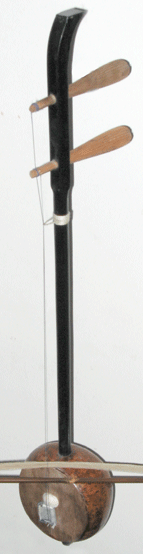
Yehu, type used in Cantonese music

== See also ==
- Huqin
- Banhu
- Đàn gáo
- Chinese music
- Traditional Chinese musical instruments
- String instruments
