= Zhonghu =

Chinese bowed string instrument

- Classification: Bowed string instrument

Related instruments
- Banhu (China); Erhu (China); Gaohu (China); Huqin (China)

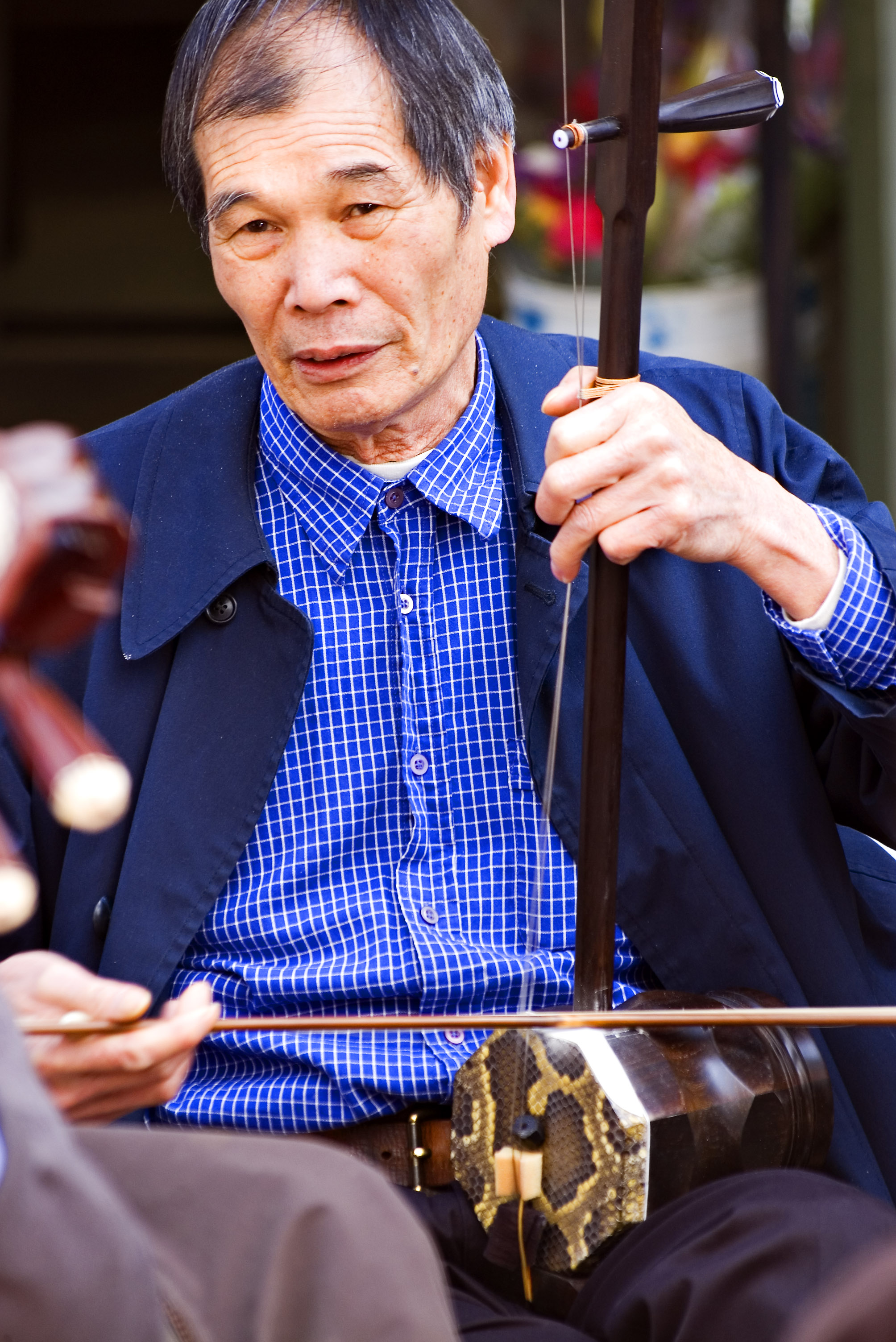
Bowed zhonghu

The zhonghu (Chinese: 中胡; pinyin: zhōnghú), short for zhongyin erhu (Chinese: 中音二胡; pinyin: zhōngyīn èrhú; lit. 'alto erhu', 'middle-voice two-string') is a low-pitched Chinese bowed string instrument. Together with the erhu and gaohu, it is a member of the huqin family. It was developed in the 1940s as the alto member of the huqin family (similar in range to the European viola) to increase the pitch range of the instruments used in a Chinese orchestra.

The zhonghu is analogous with the erhu, but is slightly larger and lower pitched. Its body is covered on the playing end with snakeskin. The instrument has two strings which are generally tuned to the interval of a fifth, to A and E or to G and D (this latter tuning equivalent to the violin's lowest two strings). It has a deep, mellow sound similar to that of the cello.

== Presence in popular music ==
Composer Jeremy Zuckerman has used the Zhonghu in critically acclaimed shows' music such as Avatar: The Last Airbender and The Legend of Korra. Specifically, he has said in the podcast Song Exploder that along with the erhu, the Zhonghu was used in The Legend of Korra's series finale music.

== See also ==
- Huqin
- Music of China
- String instruments
- Traditional Chinese musical instruments
