= Gaohu =

Chinese bowed string instrument

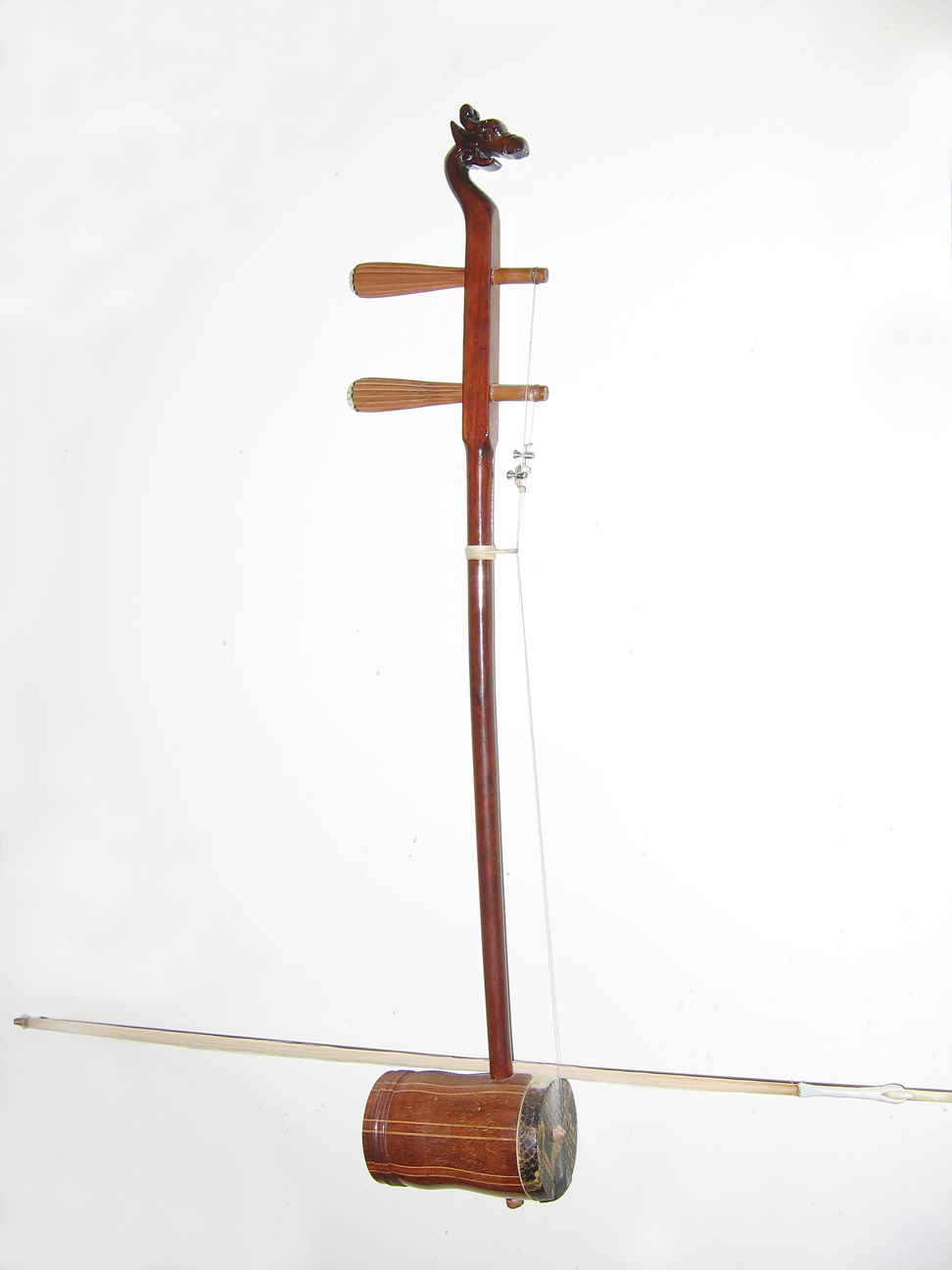
- Gaohu, traditional Guangdong type, with dragon head, round body, no base, and played with the body held between the knees

String instrument
- Classification: chrodophone
- Hornbostel–Sachs classification: 321.312 (spiked bowed lute)
- Inventor: Lü Wencheng

The gaohu (高胡; pinyin: gāohú, pronounced [kɑ́ʊ̯xǔ]; Cantonese: gou1 wu4; also called yuehu 粤胡) is a Chinese bowed string instrument developed from the erhu in the 1920s by the musician and composer Lü Wencheng (1898–1981) and used in Cantonese music and Cantonese opera. It belongs to the huqin family of instruments, together with the zhonghu, erhu, banhu, jinghu, and sihu; its name means "high-pitched huqin". It is the leading instrument of Cantonese music and opera ensembles. Well known pieces for the gaohu include Bu Bu Gao (步步高, Higher Step By Step) and Ping Hu Qiu Yue (平湖秋月, Autumn Moon on Calm Lake).

== Construction and design ==
The gaohu is similar in construction to the erhu but has a slightly smaller soundbox, commonly circular, and is tuned a fourth higher, to G4 and D5. Whereas most huqin are placed on top of the left thigh, the traditional gaohu is played with the soundbox held in between the knees. It has a brighter and lighter tone as compared to the erhu. It has two strings and its soundbox is covered on the front (playing) end with snakeskin (from a python). Since the soundbox is so small, the overall sound of the "gaohu" is quiet

Although originally a regional instrument used only in Cantonese music, the gaohu (in different forms and played placed on the leg, as the erhu) is used in the modern large Chinese orchestra, as part of the string family, along with the erhu, zhonghu, banhu, cello, and double bass.

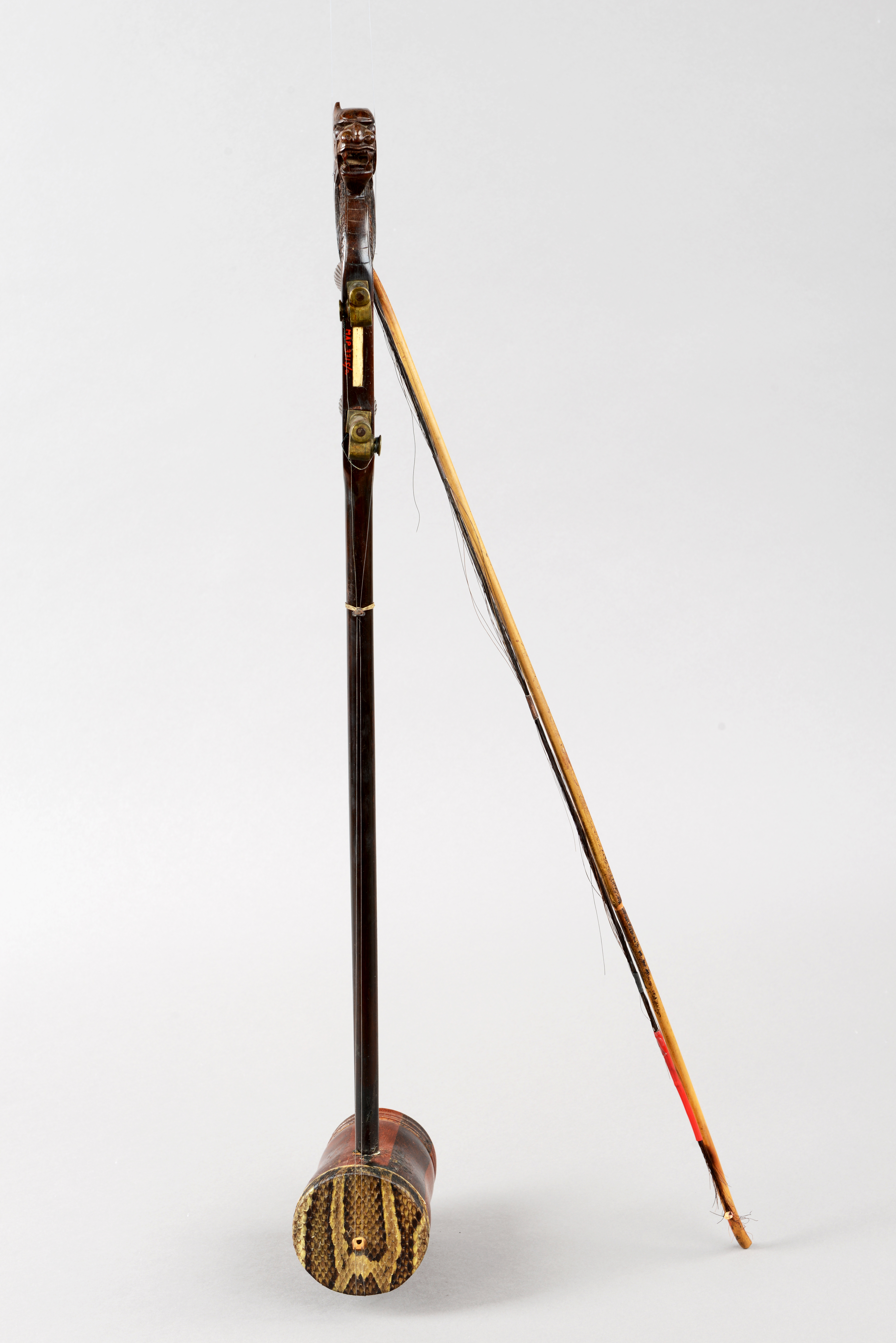
Gaohu – The Asia and Pacific Museum in Warsaw

== Notable players ==
Notable gaohu players include:

- Lü Wencheng (吕文成, pinyin: Lǚ Wénchéng) (1898–1981) in Chinese
- Liu Tianyi (刘天一) (1910–1990) in Chinese
- Gan Shangshi (甘尚时) (1931– )
- Yu Qiwei (余其伟) (1953– ) in English in Chinese

== See also ==
Ping Hu Qiu Yue
Sample of "Ping Hu Qiu Yue" (平湖秋月, Autumn Moon on Calm Lake). Composed by Lü Wencheng. Gaohu solo played by Yu Qiwei, with guzheng accompaniment.

- Cantonese music (disambiguation)
- Cantonese opera
- Huqin
- Music of China
- Traditional Chinese musical instruments
- String instruments
