= Erhu =

Chinese two-stringed bowed musical instrument

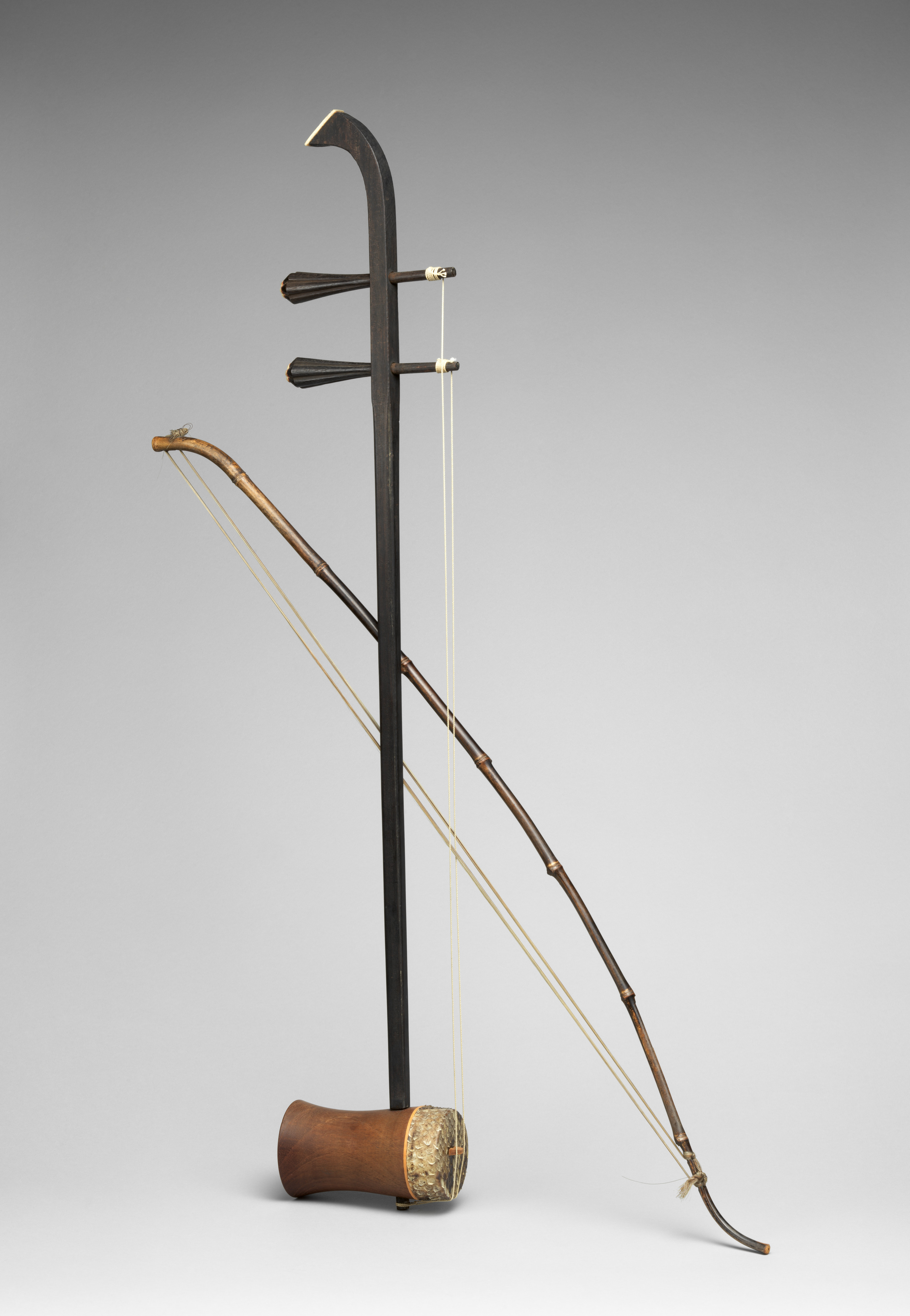
- Classification: Bowed string instrument
- Hornbostel–Sachs classification: 321.313-71 (Spike tube lutes)

Playing range

Related instruments
- Huqin

Erhu
- Chinese: 二胡
Transcriptions
Standard Mandarin
- Hanyu Pinyin: èrhú(r)
- Yale Romanization: èr-hú(r)
- IPA: [âɚ.xǔ]
Yue: Cantonese
- Yale Romanization: yihwú
- Jyutping: ji6 wu4-2
- IPA: [ji˨.wu˧˥]

Erhu sound

The erhu (Chinese: 二胡; pinyin: èrhú; [aɻ˥˩xu˧˥]) is a Chinese two-stringed bowed musical instrument, more specifically a spike fiddle, that is sometimes known in the Western world as the Chinese violin or a Chinese two-stringed fiddle. It is used as a solo instrument as well as in small ensembles and large orchestras. It is the most popular of the huqin family of traditional bowed string instruments used by various ethnic groups of China. As a very versatile instrument, the erhu is used in both traditional and contemporary music arrangements, such as pop, rock and jazz.

== History ==
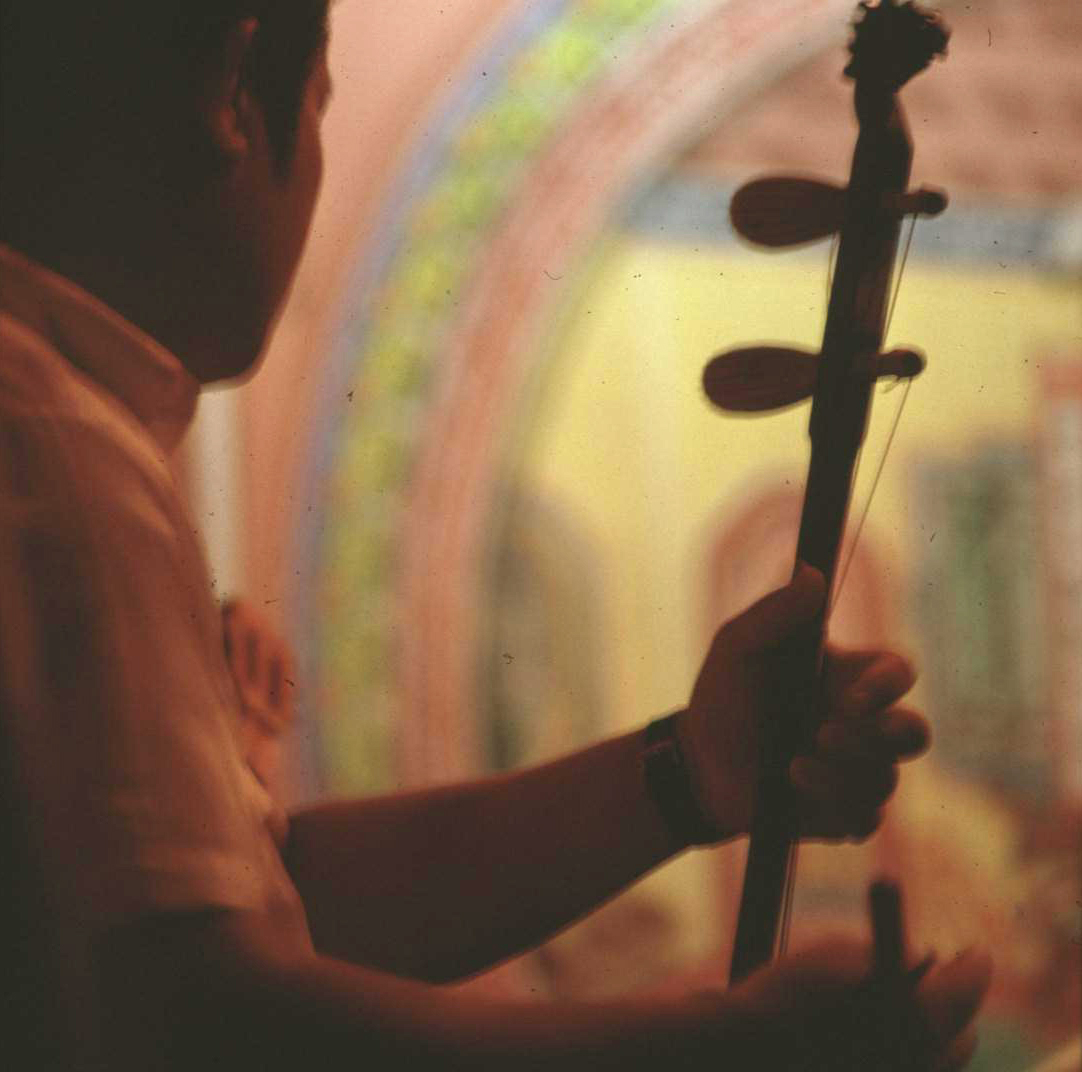
Performer with erhu

The erhu can be traced back to proto-Mongolic instruments which first appeared in China during the Tang dynasty. It is believed to have evolved from the xiqin (奚琴). The xiqin is believed to have originated from the Xi people located in current northeast China.

The first Chinese character of the name of the instrument (二, èr, 'two') is believed to come from the fact that it has two strings. An alternate explanation states that it comes from the fact that it is the second-highest huqin in pitch to the gaohu in the modern Chinese orchestra. The second character (胡, hú) indicates that it is a member of the huqin family, with hu commonly translated to mean 'barbarians'. The name huqin literally means 'instrument of the Hu peoples', suggesting that the instrument may have originated from regions to the north or west of China generally inhabited by nomadic people on the extremities of past Chinese kingdoms.

For most of history, the erhu was mostly a folk instrument used in southern China, whereas the sihu was preferred among northern musicians. However, in the 1920s, Liu Tianhua introduced the erhu to Beijing, and since, it has become the most popular of the huqin.

=== Historical erhu and bowed string bows ===
Historic bowed zithers of China, including the xiqin, yazheng, and wenzhenqin, and also the Korean ajaeng, were originally played by bowing with a rosined stick, which created friction against the strings. As soon as the horsehair bow was invented, it spread very widely.

== Construction ==
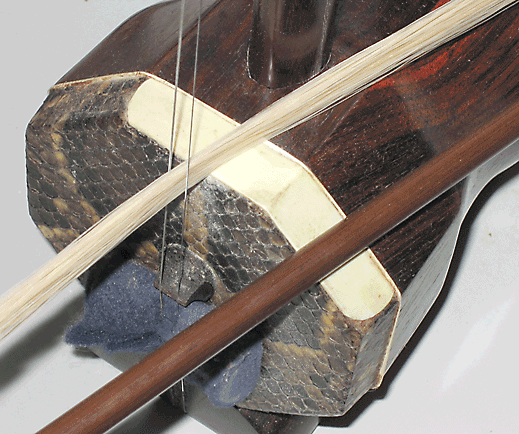
The erhu bow between the strings

The erhu consists of a long vertical stick-like neck, at the top of which are two big tuning pegs, and at the bottom is a small resonator body (sound box) which is covered with python skin on the front (playing) end. Two strings are attached from the pegs to the base, and a small loop of string (千斤, qiān jīn) placed around the neck and strings acting as a nut pulls the strings towards the skin, holding a minute wooden bridge in place.

The erhu has some unusual features:

- Its characteristic sound is produced through the vibration of the python skin by bowing.
- There is no fingerboard; the player stops the strings by pressing their fingertips onto the strings without the strings touching the neck.
- The horse hair bow is never separated from the strings (which were formerly of twisted silk but which today are usually made of metal); it passes between them as opposed to over them (the latter being the case with western bowed stringed instruments).
- Although there are two strings, they are very close to each other and the player's left hand in effect plays as if on one string. The inside string (nearest to player) is generally tuned to D4 and the outside string to A4, a fifth higher. The maximum range of the instrument is three and a half octaves, from D4 up to A7, before a stopping finger reaches the part of the string in contact with the bow hair. The usual playing range is about two and a half octaves.

Various dense and heavy hardwoods are used in making the erhu. According to Chinese references the woods include zi tan (紫檀, red sandalwood and other woods of the genus Pterocarpus such as padauk), lao hong mu (老红木, aged red wood), wu mu (乌木, black wood), and hong mu (红木, red wood). Particularly fine erhu are often made from pieces of old furniture. A typical erhu measures 81 cm (32 in) from top to bottom, the length of the bow also being 81 cm.

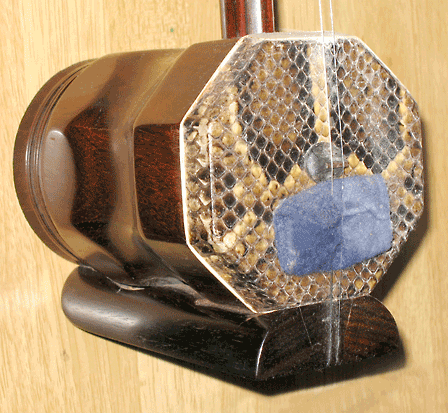
Erhu with ba jiao qin tong (eight-sided body)

The parts of the erhu are:

- Qín tǒng (琴筒), sound box or resonator body; it is hexagonal (liù jiǎo, southern), octagonal (bā jiǎo, northern), or, less commonly, round.
- Qín pí/shé pí (琴皮/蛇皮), skin, made from python. The python skin gives the erhu its characteristic sound.
- Qín gān (琴杆), neck.
- Qín tóu (琴頭), top or tip of neck, usually a simple curve with a piece of bone or plastic on top, but is sometimes elaborately carved with a dragon's head.
- Qín zhóu (琴軸). tuning pegs, traditional wooden, or metal machine gear pegs
- Qiān jīn (千斤), nut, made from string, or, less commonly, a metal hook
- Nèi xián (内弦), inside or inner string, usually tuned to D4, nearest to player
- Wài xián (外弦), outside or outer string, usually tuned to A4
- Qín mǎ (琴碼), bridge, made from wood
- Gōng (弓), bow, has screw device to vary bow hair tension
- Gōng gān (弓杆), bow stick, made from bamboo
- Gōng máo (弓毛), bow hair, usually white horsehair
- Qín diàn (琴墊), pad, a piece of sponge, felt, or cloth placed between the strings and skin below the bridge to improve its sound
- Qín tuō (琴托), base, a piece of wood attached to the bottom of the qín tong to provide a smooth surface on which to rest on the leg

Most erhu are mass-produced in factories. The three most esteemed centres of erhu making are Beijing, Shanghai, and Suzhou. In the collectivist period after the establishment of the People's Republic of China, these factories were formed by merging what had been previously private workshops. Although most erhu were machine-made in production lines, the highest quality instruments were handmade by specialist craftsmen.

In the 20th century, there have been attempts to standardize and improve the erhu, with the aim of producing a louder and better sounding instrument. One major change was the use of steel strings instead of silk. The move to steel strings was made gradually. By 1950 the thinner A-string had been replaced by a violin E-string with the thicker D-string remaining silk. By 1958 professional players were using purpose made D and A steel erhu strings as standard.

=== Use of python skin ===
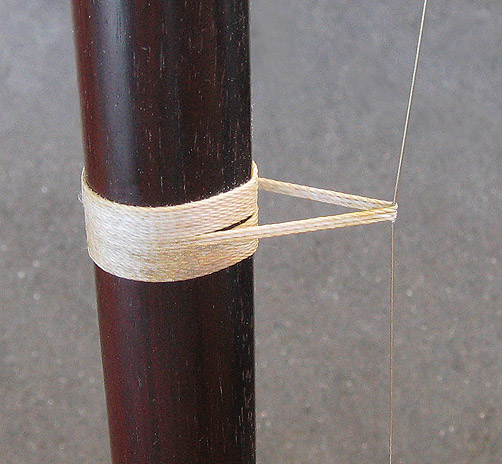
Picture showing qianjin, a loop of string that acts as a nut

In 1988 China passed its Law on the Protection of Endangered Species after ratifying the UN Convention on the International Trade in Endangered Species (CITES), making it illegal to use and trade unlicensed pythons. To regulate the use of python skins, China's State Forestry Administration introduced a certification scheme between python skin sellers in Southeast Asia and musical instrument makers in China. From January 1, 2005, new regulations also require erhu to have a certificate from the State Forestry Administration, which certify that the erhu python skin is not made with wild pythons, but from farm-raised pythons. Individuals are allowed to take up to two erhu out of China when traveling; commercial buyers need additional export certificates.

Outside China, manufacturers of erhu can issue their own CITES licenses with approval by governments of their respective countries. Such exports are legal as they have been made from legal skin sources.

Some erhu are made of recycled products.

The Hong Kong Chinese Orchestra began their research for an alternative to python skin in 2005 and has since designed the Eco-Huqin series, which substitutes python skin with PET Polyester Membrane. For this innovation the Hong Kong Chinese Orchestra received the Ministry of Culture Innovation Award in 2012.

== Erhu music ==
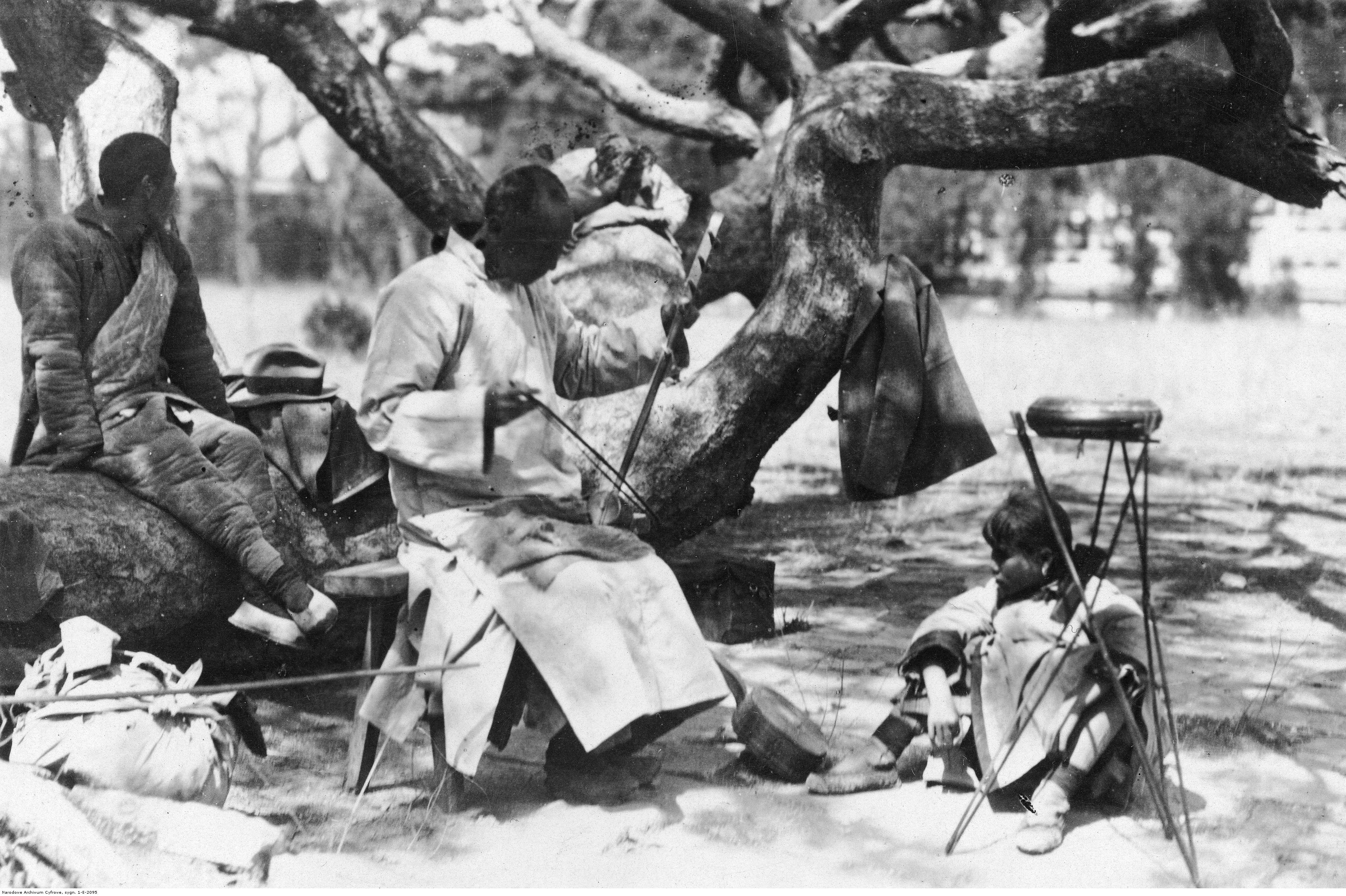
Blind Chinese street musician, Beijing, 1930

A notable composer for the erhu was Liú Tiānhuá (刘天华/劉天華, 1895–1932), a Chinese musician who also studied Western music. He composed 47 exercises and 10 solo pieces (1918–1932) which were central to the development of the erhu as a solo instrument. His works for the instrument include Yue Ye (月夜; Moon Night) and Zhu ying Yao hong (烛影摇红; Shadows of Candles Flickering Red).

Other solo pieces include Er Quan Ying Yue (1950, Two Springs Reflecting the Moon) by Abing, Sai Ma (Horse Race) by Huang Haihuai, Henan Xiaoqu (Henan Folk Tune) by Liu Mingyuan, and Sanmenxia Changxiangqu (1961, Sanmen Gorge Capriccio) by Liu Wenjin. Most solo works are commonly performed with yangqin accompaniment, although pieces such as the ten solos by Liú Tiānhuá and Er Quan Ying Yue (Two Springs Reflecting the Moon) originally did not have accompaniment.

In addition to the solo repertoire, the erhu is one of the main instruments in regional music ensembles such as Jiangnan sizhu, Chinese opera ensembles, and the modern large Chinese orchestra.

The erhu is used in the music of the Cirque du Soleil show O and in solo performances in select Shen Yun tours. Even fusion progressive rock groups like The Hsu-nami have incorporated the erhu into their music and it is their lead instrument. It is incorporated in the Taiwanese black metal band ChthoniC and played by the Tibetan singer alan, and used in the song "Field Below" by Regina Spektor.

An instrumental album by erhu artist Song Fei (宋飞) expresses the painting Along the River During the Qingming Festival (清明上河图; Qīngmíng Shànghé Tú) drawn in the Song dynasty by Zhang Zeduan (张择端). It was performed with the erhu, jinghu, banhu, gaohu, etc., to show the livelihood, trade, festival of the Song dynasty; the album contains 18 parts.

More recently, the erhu has appeared in several soundtracks, featuring prominently in the TV series Earth: Final Conflict (played by George Gao) and the massively multiplayer online role-playing game World of Warcraft: Mists of Pandaria (played by Jiebing Chen). An erhu solo is featured in several cues related to Vulcans from 2009's Star Trek soundtrack by Michael Giacchino.

Musical groups for wedding celebrations in Cambodia often use the Tro, a similar instrument to the erhu.

An erhu is listed in the credits for the Doug Anthony All Stars album Icon as being played by Paul McDermott. The erhu can be heard in the character songs of China, a character in Axis Powers Hetalia.

In 2020, the release of Genshin Impact, Players around the globe were treated to a mixture of traditional Chinese music and fusion with Western orchestra, including pieces that featured the Erhu.

== Comparisons to western instruments ==
=== Violin ===
The erhu is often described as a Chinese fiddle. However, when compared to a western fiddle (violin), it has several key differences:

- While most of both instruments are built largely from wood, the bridge and sound production mechanisms differ greatly. The bridge of an erhu has a flat base, and does not require "fitting" onto an instrument. The reason is that the erhu uses a stretched and flattened python skin as its "top", whereas a violin uses a curved wooden plate.
- The python skin is the primary tone-producing surface of the instrument with either no back or a decorative one, but the violin has a sound post that couples the vibrations of the top and the back.
- The bowing technique also differs. Erhu have the hairs of the bow strung between the two strings, and both sides of the bow hair are used. The violin is played with the bow hair placed on top of the strings.
- The erhu has only two strings while the violin has four.

== Playing technique ==
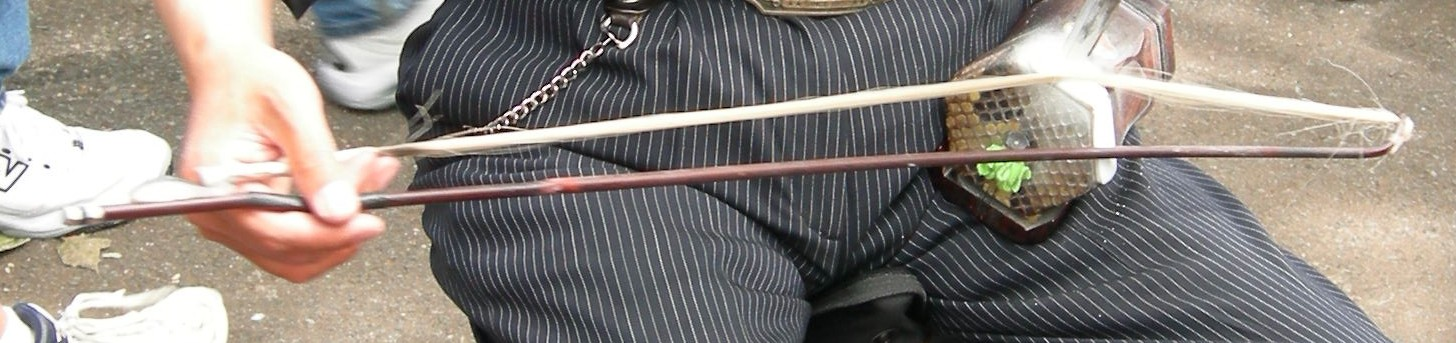
The bow is woven between the strings. Because the hairs are slackened, the bow hand is used to press the hairs away from the bow stick to create enough tension to stroke the strings properly.

=== Tuning ===
The erhu is almost always tuned to the interval of a fifth. The inside string (nearest to player) is generally tuned to D4 and the outside string to A4. This is the same as the two middle strings of the violin.

=== Position ===
The erhu is played sitting down, with the sound box placed on the top of the left thigh and the neck held vertically, in the similar fashion as that of a cello or double bass player. However, performers of more recent years have played while standing up using a specially developed belt-clip.

=== Right hand ===
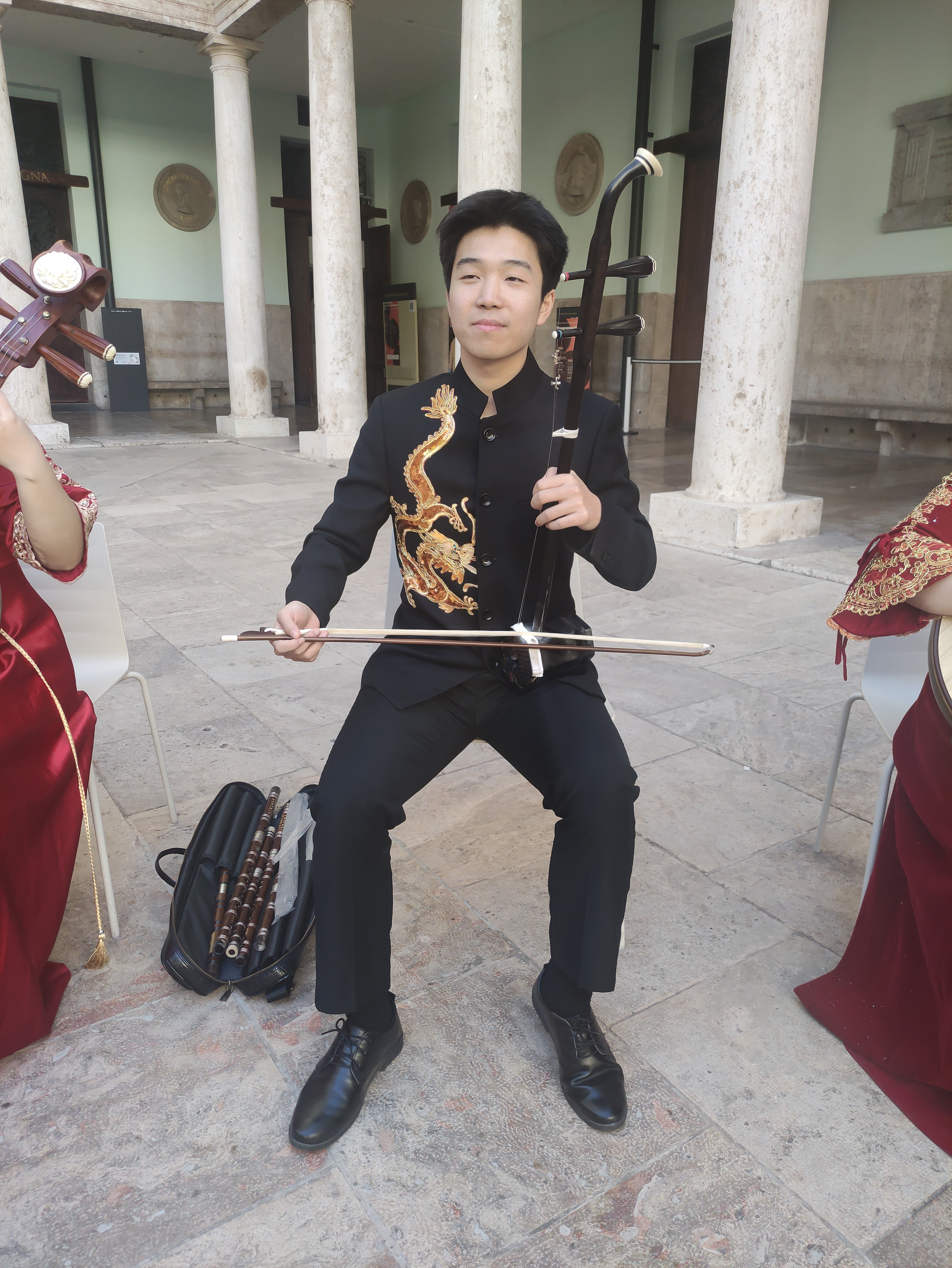
Musician of the NENU Folkloric Orchestra playing erhu in the University of Valencia

The bow is held with an underhand grip. The bow hair is adjusted so it is slightly loose. The fingers of the right hand are used to push the hairs away from the stick in order to create tension in the hairs. The bow hair is placed in between the two strings and both sides of the bow hair are used to produce sound, the player pushes the bow away from the body when bowing the A string (the outside string), and pulls it inwards when bowing the "inside" D string.

Because the bow rests on the barrel, either string can be bowed with minimal effort; the outer string can be played by pressing the stick downwards with the thumb, and the inner string by pressing the hair towards the player with the middle finger. All other fingers are technically unnecessary and are only used to support and stabilize the bow.

Aside from the bowing technique used for most pieces, the erhu can be plucked, usually using the second finger of the right hand. This produces a dry, muted tone (if either of the open strings is plucked, the sound is somewhat more resonant) which is sometimes used in contemporary pieces such as Horse Race.

=== Left hand ===
The left hand alters the pitch of the strings by pressing on the string at the desired point. Being a fretless instrument, the player has fine control over tuning. Techniques include hua yin (slides), rou xian (vibrato), and huan ba (changing positions).

== Notable performers ==
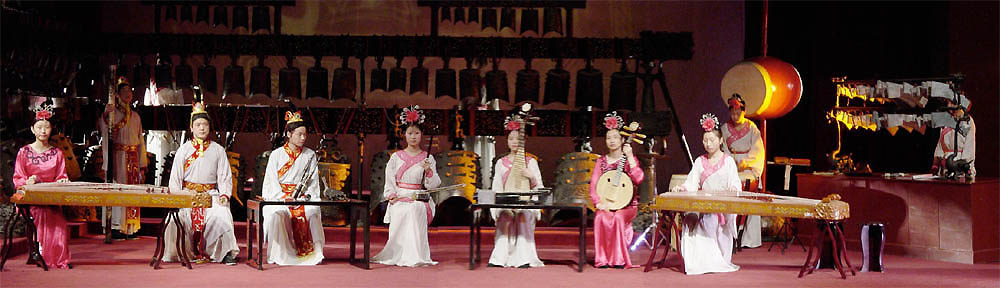
Twelve-member concert group at the Hubei Provincial Museum. The erhu is fourth from left.

Prior to the 20th century, most huqin instruments were used primarily to accompany various forms of Chinese opera and narrative. The use of the erhu as a solo instrument began in the early 20th century along with the development of guoyue (literally 'national music'), a modernized form of Chinese traditional music written or adapted for the professional concert stage. Active in the early 20th century were Zhou Shaomei (周少梅; 1885–1938) and Liú Tiānhuá. Liú laid the foundations of modern erhu playing with his ten unaccompanied solos and 47 studies composed in the 1920s and 1930s. Liu Beimao (刘北茂; 1903–1981) was born in Jiangyin, Jiangsu. His compositions include Xiao Hua Gu (1943) (Little Flower-drum). Jiang Fengzhi (蔣风之; 1908–1986) and Chen Zhenduo (陈振铎) were students of Liú Tiānhuá, the piece Hangong Qiuyue (Autumn Moon over the Han Palace) was adapted and arranged by Jiang. Hua Yanjun (A Bing) (华彥君-阿炳, c. 1893–1950) was a blind street musician. Shortly before his death in 1950, two Chinese musicologists recorded him playing a few erhu and pipa solo pieces, the best-known being Erquan Yingyue.

With the founding of the People's Republic of China and the expansion of the conservatory system, the solo erhu tradition continued to develop. Important performers during this time include Lu Xiutang (陆修堂; 1911–1966), Zhang Rui (张锐; born 1920), Sun Wenming (孙文明; 1928–1962), Huang Haihuai (黄海怀), Liu Mingyuan (刘明源; 1931–1996), Tang Liangde (汤良德; 1938–2010), Zhang Shao (张韶) and Song Guosheng (宋国生).

Liu Mingyuan (刘明源; 1931–1996) was born in Tianjin. He was known for his virtuosity on many instruments of the huqin family, in particular the banhu. His compositions and arrangements include Henan Xiaoqu (Henan Folk Tune) and Cao Yuan Shang (On Grassland) for Zhonghu. For many years, he taught at the China Conservatory of Music in Beijing.

Tang Liangde (Cantonese: Tong Leung Tak; 汤良德; 1938–2010) was born in Shanghai into a famous Shanghainese musical family. He won the "Shanghai's Spring" erhu competition and continued to be the soloist for the Chinese Film Orchestra in Beijing, his composition and solos can be heard throughout the Nixon to China documentary movie. Tang was the soloist and performed at the Hong Kong Chinese Orchestra, then went on to music broadcasting and education for the Hong Kong Government's Music Office making worldwide tours and was named Art Educator of the Year in 1991 by the Hong Kong Artist Guild.

Wang Guotong (王国潼; born 1939) was born in Dalian, Liaoning. He studied with Jiang Fengzhi, Lan Yusong and Chen Zhenduo and, in 1960, graduated from the Central Conservatory of Music in Beijing. He performed the premiere of Sanmenxia Changxiangqu (Sanmen Gorge Rhapsody) composed by Liu Wenjin. In 1972, Wang became the erhu soloist and later art director of the China Broadcasting Traditional Orchestra. He returned to the Central Conservatory of Music in 1983 as head of the Chinese music department. He has written many books and articles on erhu playing and has performed in many countries. Wang also worked with the Beijing National Instruments Factory to further develop erhu design.

Min Huifen (閔惠芬; 1945–2014) was born in Yixing, Jiangsu. She first became known as the winner of the 1963 fourth Shanghai Spring Art Festival. She studied with Lu Xiutang and Wang Yi, and graduated from the Shanghai Conservatory of Music in 1968, and became the erhu soloist with the Shanghai Folk Orchestra. She was the undisputed master of erhu for 50 years.

Xu Ke (许可；1960-) was born in Nanjin. Hong Kong’s HiFi Magazine praised him as the “Paganini in the world of Erhu,” and the Richmond Times Dispatch exclaimed that he “sounds like another Heifetz.” He has expanded the erhu’s range from two to more than four octaves.

Song Fei (宋飞；1969-) from Tianjin, is a member of the Jiusan Society and professor. She has been engaged in teaching, performing and researching erhu and huqin for a long time. Song Fei has premiered more than 50 erhu works including Zhu Diao (竹调); Cu Hun (楚魂); Yan Zhao Chun Chao (燕赵春潮); Ye Cao (野草); Qīngmíng Shànghé Tú (清明上河图; "Along the River During the Qingming Festival"); and Meng Li Hua Kai (梦里花开).

== See also ==
- Dan nhi
- Haegeum
- Huqin, family of traditional Chinese spike fiddles.
- Khuuchir
- Kokyū
- Morin khuur
- Music of China
- Rebab
- Lanna salo
- Sarinda
- String instruments
- Traditional Chinese musical instruments
