= Strohfiddel =

Strohfiddel may refer to:

- Xylophone, based on the German term Strohfiedel, referring to the straw bundles (Stroh) which supported the keys.
- Dulcigurdy, an instrument depicted in 17th-century musical texts, often mislabeled as strohfiddel due to its proximity to a xylophone in a 1618 engraving in Syntagma Musicum.
