= Wheelharp =

The wheelharp is a musical instrument with bowed strings controlled by a keyboard and foot-controlled motor, similar to Leonardo da Vinci's viola organista, a keyboard-operated string instrument for continuously sounding strings by rubbing the strings with spinning wheels, powered by a treadle controlled by one foot of the musician. Created by Jon Jones and Mitchell Manger, the wheelharp debuted at the 2013 NAMM Show in Anaheim, California.

According to the Wall Street Journal, it "looks and works like a cross between a harpsichord and a hurdy-gurdy: a motor driven wheel spins, rubbing against strings when the player depresses a key."

However, the principle of bowed strings in a keyboard instrument is old. Michael Praetorius' Syntagma Musicum depicted a Nürnbergisch Geigenwerk (Geigenklavizimbel).

== See also ==
- Viola organista
- Bowed clavier
