= Harpsichord-viola =

Hybrid musical instrument based on the designs of Leonardo da Vinci

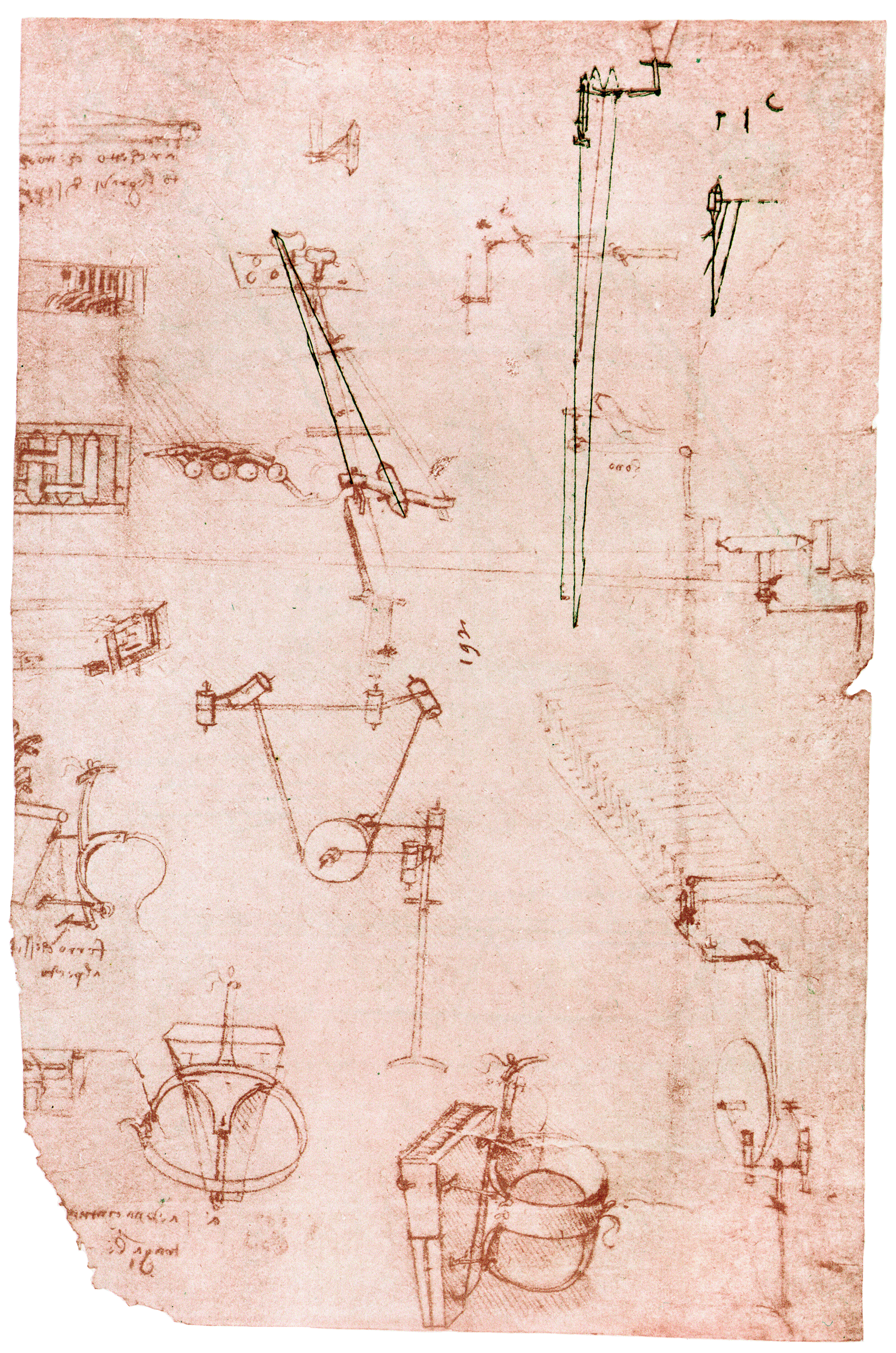
Folio 93r of the Codex Atlanticus with the designs of the harpsichord-viola by Leonardo da Vinci

The harpsichord-viola (in Italian Clavi-viola) is a hybrid musical instrument based on the designs of Leonardo da Vinci on folio 93r of the Codex Atlanticus. It is a different project from the viola organista (folio 886 of the Codex Atlanticus). It is about the size of a child's toy piano. It weighs 33 pounds and straps to the musician's chest. It is unlike anything else in the orchestra. It has the strings of a viola but is played with a keyboard, and it is powered by the musician's legs as he walks. It is built with the materials that Leonardo would have had on hand, including wooden pegs and gears run by twine. In the folio of Leonardo, one can see that the instrument has a harness. So it was invented as a way to play a stringed instrument while marching. The leg pumps a wooden motor, which moves a long loop of horsehair through the instrument. When the player presses the keys, the strings move up against the loop.

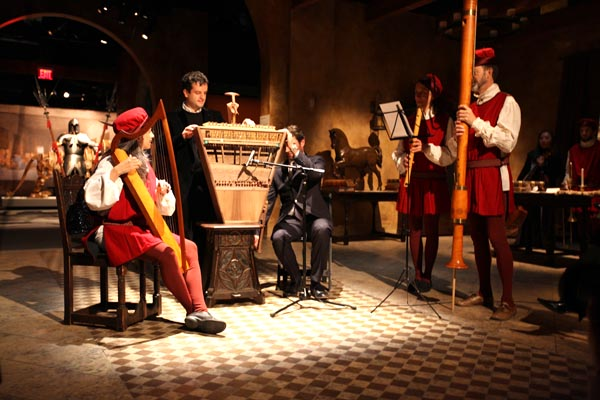
The harpsichord-viola played in New York City in 2009. The working model is on display at the Leonardo3 Museum in Milan, Italy, since 2013

Edoardo Zanon of Leonardo3 has been working on the re-creation on and off for five years. Leonardo might have abandoned the instrument because the wooden motor and gears make a clacking, grinding sound. The first prototype has been presented in New York City in 2009. Massimiliano Lisa, president of Leonardo3, has explained that most of da Vinci's machines, for example the flight machine, do not work or other machines were just toys to impress people. In this case, Leonardo created from scratch a new musical instrument and what makes it important is that this it really works. The working model is on display at the Leonardo3 Museum in Milan, Italy, since 2013.

== See also ==
- List of works by Leonardo da Vinci
