= Bowed clavier =

Archaic keyboard instrument

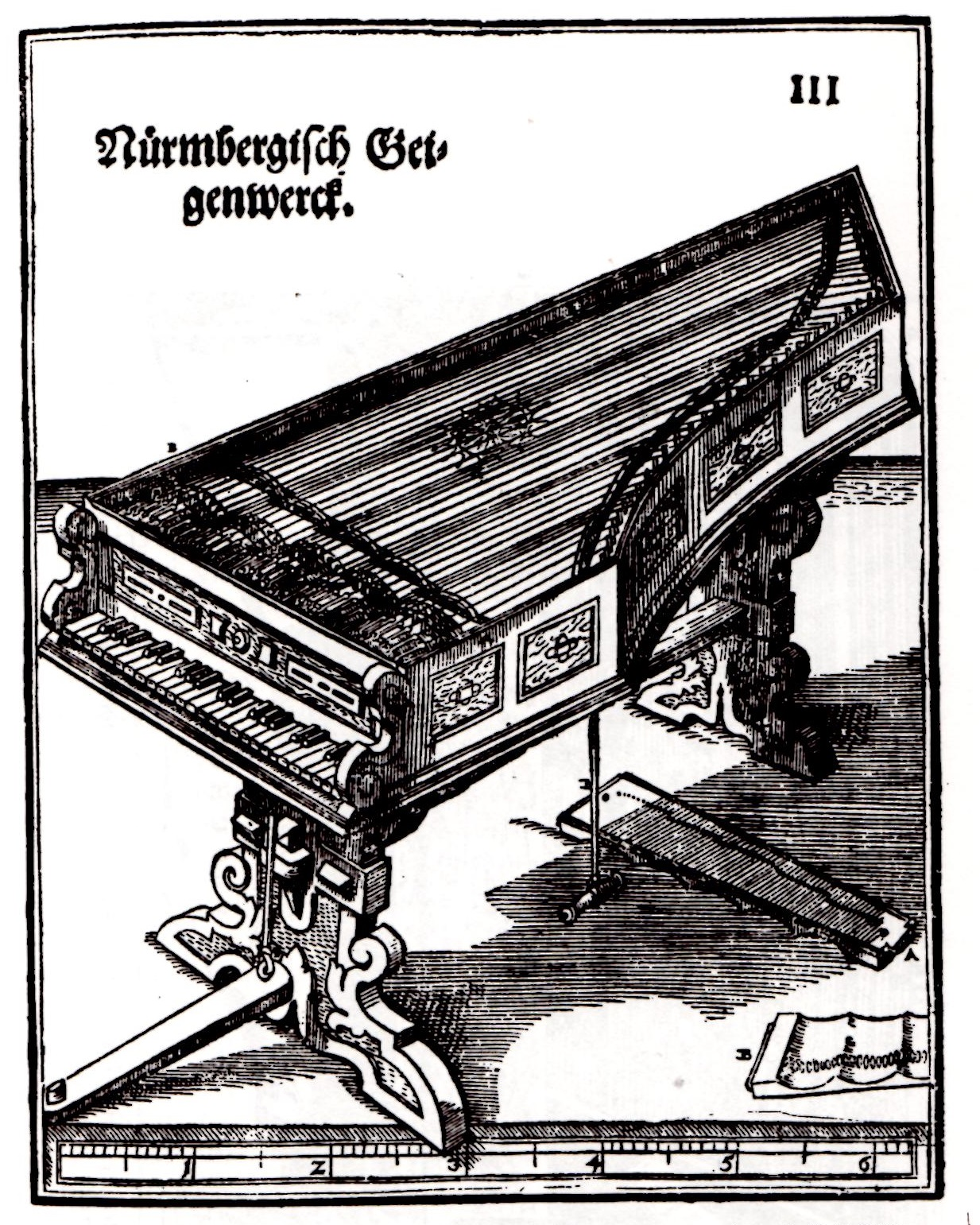
Bowed clavier - engraving from Syntagma Musicum by Michael Praetorius (1575)

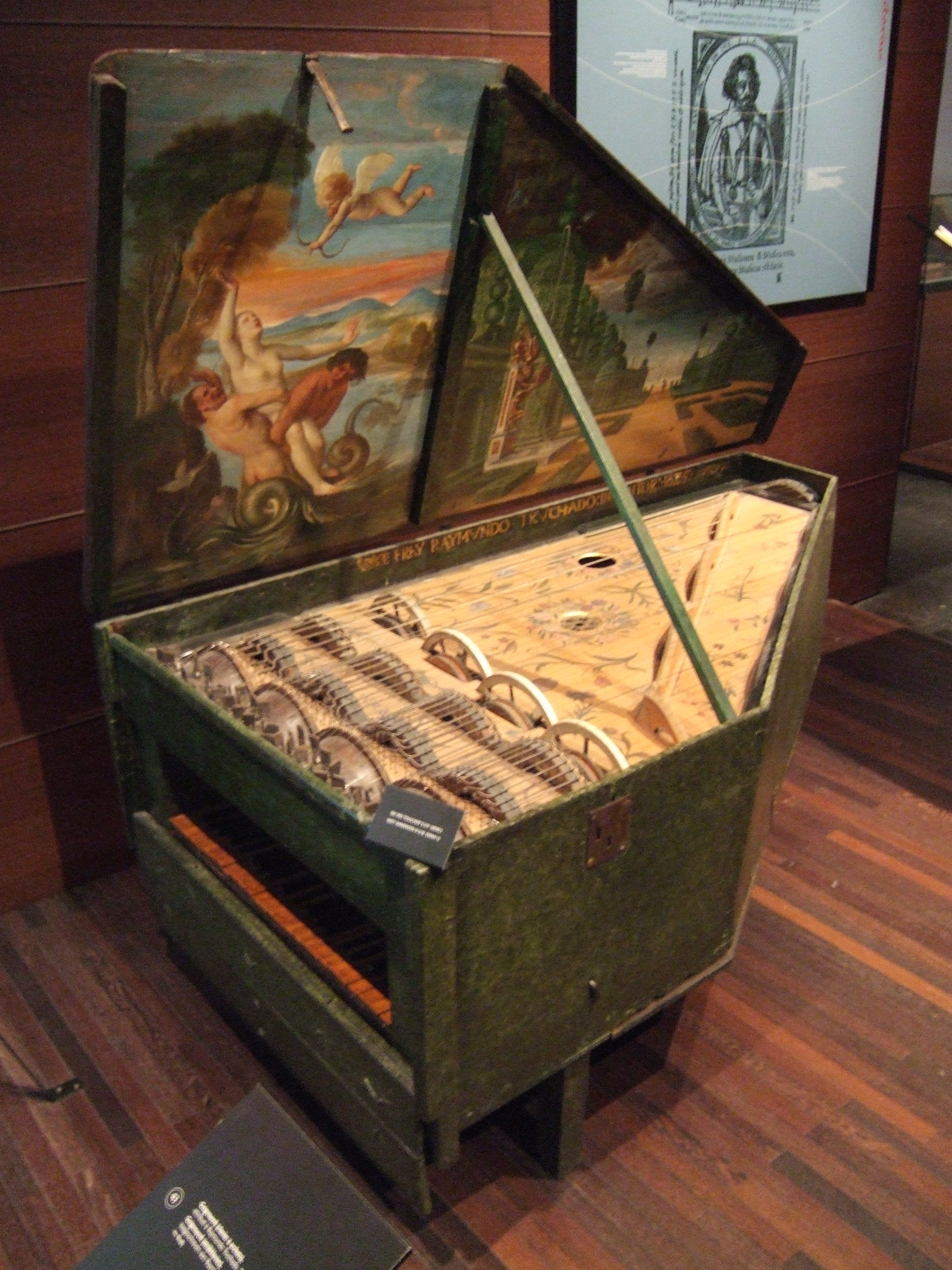
Bowed clavier (1625) by Raymundo Truchado - MIM Brussels

The bowed clavier (Bogenclavier, Streichklavier or Geigenwerk in German) is a keyboard instrument strung with gut strings, the tone of which is produced by a steadily revolving, well rosined cylinder powered by a foot pedal, a mechanism similar to that found in the hurdy-gurdy.

The Geigenwerck was illustrated and described by Michael Praetorius in his treatise on musical instruments Syntagma Musicum II, in the section De Organograhia, published 1614–20 in Germany.

It was re-invented by Joh. Hohlfeld of Berlin in 1751. This instrument and another one of his inventions, a device that recorded keyboard improvisations in real time, were mentioned in the "Essay on the True Art of Playing Keyboard Instruments" by C. P. E. Bach.

Another version was the klawiolin, designed by the Polish musician and painter Jan Jarmusiewicz (1781–1844). It was a hump-backed piano with gut strings and a mechanism controlling small bows which could imitate a string quartet.

== See also ==
- Viola organista
- Wheelharp
