= Ninera =

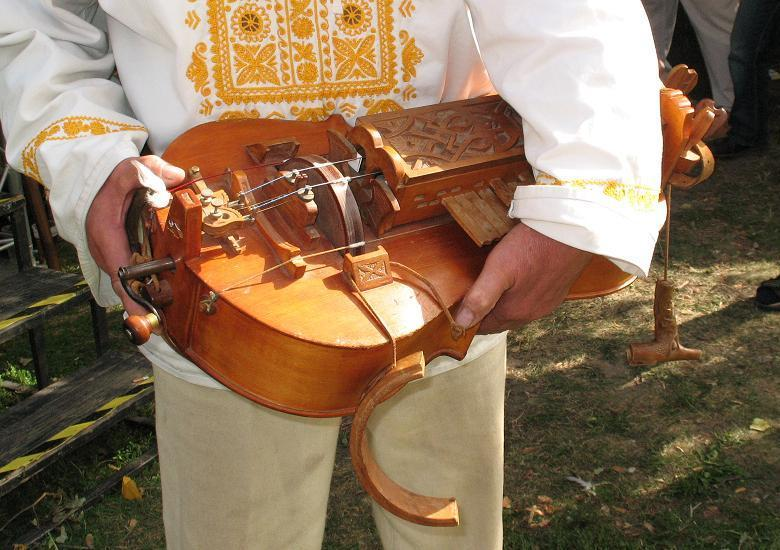

Ninera is the unique Slovak version of the hurdy-gurdy. One well-known ninera player in Slovakia is Tibor Koblicek, born in a small village of Turicky, near Cinobaňa in southern Slovakia.
