= Kaisatsuko =

Experimental musical instrument

The kaisatsuko (Japanese: 回擦胡, literally "wheel-bowed fiddle") is a mechanical experimental musical instrument invented by Yuichi Onoue of Tokyo, Japan.

The instrument consists of two strings on a fretless neck. A crank is affixed to a small nylon wheel mounted on the body. The player turns the crank, causing the wheel to spin and "bow" the strings. This concept is similar to that employed by the hurdy-gurdy. Unlike most hurdy-gurdies, Onoue's instrument has no keybox, but is fingered along the neck. This detail is similar to the dulcigurdy, a hurdy-gurdy variant recorded by Michael Praetorius.

Besides the Kaisatsuko Onoue also developed a 24-TET quarter tone tuning on his guitar as well as a deeply scalloped electric guitar for microtonal playing techniques.
