= Recordings featuring the hurdy-gurdy =

The following recordings and films feature music played on the hurdy-gurdy.

== Germany ==
- Patty Gurdy wrote and performed two tunes on the Carnival Row soundtrack.

== Ireland ==
- Throughout his career, Andy Irvine has played the hurdy-gurdy made for him in 1972 by Peter Abnett, an English instrument maker.

== Hungary ==
- Hurdy-gurdy is featured on albums As Above, So Below and Path by folk black metal artist Vvilderness.
