= Viola organista =

Musical instrument

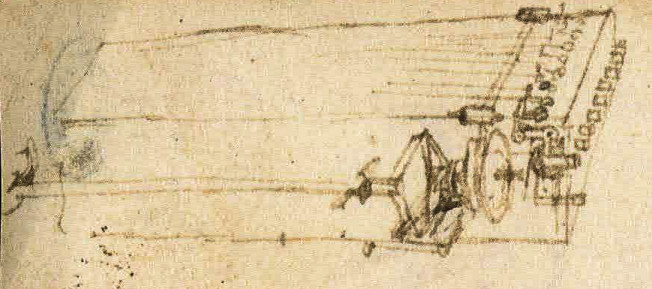
Viola organista (Codex Atlanticus, 1488–1489)

The viola organista is a musical instrument designed by Leonardo da Vinci. It uses a friction belt to vibrate individual strings (similar to how a violin produces sounds), with the strings selected by pressing keys on a keyboard (similar to an organ). Leonardo's design has intrigued instrument makers for more than 400 years, but though similar instruments have been built, no extant instrument constructed directly from Leonardo's incomplete designs is known. Sometimes it is mistakenly referred to as the harpsichord viola, which is a different instrument.

== Description ==
Leonardo designed many different and elaborate models of viola organista, as preserved in his notebooks of 1488–1489 and in the drawings in the Codex Atlanticus and Manuscript H.

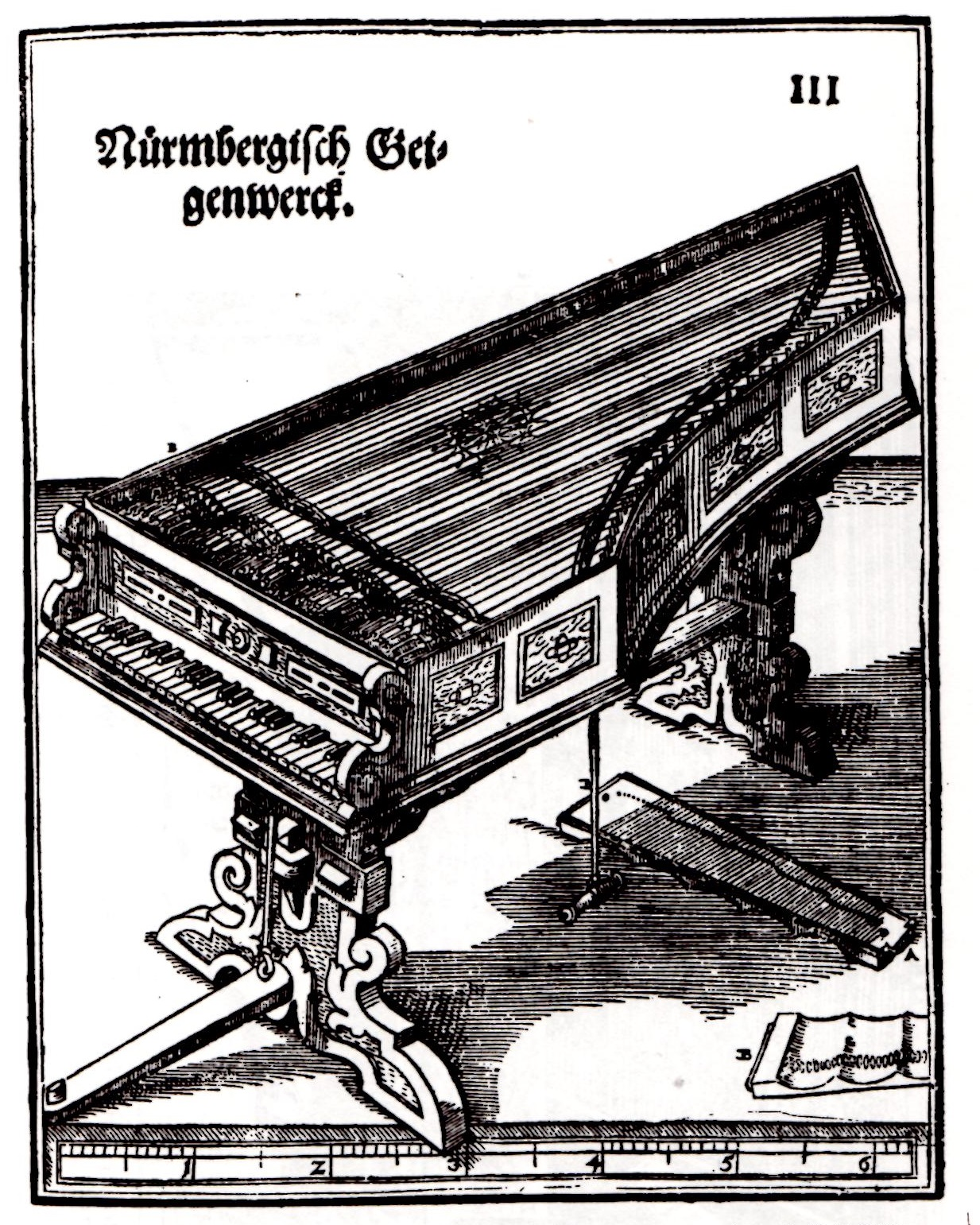
Geigenwerk - Etching from the Syntagma Musicum by Michael Praetorius (1620)

The first known instrument actually constructed using Leonardo's concept, is Hans Heyden's Geigenwerk of 1575. While the concept is the same, the design is very different; modern versions of the instrument have been more or less based on Heyden's design. An etching of the Geigenwerk from 1620 shows an instrument of about the stature and shape of a harpsichord (i.e., a piano-shape with flat sides and hard angles). The fully chromatic keyboard appears to have 44 keys, extending about three-and-a-half octaves from low E to a high B (see illustration). This keyboard range is consistent with harpsichords of the day, although harpsichord keyboards more typically started on low C or low F. The number of strings can't be directly determined, but the design implies one string per key, or 44 strings.

In the etching there appear to be five bow-wheels in the instrument, and a foot-pedal, presumably for turning the wheels. A scale given below the drawing has numbers from one to six; if it assumed these refer to feet, then the instrument is a bit over 6 feet long, which again is a scale in keeping with harpsichords of the day. The actual tuning of the instrument is not specified, but given the number of keys and the size of the instrument, it probably extended from around E2 to B5. Variations on this design have been produced over the past four centuries, with varying range, number of keys, and number of bow-wheels.

== Construction ==
It is not known if Leonardo ever built a working prototype of this instrument. The first similar instrument actually to be constructed was the Geigenwerk of 1575 by Hans Heyden, a German instrument inventor. However, the Geigenwerk is not based on Leonardo's designs. It uses several friction wheels instead of a friction belt to vibrate the strings, and requires two people to play it: one to turn the crank to put the rosined wheels in motion, and the other to work the keys.

Georg Gandi, an organist in Ilmenau, constructed a similar instrument with some improvements in 1709 and called it the piano viol. In 1741, two inventors – Le Voir in Paris and Hohlfeld in Berlin – independently constructed versions of a bowed piano, similar to Heyden's design. In 1754, a horsehair covering was added to the wheels of the bowed piano, which was termed the viola da gamba piano. Other instrument makers continued to improve the design through the remainder of the 18th and into the early 19th centuries, though it never became widespread or common.

These instruments remained primarily museum curiosities until a few modern instrument builders began to take an interest in creating reconstructions of the Geigenwerk, but calling them viola organista. Akio Obuchi built several instruments as early as 1993.

In 2013, Polish musician Sławomir Zubrzycki completed the construction of another modern replica of the Geigenwerk called viola organista and played it in performance at the Academy of Music in Kraków. Zubrzycki's instrument contains four bow-wheels (spun by a foot-pedal operated by the player), 61 keys, and a range extending from F1 to F6. In 2015, the musician Björk included this instrument – also played by Sławomir Zubrzycki – in a recording of the song "Black Lake" for the album Vulnicura Strings.

Another modern instrument similar in concept, if not design, is the wheelharp, created by Jon Jones and Mitchell Manger in 2013, and debuted at the NAMM Show that year, in Anaheim, California.

Another modern adaptation (a combination with a lute harp) is the Omniwerk, built by Prague-based harpsichord maker Jukka Ollika.

== See also ==
- List of works by Leonardo da Vinci
