= Vielle à roue et à manche =

Early western musical instrument

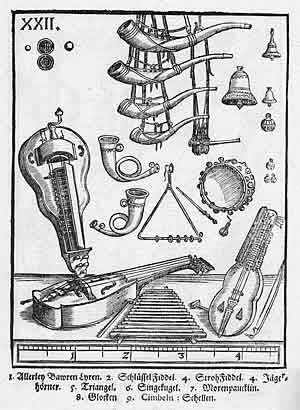
Dulcigurdy (lower left corner)

The vielle à roue et à manche (literally "Viola of the wheel and neck", called dulcigurdy by some luthiers) is a modern term for an early music instrument, of unknown original name, of the hurdy-gurdy family, but distinct in that the notes were changed by fingering the neck rather than pressing tangent keys. The instrument has several strings which are constantly bowed by a spinning wheel turned by a crank, producing unbroken musical notes.

The instrument is attested on Plate XXII of Praetorius' 1619 treatise Syntagma Musicum.

The term dulcigurdy is a modern one, a portmanteau of Appalachian dulcimer and hurdy-gurdy. The instrument has also been mislabeled strohfiddel in modern times, since the caption at the bottom of Plate XXII uses this term (literally "straw fiddle"), but that term actually refers to the xylophone pictured next to the dulcigurdy. Praetorius does not appear to give a specific name for the instrument, instead lumping it in with the keyed hurdy-gurdy next to it as Bauern-Lyren or "peasant lyres."

== Related instruments ==
- The kaisatsuko is a modern experimental instrument in Japan very similar in concept to the dulcigurdy.
