= History of lute-family instruments =

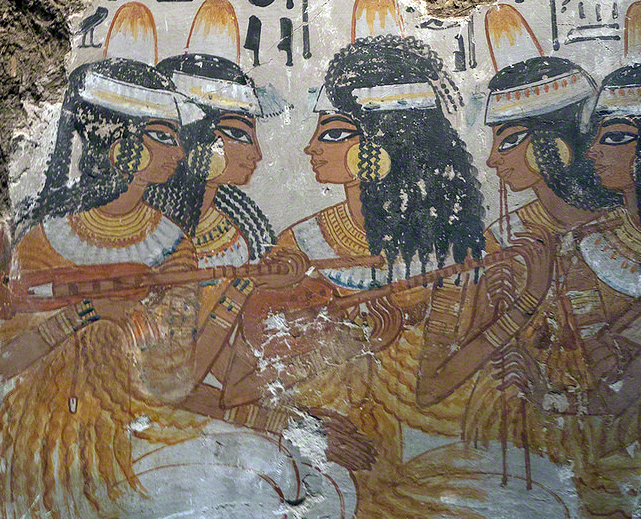
Ancient Egyptian tomb painting depicting players with long-necked, fretted lutes, 18th Dynasty (c. 1350 BC).

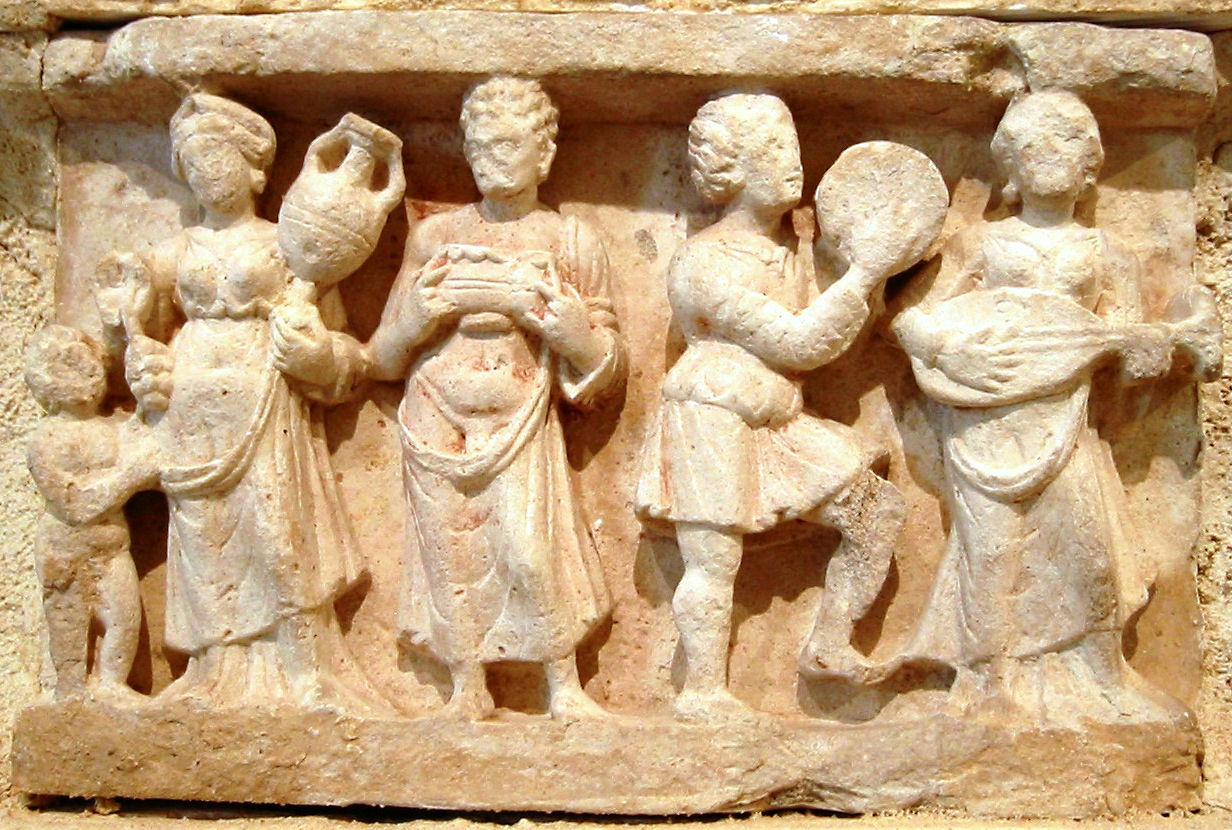
Hellenistic banquet scene from the 1st century AD, Hadda, Gandhara. Lute player with short-necked lute, far right.

Lutes are stringed musical instruments that include a body and "a neck which serves both as a handle and as a means of stretching the strings beyond the body".

The lute family includes not only short-necked plucked lutes such as the lute, oud, pipa, guitar, citole, gittern, mandore, rubab, and gambus and long-necked plucked lutes such as banjo, tanbura, bağlama, bouzouki, veena, theorbo, archlute, pandura, sitar, tanbur, setar, but also bowed instruments such as the yaylı tambur, rebab, erhu, and the entire family of viols and violins.

Lutes either rose in ancient Mesopotamia prior to 3100 BC or were brought to the area by ancient Semitic tribes. The lutes were pierced lutes; long-necked lutes with a neck made from a stick that went into a carved or turtle-shell bowl, the top covered with skin, and strings tied to the neck and instrument's bottom.

Curt Sachs, a musical historian, placed the earliest lutes at about 2000 BC in his 1941 book The History of Musical Instruments. This date was based on the archaeological evidence available to him at that time. The discovery of an apparent lute on an Akkadian seal, now in the British Museum, may have pushed the known existence of the plucked lute back to c. 3100 BC.

The lute's existence in art was more plain between 2330–2000 BC (the 2nd Uruk period), when the art had sufficient detail to show the instrument clearly. The instrument spread among the Hittites, Elamites, Assyrians, Mari, Babylonians and Hurrians. By c. 1500 BC the lute had reached Egypt, through conquest, and it had reached Greece by 320 BC both through Egypt and eastern neighbors. The lute spread eastward as well; long lutes today are found everywhere from Europe to Japan and south to India.

The short lute developed in Central Asia or Northern India in areas that had connection to Greece, China, India and the Middle East through trade and conquest. The short wood-topped lute moved east to China (as the pipa), south to India (as the vina), and west to the Middle East, Africa and Europe as the barbat and oud. From these two, and from skin topped lutes known today as rubabs and plucked fiddles, instruments developed in Europe.

Europeans had access to lutes in several ways. Foreign sources came in through Byzantium, Sicily and Andalusia. In the non-literate period, they apparently experimented with locally made instruments which were referenced in documents from the Carolingian Renaissance. This was overwhelmed by incoming instruments and Europeans developed whole families of lutes, both plucked and bowed.

Lute-family instruments penetrated from East and Southeast Asia through Central Asia and the Middle East, through North Africa, Europe and Scandinavia. These days, lute-family instruments are used worldwide.

== Potential precursors to lutes ==
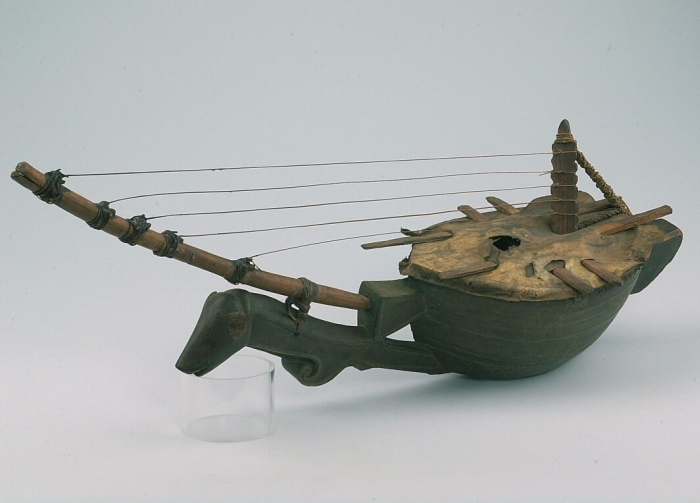
Bow harp or harp lute, West Africa

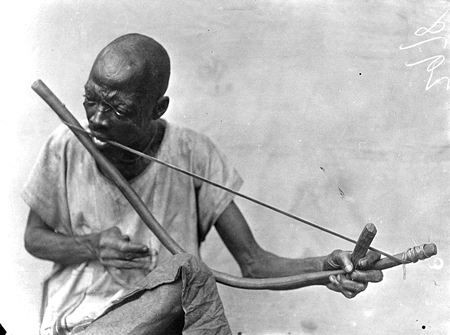
Musical bows have survived in some parts of Africa.

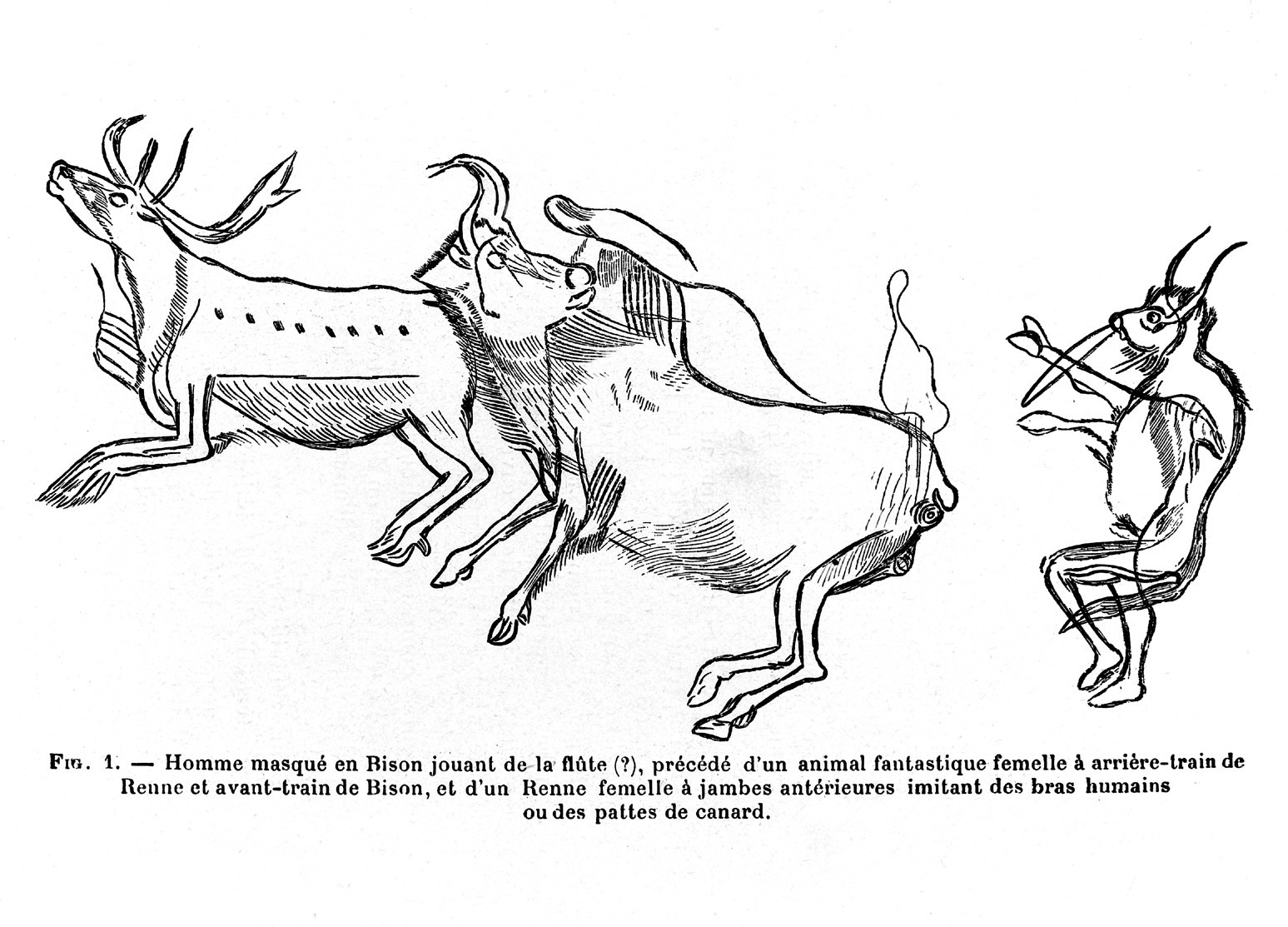
Figure on wall whose bow(?) has been thought of as possibly musical.

=== Theory ===
In theory, families of musical instruments descend from the musical bow.

Henri Breuil surveyed the Trois Frères caves in France and made an engraving that attempted to reproduce a c. 13,000 BC cave painting into a black-and-white lithograph engraving. His engraving showed a mysterious figure, a "man camouflaged to resemble a bison", in the midst of a mass of herd-animals, "herding the beasts and playing the musical bow". The artwork is confused, and those who are trying to reproduce the art in color have had to work to bring out legible images. One interpretation of the "magician-hunter" image considers his hunting-bow to be a musical bow, used as a single-stringed musical instrument.

Whether the bow in the cave illustration is a musical instrument or the hunting tool in a Paleolithic hunt, musicologists have considered the idea that the bow could be a possible relative or ancestor to chordophones, the lutes lyres, harps and zither families. Curt Sachs said that there was good reason not to consider hunters' bows as likely musical bows. One reason was that the oldest known musical bows were 10 feet long, useless for hunting, and that "musical bows were not associated with hunters' beliefs and ceremonies".

Sachs considered the musical bows important, however. He pointed out that the name for the Greek lute, pandûra was likely derived from pan-tur, a Sumerian word meaning "small bow". He considered this evidence in support of the theory that the musical bow was ancestral to the pierced lute.

The bows used for music required a resonator, a hollowed object like a bowl, a gourd or a musician's mouth, in order to produce audible sound. Although the musical bow could be manipulated to produce more than one tone instruments were developed from it that used one note per string. Since each string played a single note, adding strings added new notes for instrument families such as bow harps, harps and lyres. In turn, this led to being able to play dyads and chords. Another innovation occurred when the bow harp was straightened out and a bridge used to lift the strings off the stick-neck, creating the lute.

=== Theory disputed ===
This picture of musical bow to harp bow is theory and has been contested. In 1965 Franz Jahnel wrote his criticism stating that the early ancestors of plucked instruments are not currently known. He felt that the harp bow was a long cry from the sophistication of the 4th-millennium BC civilization that took the primitive technology and created "technically and artistically well-made harps, lyres, citharas and lutes".

== Long-necked lutes ==
Earliest images of lute were mainly long-necked lutes

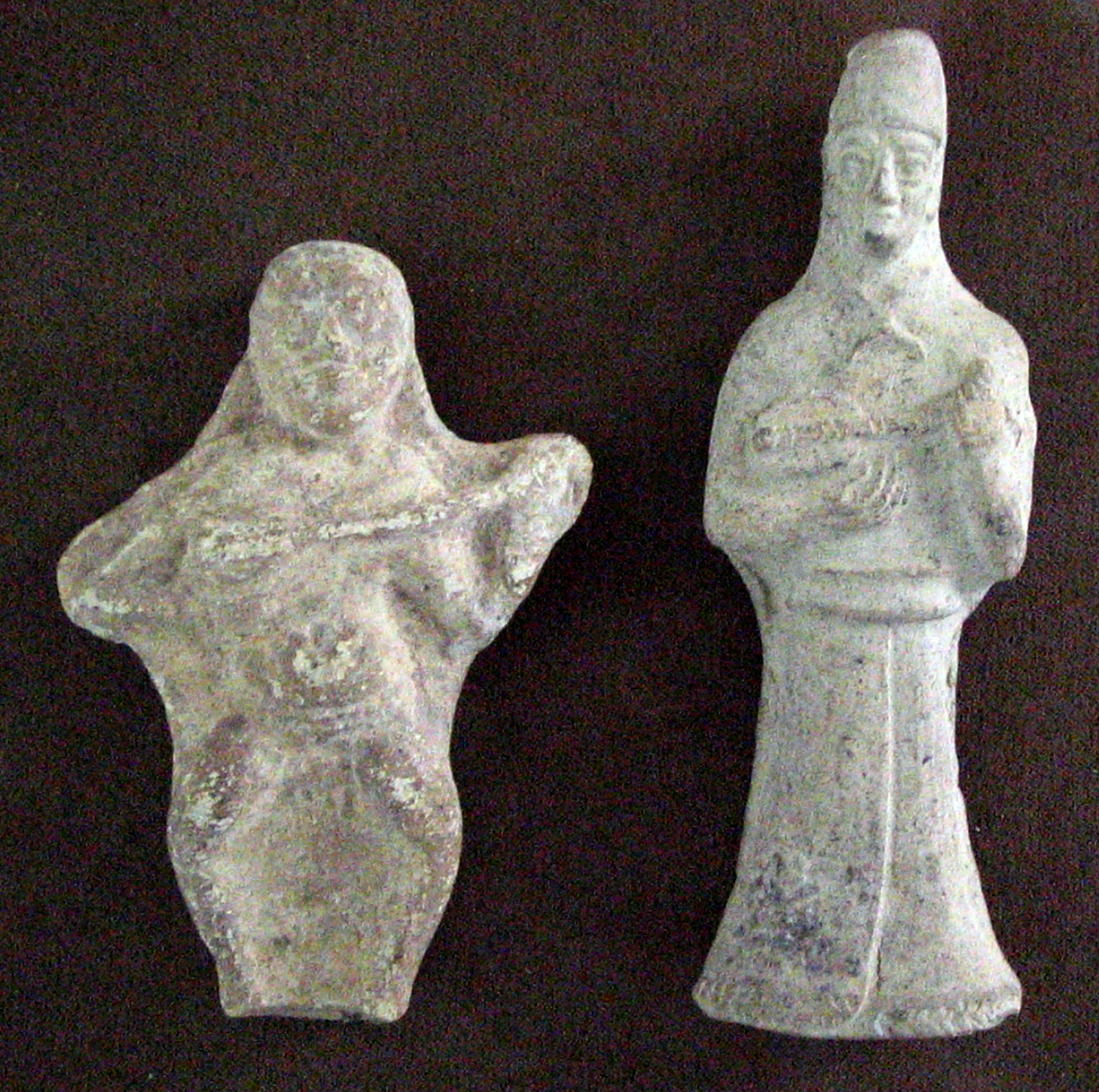
Elamite long-necked lute (left) and short-necked lute from the first half of the 2nd millennium BC found at Susa.

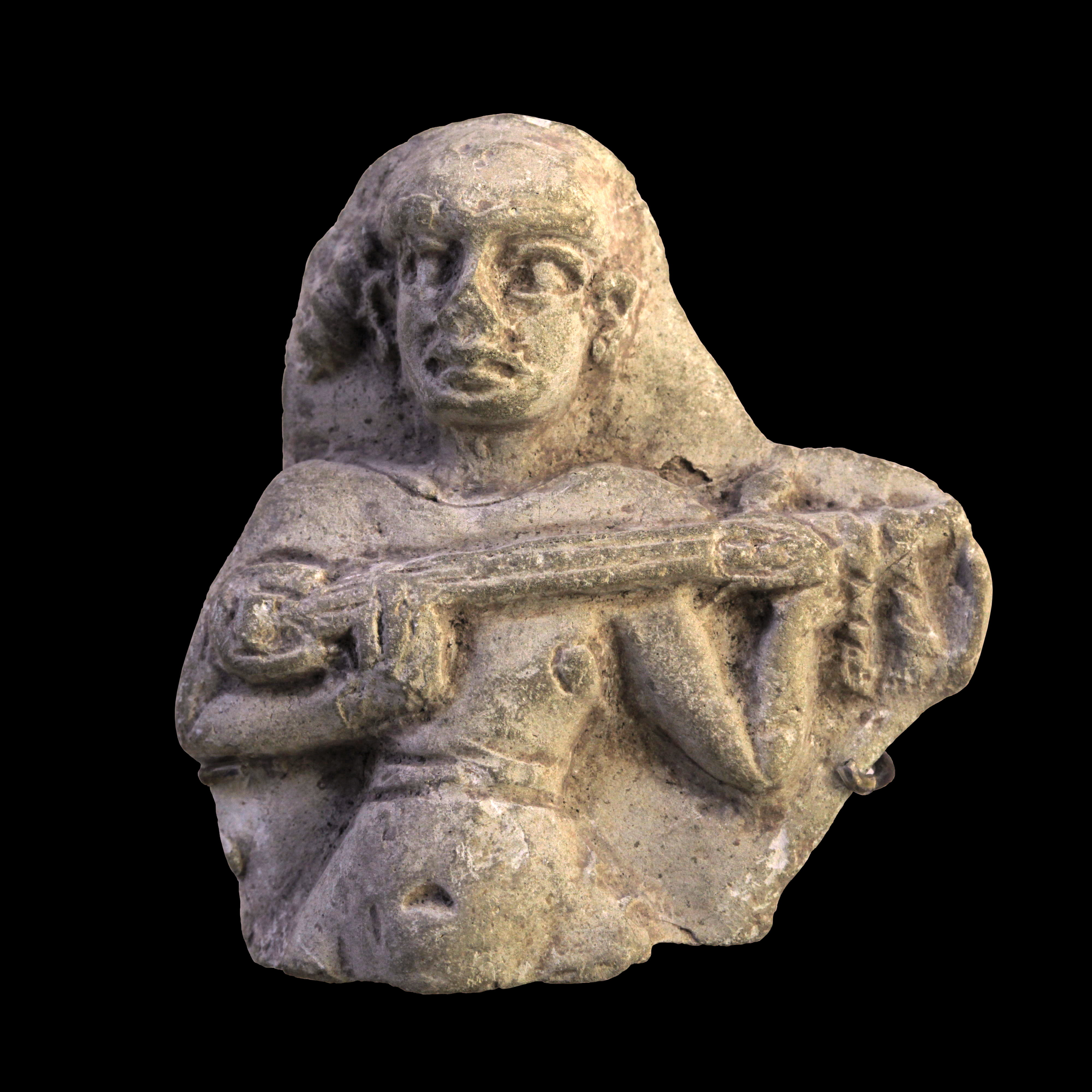
Elamite long-necked lute, 1500-1100 BC. There were no pegs to hold strings. Strings were wrapped with cords at the end of the neck. Each tassel indicates a string that is secured.)

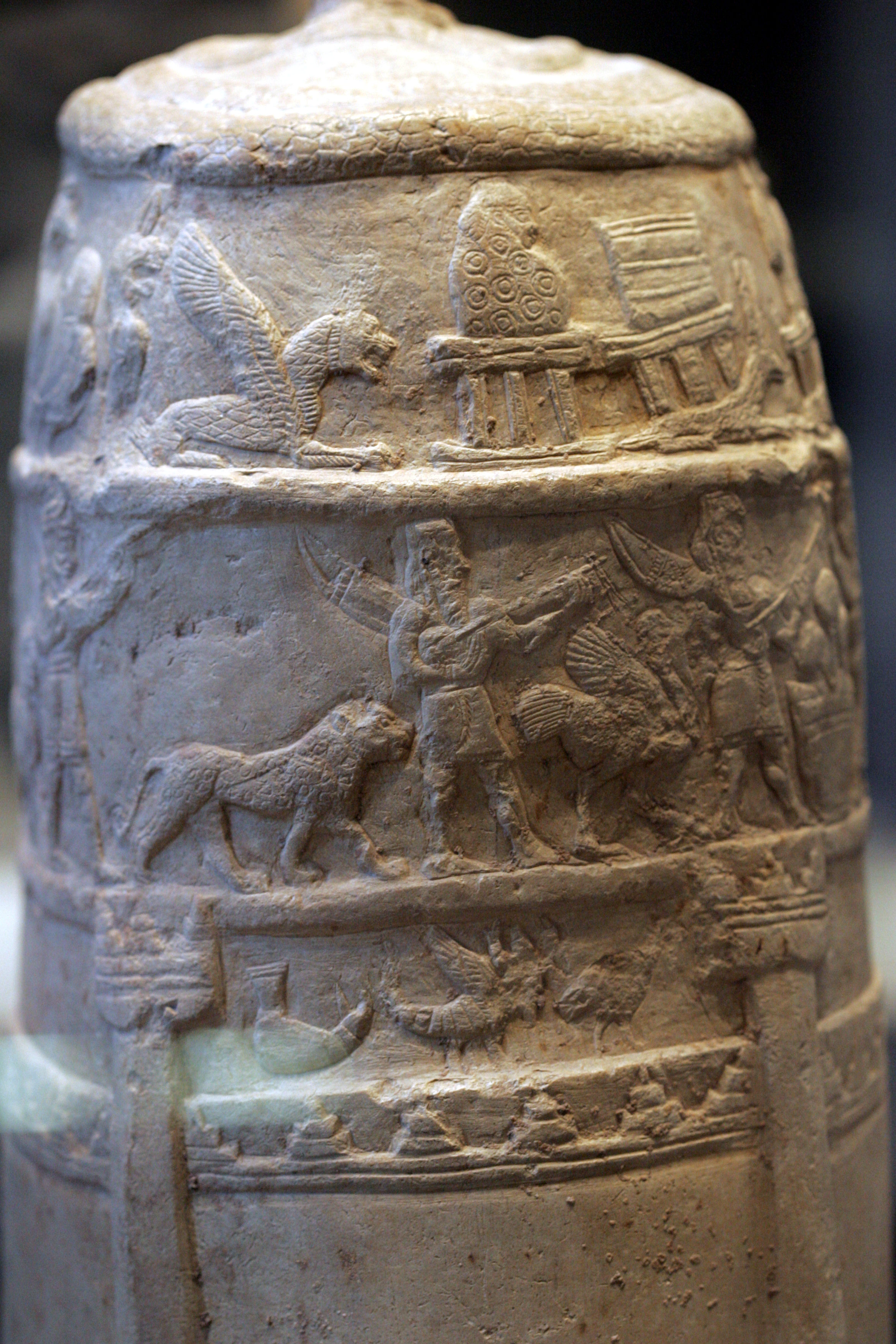
1186-1172 BC. Kassite kudurru showing long-necked lute. Tassels visible. Discovered in Susa, where it was carried as a war trophy.

The earliest lute image dates back to a carved seal, made before 3000 BC. Before that image was acquired by the British Museum, the earliest lute images were on carved seals dating back to between 2334 and 2000 BC. These were lutes with long necks (compared to the lutes' bodies), as were most lutes depicted in the 3000 years BC. A few instruments in Dumbrill's book have necks which are shorter, or have wide bodies without distinct necks, short lutes.

The most ancient lutes had long necks. These survived into the modern era as the tanbur, which Sachs said "faithfully preserved the outer appearance of the ancient lutes of Babylonia and Egypt". Sachs, one of those who created the widespread system of musical instrument classification idea today, categorized long lutes with a "pierced lute" and "long neck lute". The pierced lute had a neck made from a stick that pierced the body (as in the ancient Egyptian long-neck lutes, and the modern African gunbrī). The long lute had an attached neck, and included the sitar, tanbur and tar (dutār 2 strings, setār 3 strings, čatār 4 strings, pančtār 5 strings).

Musicologist Richard Dumbrill today uses the word lute more categorically to discuss instruments that existed millennia before the term "lute" was coined. Dumbrill documented more than 3000 years of iconographic evidence for the lutes in Mesopotamia, in his book The Archaeomusicology of the Ancient Near East. According to Dumbrill, the lute family included instruments in Mesopotamia prior to 3000 BC. He points to a cylinder seal as evidence; dating from c. 3100 BC or earlier (now in the possession of the British Museum) the -seal depicts on one side what is thought to be a woman playing a stick "lute". Like Sachs, Dumbrill saw length as distinguishing lutes, dividing the Mesopotamian lutes into a long variety and a short. His book does not cover the shorter instruments that became the European lute, beyond showing examples of shorter lutes in the ancient world. He focuses on the longer lutes of Mesopotamia, various types of necked chordophones that developed throughout ancient world: Greek, Egyptian (in the Middle Kingdom), Iranian (Elamite and others), Hittite, Roman, Bulgar, Turkic, Indian, Chinese, Armenian/Cilician cultures. He names among the long lutes, the pandura and the tanbur

Experts who study the people from ancient civilizations in Mesopotamia region argue as to which people the long-necked people originated. Candidates include "East Semites" of Akkad, peoples in Elam and "West Semites". The instrument was probably distributed by the Hittites, Hurrians and Kassites, rather than invented by them.

Examples from 2334 to 2000 BC (Uruk period 3) exist from Ischali, Eshnunna (Tell Asmar), Kish, Mesopotamia, Iran, Iraq, Tello, Susa. Later examples exist from 2000 to 1500 BC (Uruk period 4). Examples were found in Khafajah, Mari, Isin or Larsa, Iran, Babylon, Tell Mamabaqat Syria, Susa, and Alaca Huyuk. In period 5 from 1500 to 1000 BC, the Egyptians acquired the lute and their art also contributed to our knowledge, as well as actual lutes found in graves.

=== Prehistoric roots in Sumer, westward to Egypt ===
A tradition of singing and dancing girls, wine, women and song

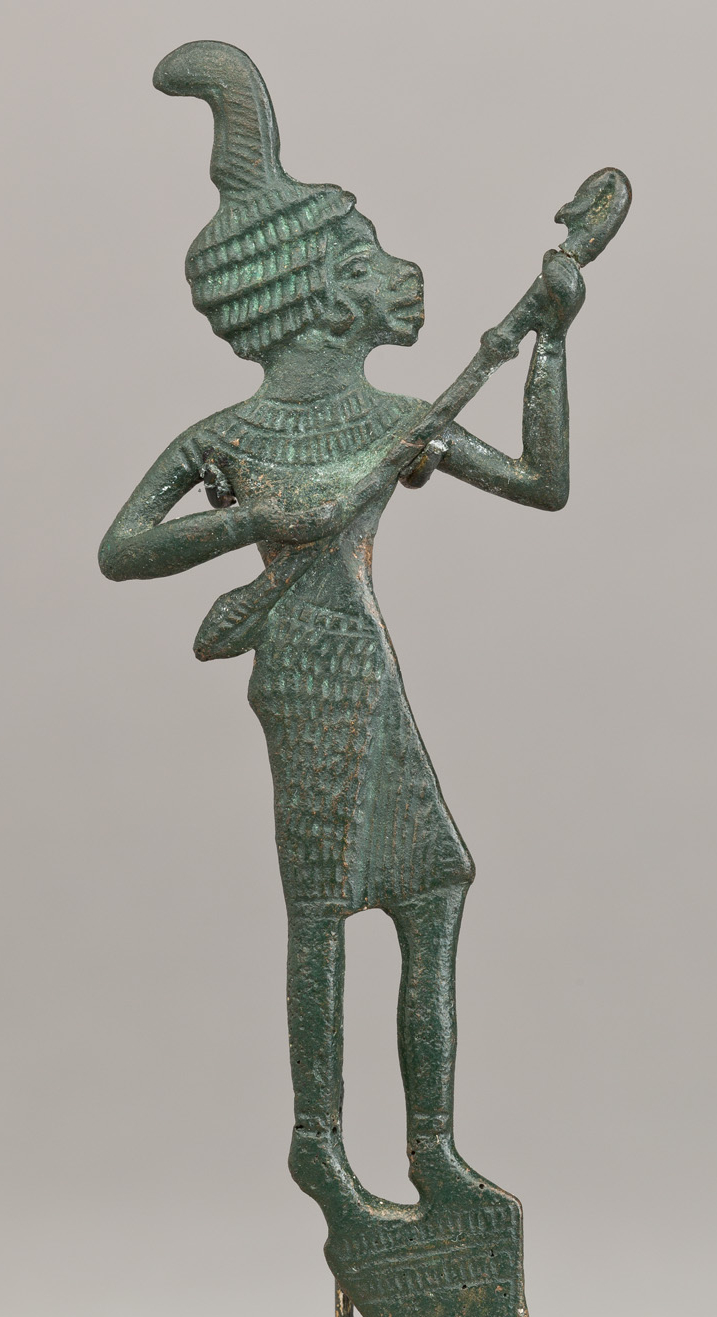
Egyptian lute, 18th Dynasty, 1390–1295 BC

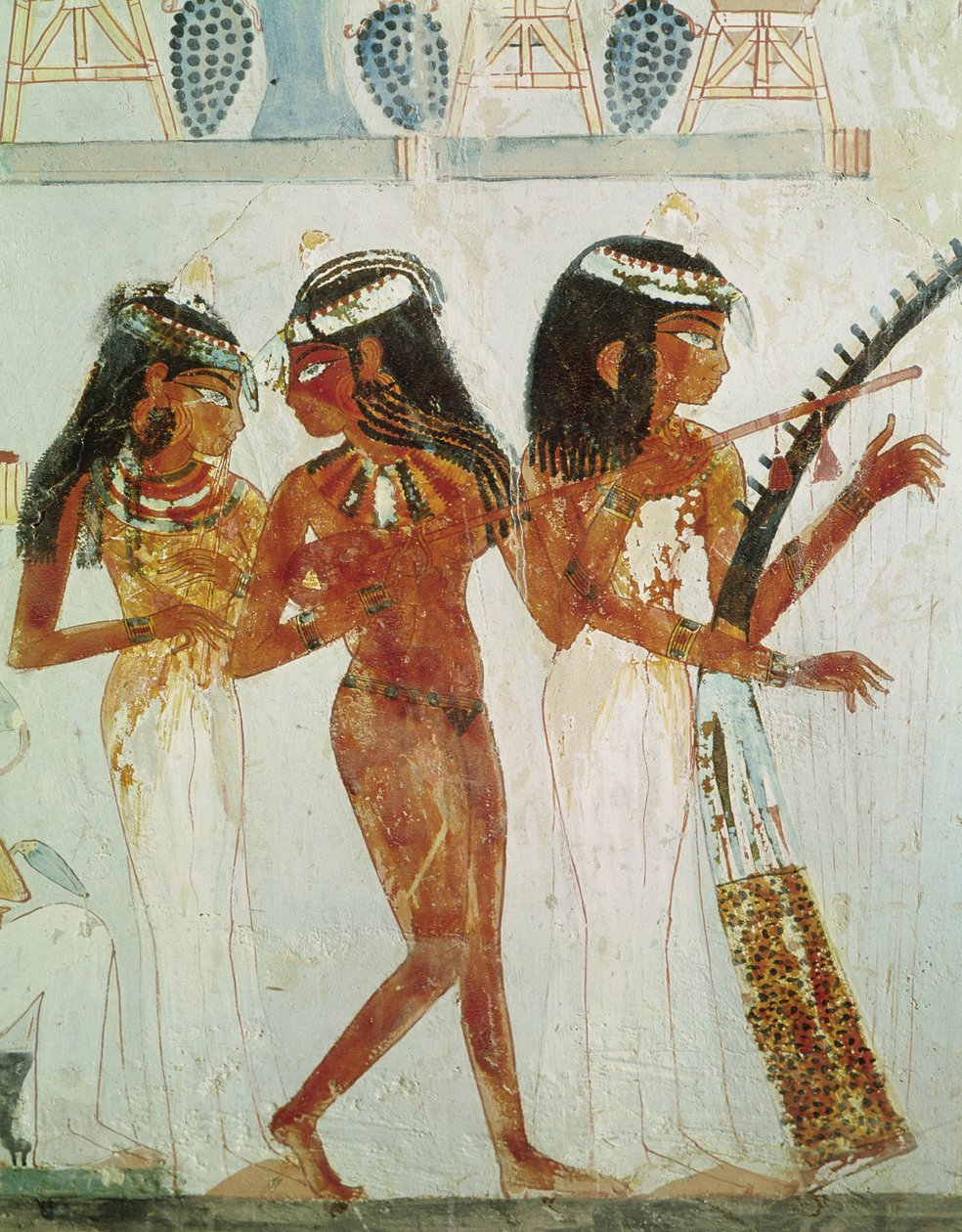
Three musicians, Tomb of Nakht, Thebes, 18th Dynasty, 1422–1411 BC. The lute-player's lute has two strings (indicated by tassels) and lines where frets are on modern instruments.

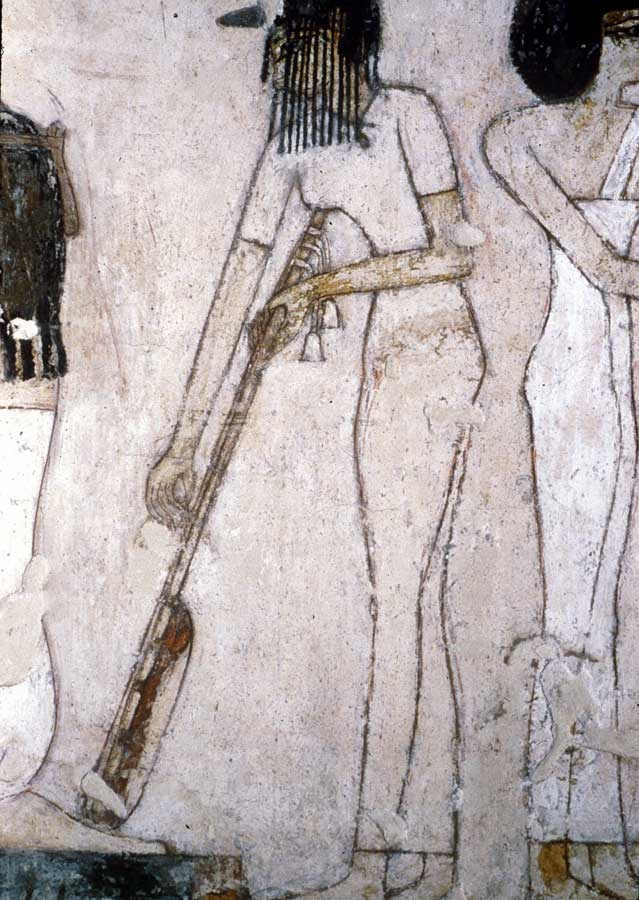
Musician tuning her lute, pulling the string upward from below while the hand at the top secures the tension. Tomb of Rekhmire, 18th Dynasty.

From China to Central Asia and India to Egypt, artwork shows women entertaining with music and alcohol.

Egypt— The Egyptians acquired the lute with singing and dancing girls, as tribute from conquered territories, shown in a 1422 BC painting. The tradition of exchanging female performers between countries was long lived.

China— In China, more than 11,000 slaves specializing in entertainment—including music dance and instrumentals—had their own section in the capital, Changan, during the Tang dynasty (618–960 AD) Slaves were among the most commonly traded commodity carried by merchants on the Silk Road and their numbers included dancers and musicians.

Arabia, Persia and Islamic Countries— The commerce in singing girls (qiyan) between the countries of the Near East, accompanied by their instruments, gave music an "international, interoriental character", which blended as Islam spread from the Malayan Archipelago in Asia to Spain. Under both the Umayyads and Abbasids they were "highly accomplished, not only in music, but in other departments of culture" and trained in schools by virtuosi. In the "Days of Idolatry" among the Arabs, singing girls were common, into the era of Muhammad (570–632 AD) They were part of "the household of every Arab of social standing", and "attached to the taverns for the entertainment of the visitors". In the 430s AD, Persian king Bahram Ghur visited the court of the Ghassanids, where he listened to girls from the Byzantine Empire and from Al-Hira sing music from their homes, accompanied by the barbat, a Central Asian instrument. The instruments accompanying the singers "lost their regional character" by the 7th century AD. It should be pointed out that not all the women singing and playing lutes were slaves. Although used by Persian royalty in the days before Muhammed, the harem was not part of the Bedouin culture at that time, and free women "joined in the music of the family or tribal festivities with their instruments". It was a time of the "badawī Arab". A secular people then, for them "love, wine, gambling, hunting, the pleasure of song and romance ... wit and wisdom" were all important.

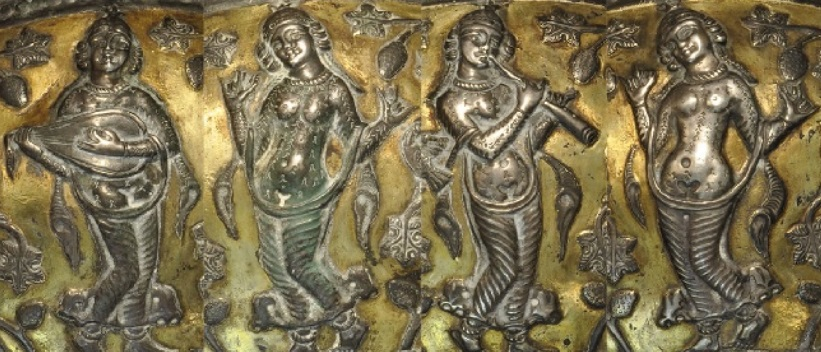
Entertainers on a Sassanian bowl, 5th to 7th centuries AD. Lute player (far left).

Sumerians, Babylonians, Kassites, Assyrians, Persians, Greeks all ruled the Mesopotamian area between Tigris and Euphrates rivers where the earliest examples of lutes have survived in clay and stone artwork. Sachs described the Mesopotamian lutes as having "very small bodies, long necks with many frets, two strings attached without pegs and were played with a plectron". The long lute entered Egypt after its conquest of Southwest Asia, when it began receiving tribute in the form of "singing and dancing-girls with their instruments", illustrated in paintings at Tell El-Amarna.

The paintings of the Egyptian lutes are detailed enough to provide a better understanding of ancient long lutes. Furthermore, original lutes survived in tombs, some still with strings attached. The Egyptian pierced-lutes had a carved wooden bowl for the instrument's body, "usually oval", covered with rawhide. A stick which acted as the instrument's neck pierced the instrument's body. The stick was threaded through cuts in the top of the rawhide to the end of the bowl. It was attached to the strings through a "triangular opening cut in the skin" at the bottom of the bowl. Besides being woven through the skin-soundboard, the stick was supported underneath by "wooden crosspieces" that ran crosswise underneath the stick, to the edges of the bowl on either side. The strings were "wound around the top of the handle" and tied with thongs, the tassels visible in some surviving artwork.

Nora E. Scott gave more details about the Egyptian lute's construction, saying that the lute that belonged to Har-Mose, 1500 BC, had two bridges, the triangular bridge at the bottom, attached to the stick and protruding through the skin, and another on the neck. The string passed over the second bridge and was tied down to the neck with linen cord to keep its tension. The player tuned the lute by pulling the string tight over the second bridge and tightening the linen cord to hold. The second bridge corresponds in function to the nut on a guitar or mandolin. The soundboard skin could have as many as six soundholes.

Sachs points out one significant difference between the Egyptian lutes and other pierced lutes of the ancient world. The non-Egyptian lutes had a stick handle piercing the bowl on both ends (spike lutes), rather than having one end resting inside the bowl (tang lutes). He also gave consideration to African skin-topped instruments that survived into the 20th century, noting that those in Morocco and Senegambia, such as the gunbri, might be descendants. He said the instruments "degenerated" from the Egyptian instruments, but then were developed after the Arab conquest of North Africa. Other differences he noted include different body shapes, attaching strings to "lateral pegs" (rather than tying strings directly to the neck) and reducing the instrument's size.

==== Gallery: ancient long-necked lutes ====
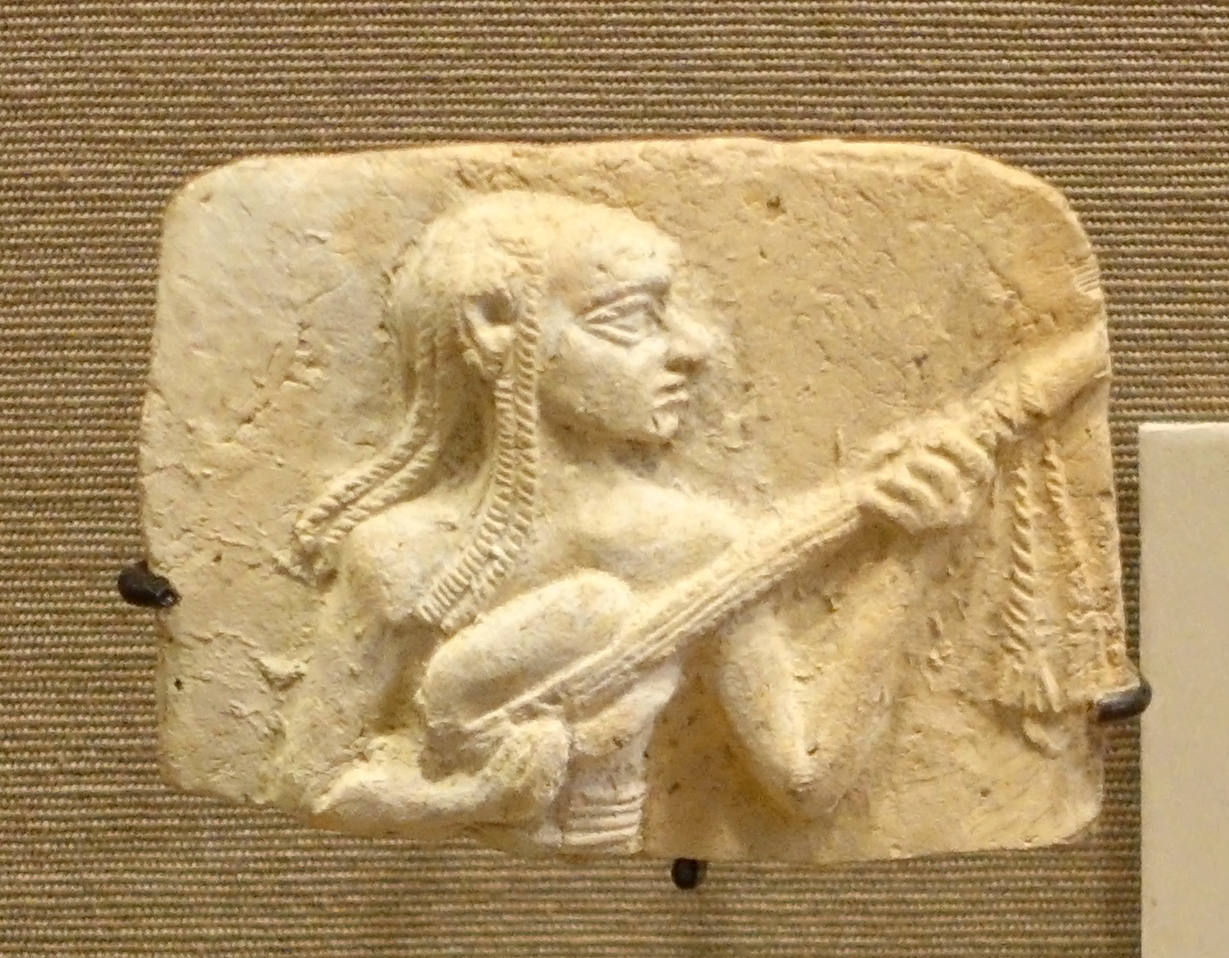
Iraq. Musician playing a lute, Tell Ishchali, Isin-Larsa period, 2000-1600 BC, baked clay. Hanging tassels are part of harness to hold strings, one for each string.

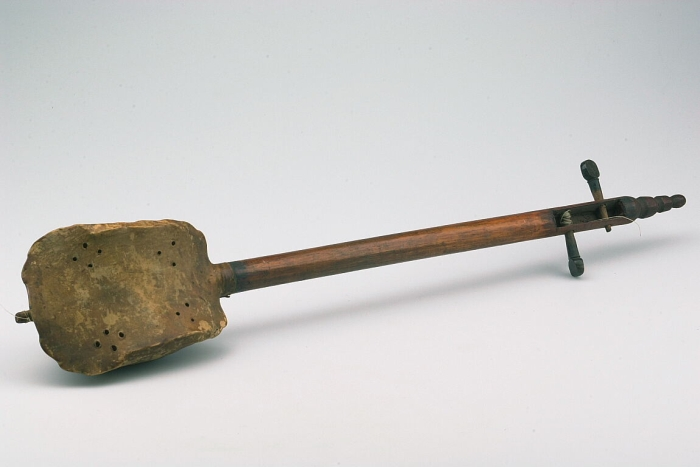
Modern lute, with same shape as Tell Ishchali lute. Bowl is a river-turtle shell. Also has similar sound holes, size and shape as Byzantine pandura. Egypt, pre-1930.

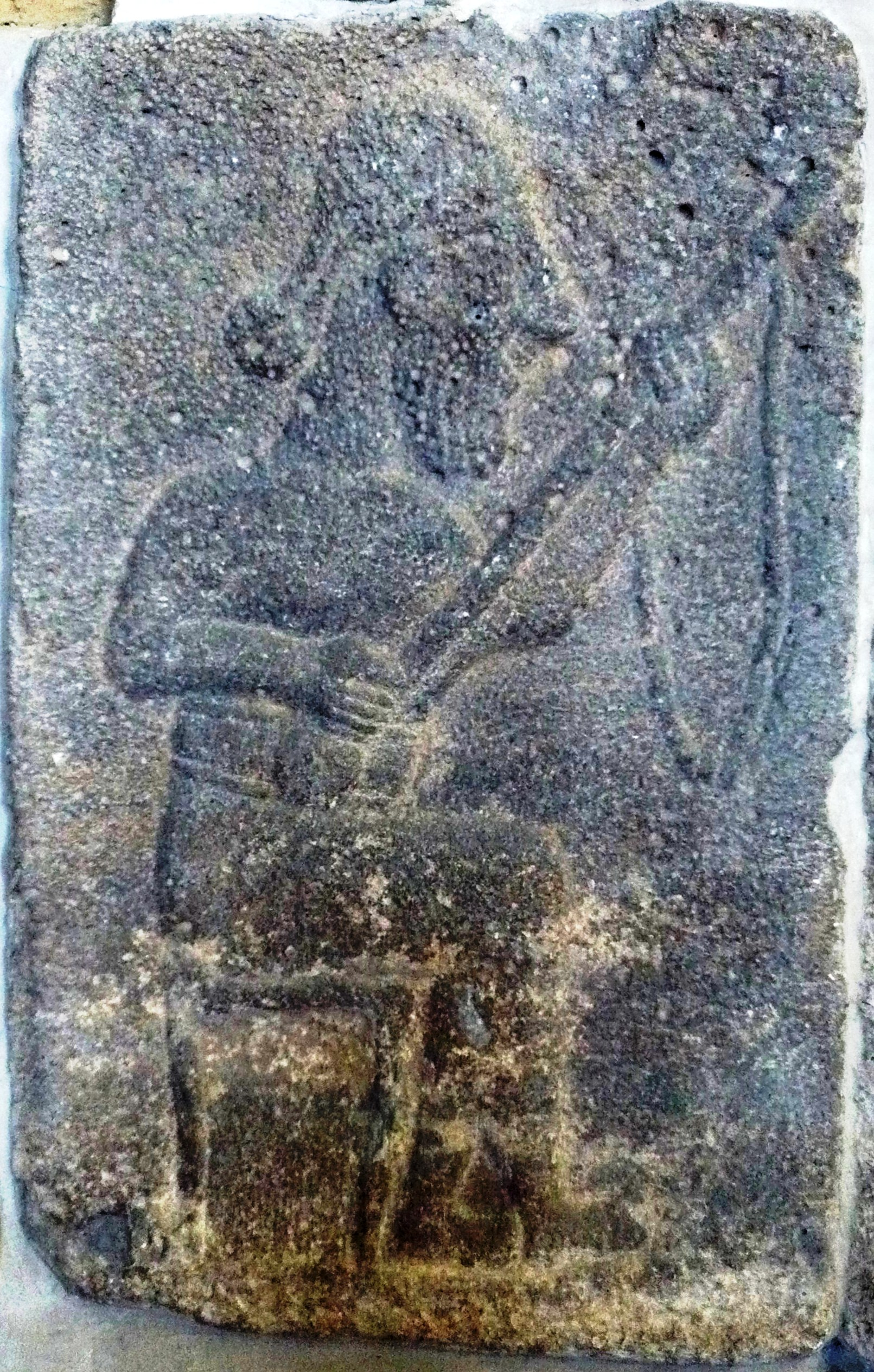
Lute in art found at Zincirli Höyük, 10th-9th century BC, at the Pergamom museum, Berlin.

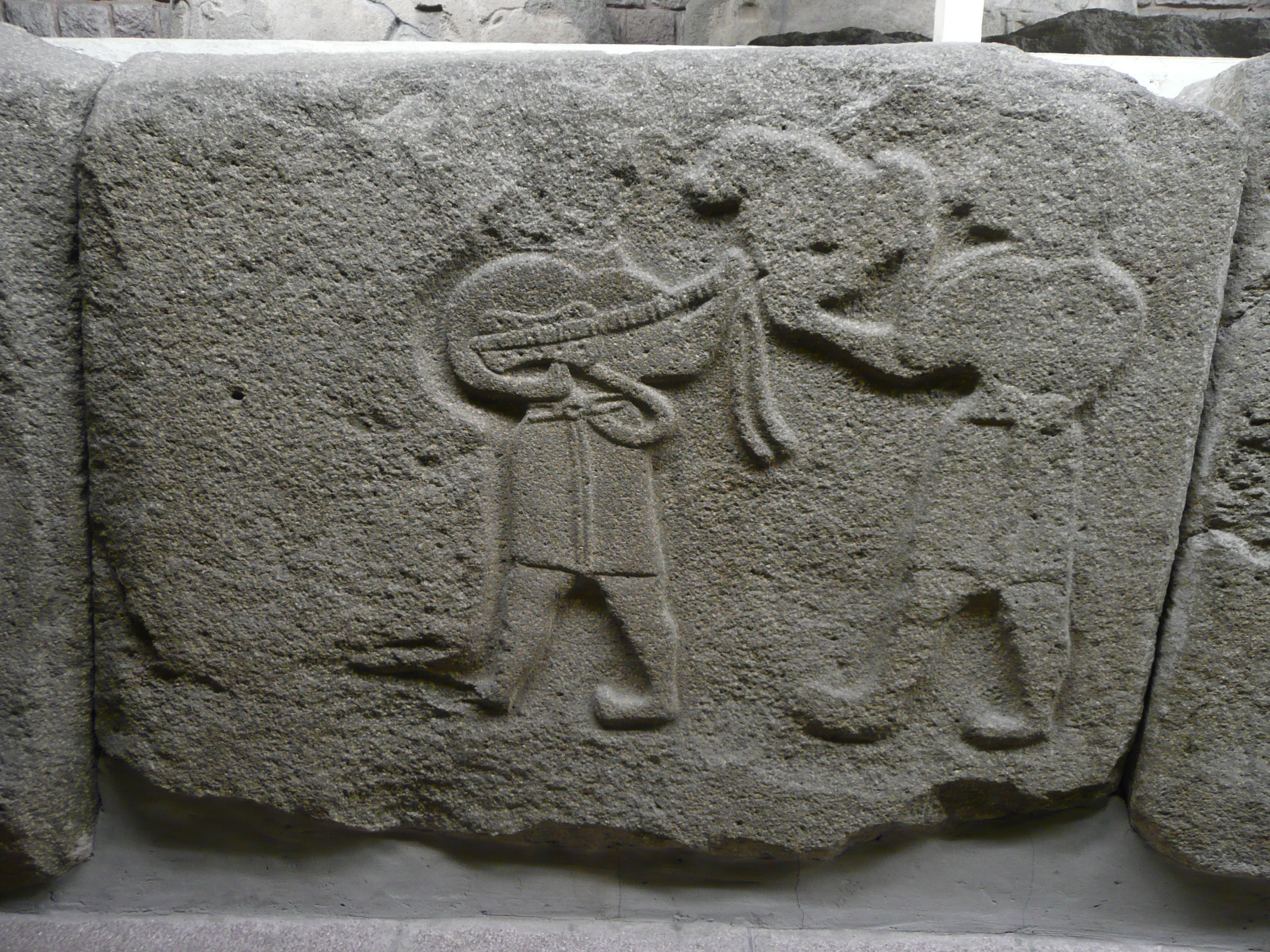
Alacahöyük 1399–1301 BC, Hittite lute with in-curved sides, and frets on neck. Built like the Egyptian (skin top, stick woven through skin, sound holes parallel to stick-neck, one tassel to tie each string.). Unlike Egyptian lutes, stick pokes out at both ends).

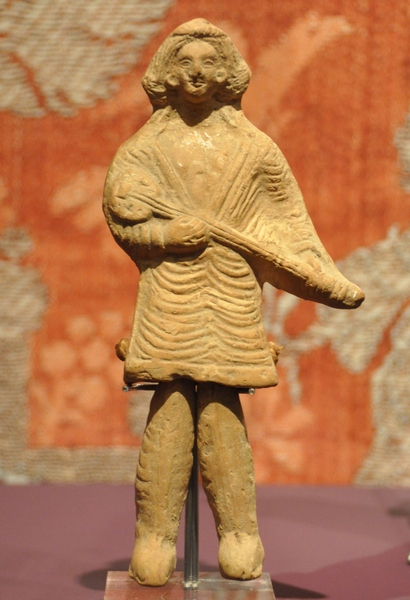
Parthian Empire, long-necked lute or tanbur, c. 3 BC – 3 AD. Neck ends within body.

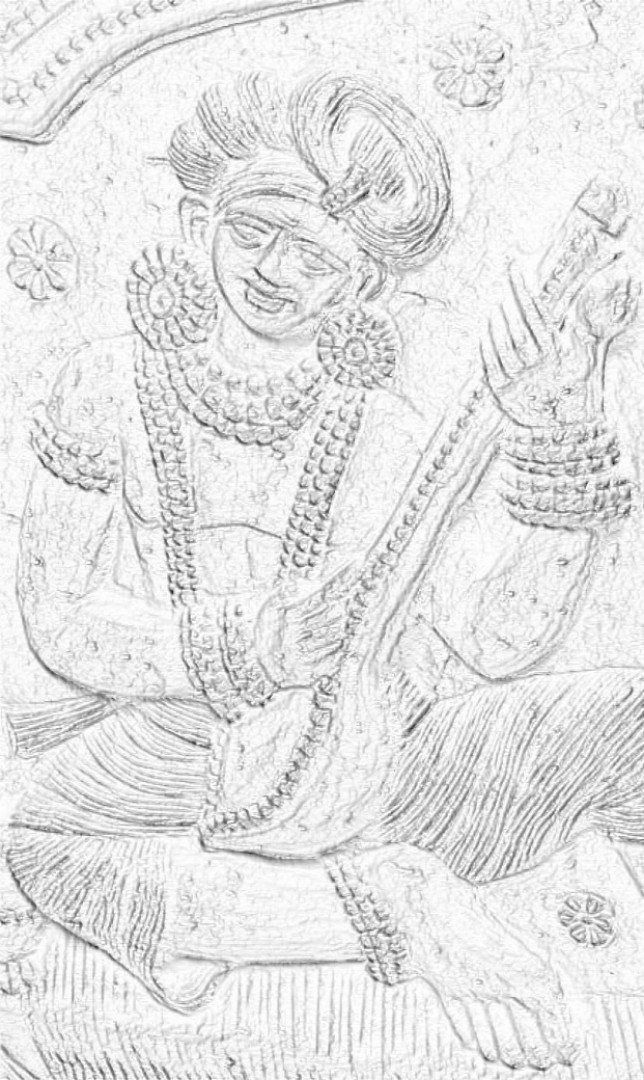
Indian lute, Bengal, Shunga period, 2nd century B.C.

=== Greece and Rome, pandura ===
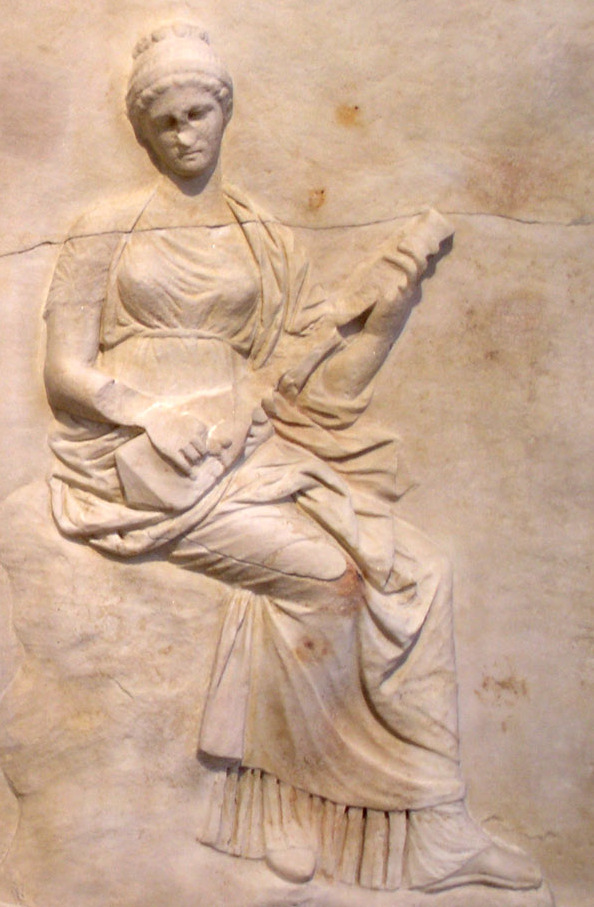
Pandura at Mantineia, c. 330–320 BC

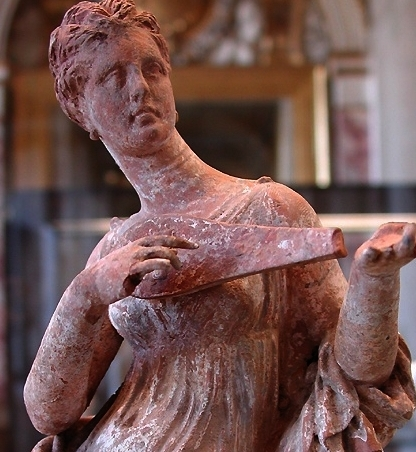
Pandura at Tanagra, Greece, c. 3rd century BC

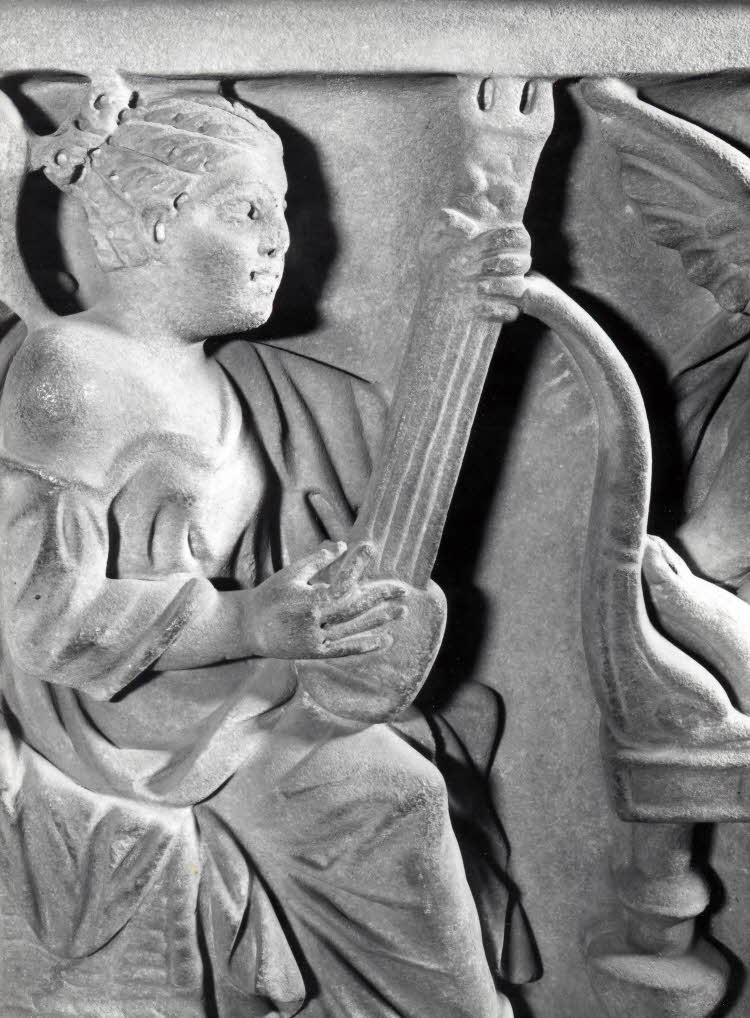
Roman guitar-type instrument depicted on a Roman sarcophagus dated to the 3rd century AD.

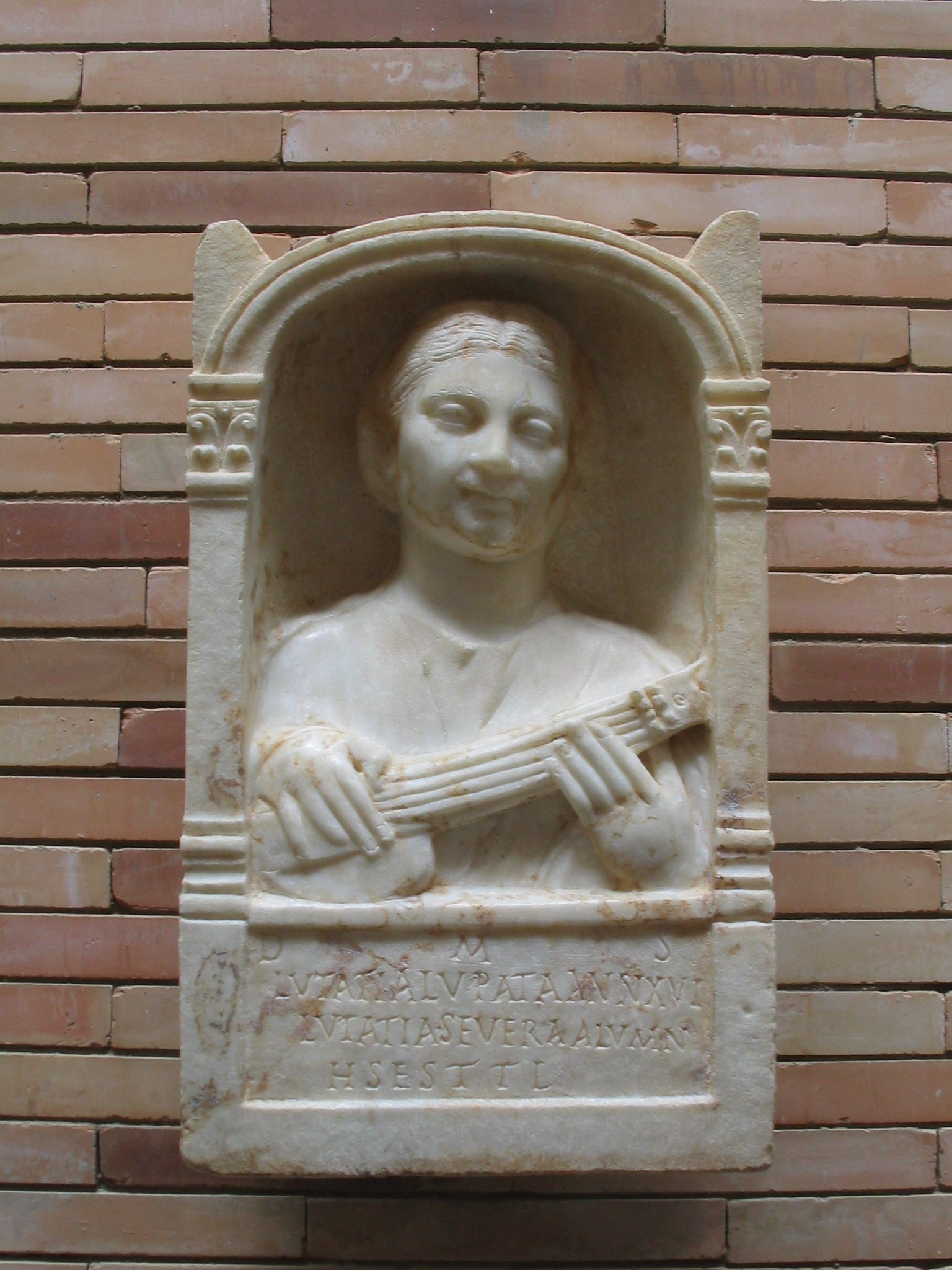
Roman pandura, 2nd century AD, found at Mérida, Spain

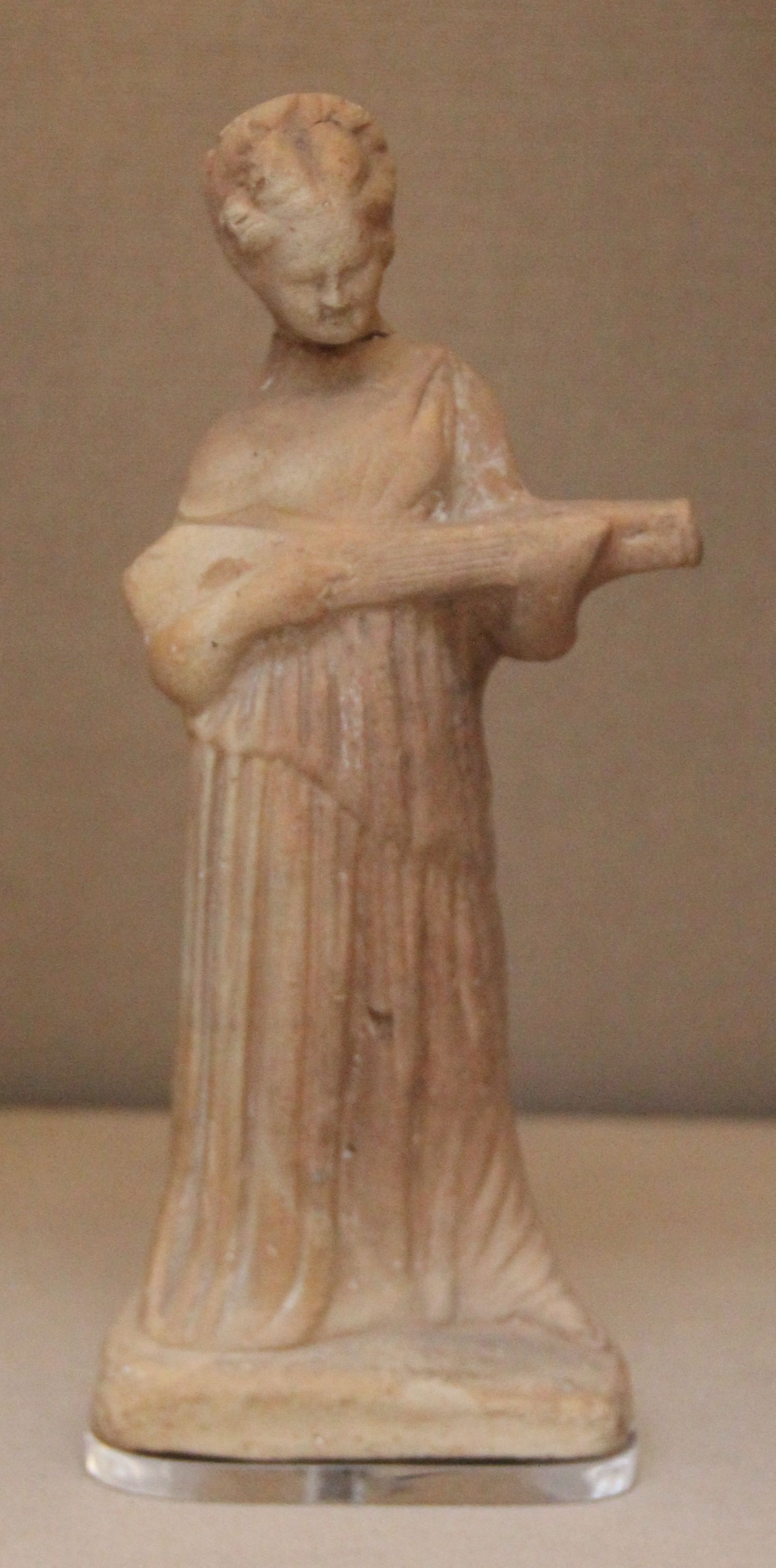
Woman Playing a Pandoura, Cyprus, circa 300 BC

The long-necked lute made the journey to Greece as well; in the 5th century BC the Egyptian lute made it into Greek sculpture, recognizable as a pierced lute, stick running into an oval body, with triangular bridge at base of instrument and two lines of soundholes parallel to the stick, on either side of it. A century later at Mantineia, the pierced lute would be changed, with a broader neck, somewhat shorter than the earlier Egyptian style lute, but still a long-necked instrument, with the neck longer than the soundbox. A second version at Tanagra in 200 BC was carved from a single piece of wood, neck and soundbox, pear-shaped much as the short-lutes that later arrived from Central Asia. Still another form of the pandura would have a one-piece carved triangular body with skin stretched across it.

Sachs describes the pandura as having three strings, tied still to the neck as there were no pegs, and a small body. The Greeks called the lute by multiple names, including trichordon (3-stringed) and pandura. He looks as the latter name as evidence that the instrument was foreign to Greece, introduced from the East; the name was derived from pan-tur, a Sumerian name meaning small bow. Sachs said that the instrument could be called "alternatively an Assyrian, a Cappadocian and an Egyptian instrument".

While examples exist across 1100 years, the pandura was rarely covered in Greek and Roman art, compared to the cithara, harp and lyre. One possible reason had to do with cultural values. In the Mesopotamia and in Egypt, the lute had been associated with dancing girls and with entertainment. Sumerian pottery and clay statues show that the lute players were often naked performers, with sexuality a part of the performance. The Egyptian girls are similarly scantily clad, dancing for their lords and ladies.

A millennium later at Rome in the 5th century AD, the pandura was a low-class instrument with a "disreputable association with frivolity and low merry-making". A story about St Theodoulos the Stylite says that he was tested by God, forced to associate with Cornelius the pandouros (pandura player). According to the story, "Theodoulos is horrified at being associated with a man from the theatre" and more horrified to find "Cornelius at the Hippodrome, holding his instrument with one hand, and with the other, a bareheaded prostitute".

Lack of artwork does not necessarily mean absence of the lute in Roman and Greek society. What images have survived of Greek and Roman pandura players are from high-class art. In the statuary, plaques and a mosaic in the Byzantine emperor's palace, players are dignified and clothed. The art, made for the wealthy upper classes doesn't show the lower-class places where Theodoulos was shocked.

==== Gallery: Egyptian, Coptic or Byzantine lutes ====
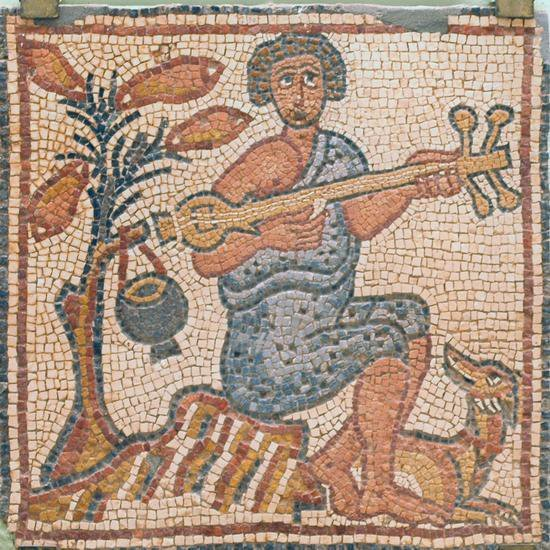
Coptic, Byzantine or Egyptian long-necked lute, 4th century AD, Qasr Libya (the Byzantine city of Theodoureas)

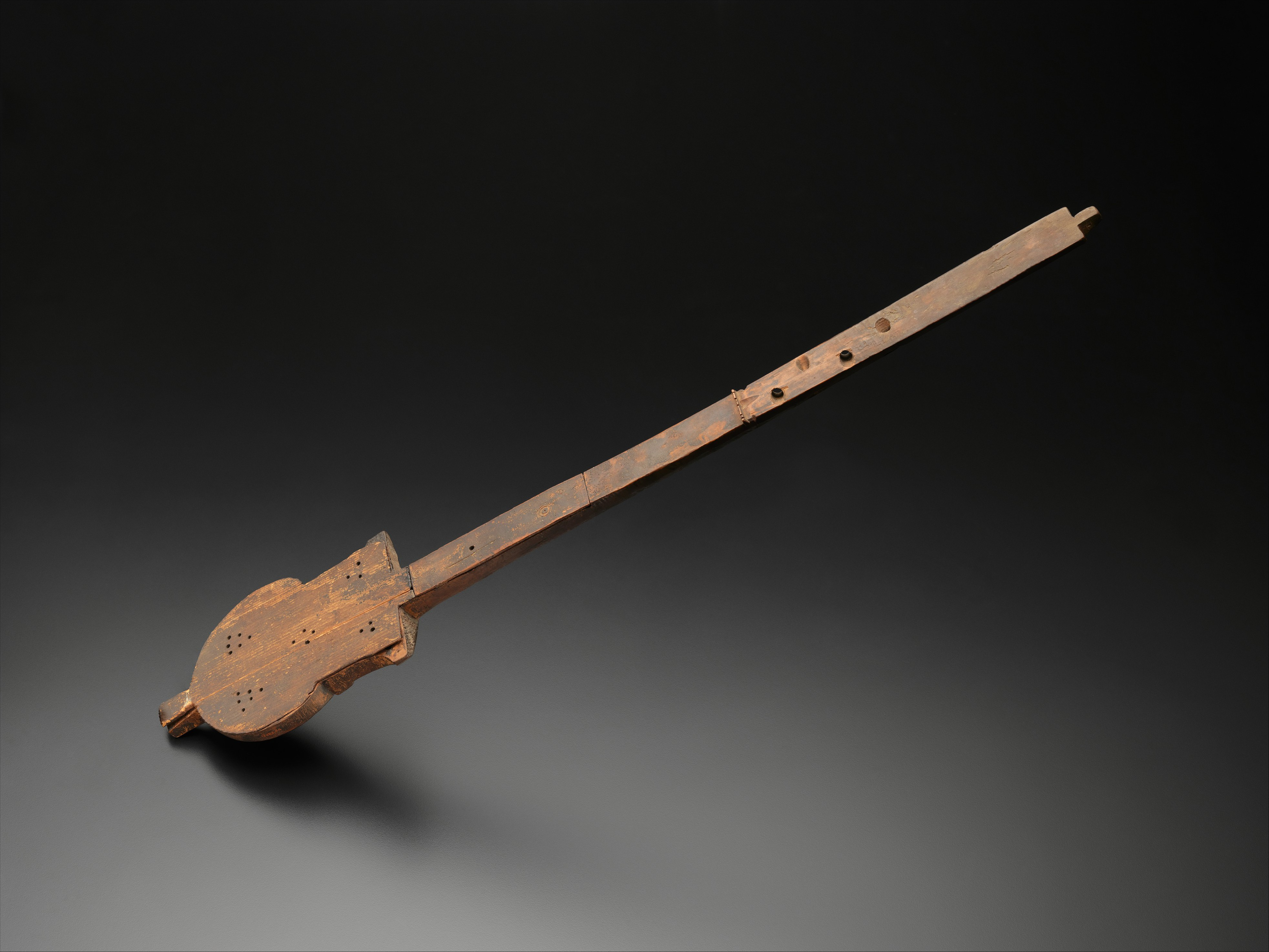
Coptic, Byzantine or Egyptian lute, c. 1–500 AD

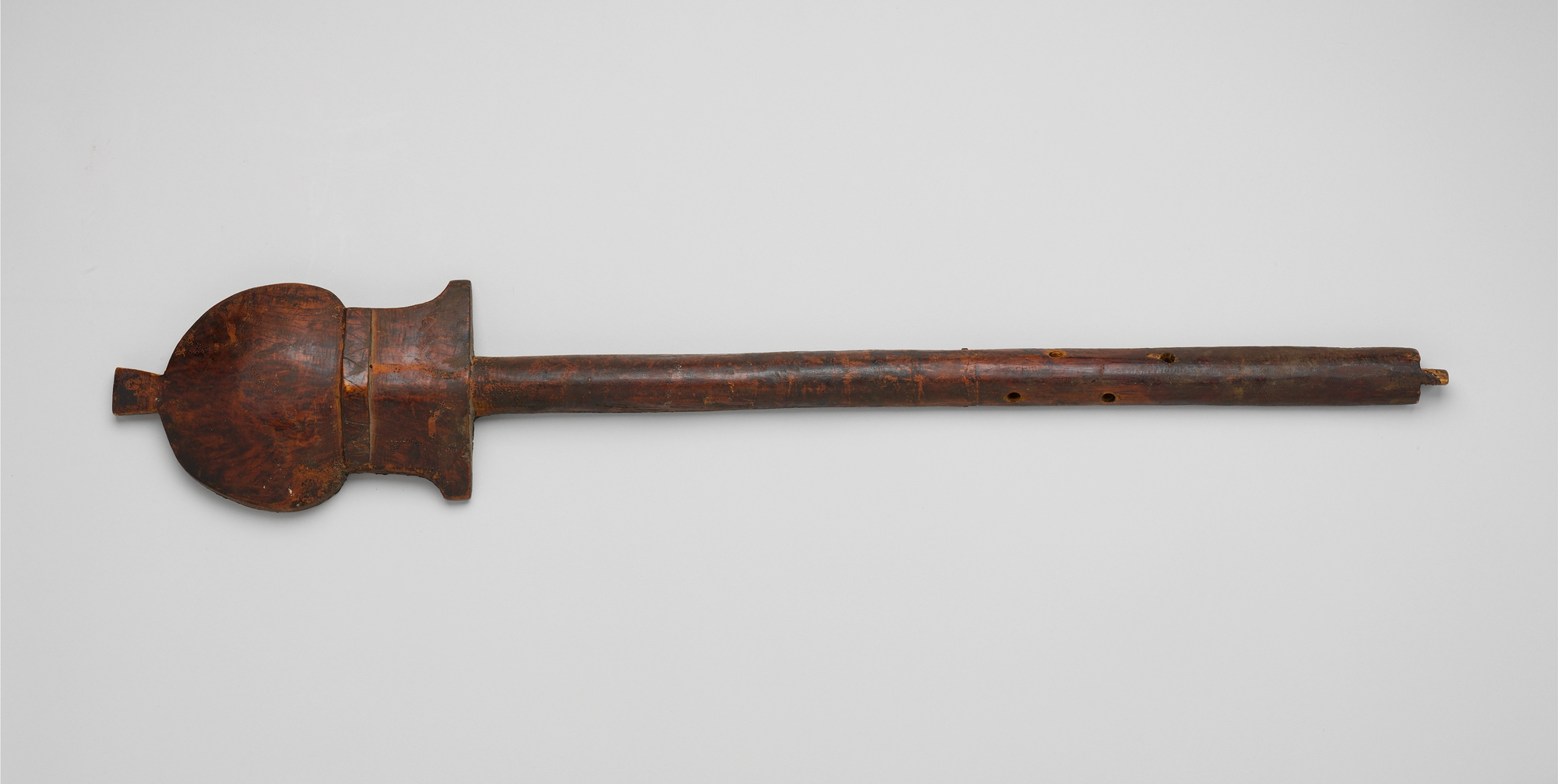
Coptic, Byzantine or Egyptian lute, c. 1–500 AD

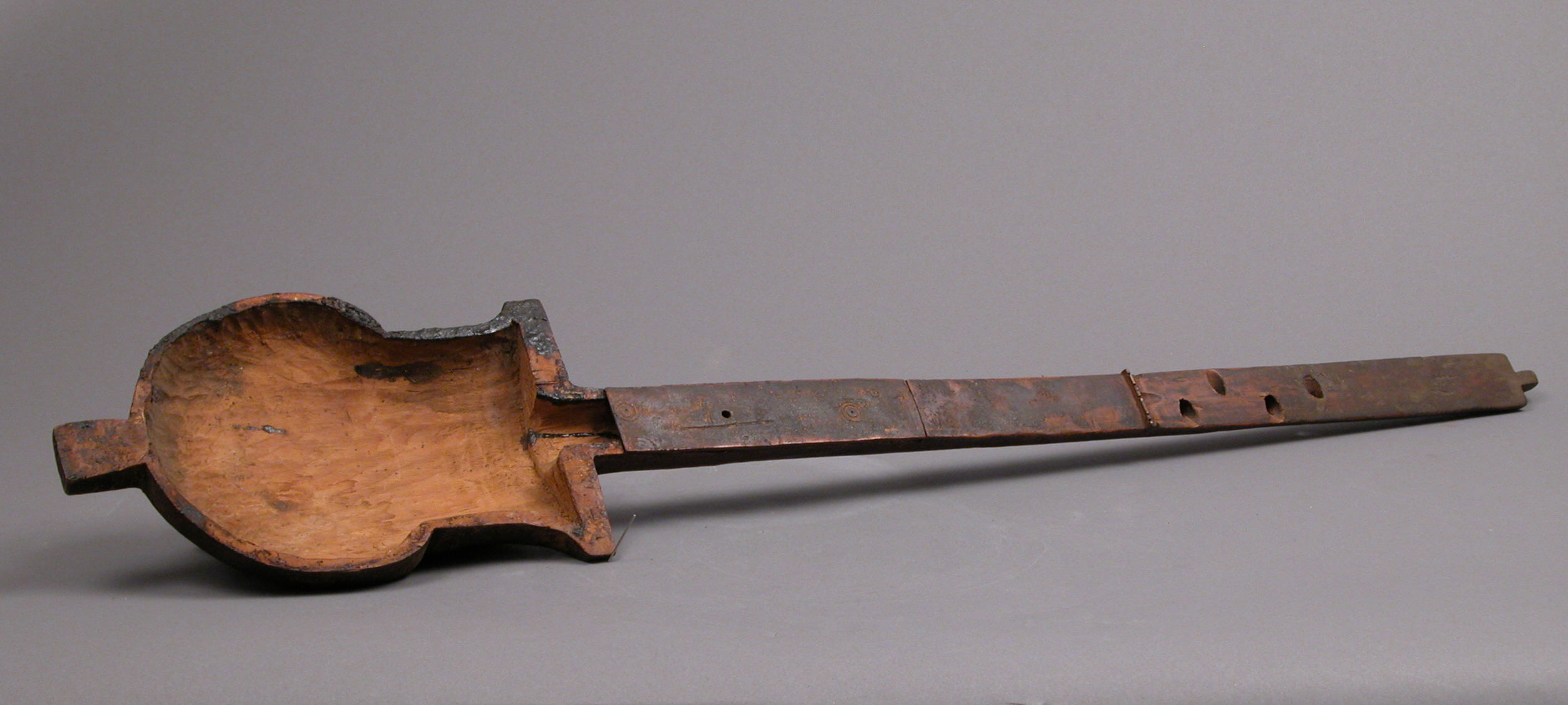
Coptic, Byzantine or Egyptian lute, c. 1–500 AD, neck is hollow like rubab neck

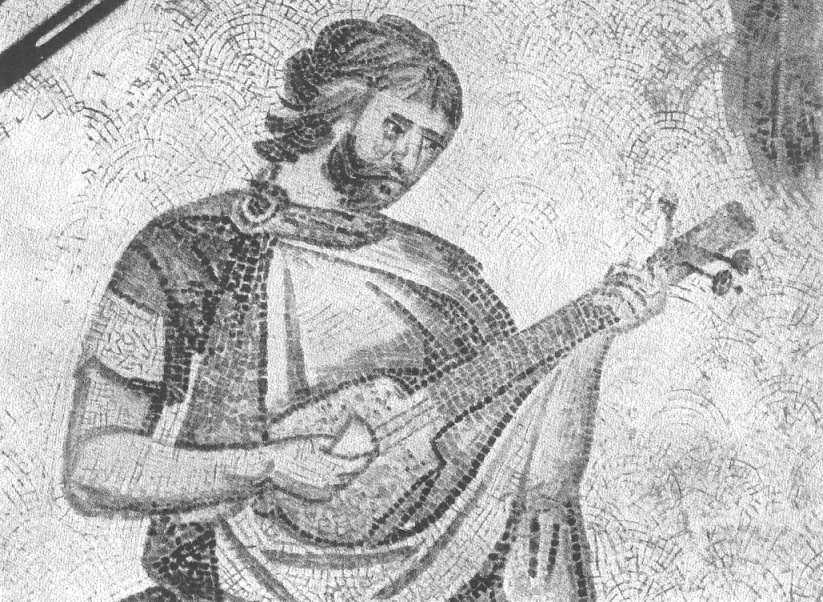
Byzantine pandura, 6th-century AD depiction on mosaic in the Great Palace in Constantinople. The instrument has three strings and is being played with a plectrum.

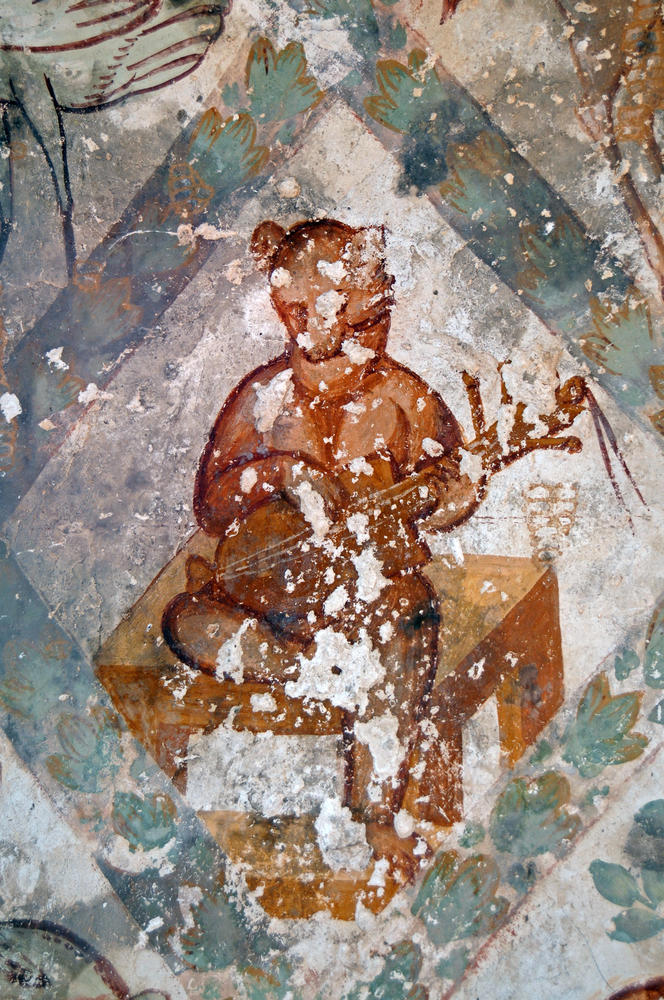
Unknown lute-family instrument, 723-743 AD Qusayr 'Amra. Byzantine/Islamic culture was mixing at time of painting.

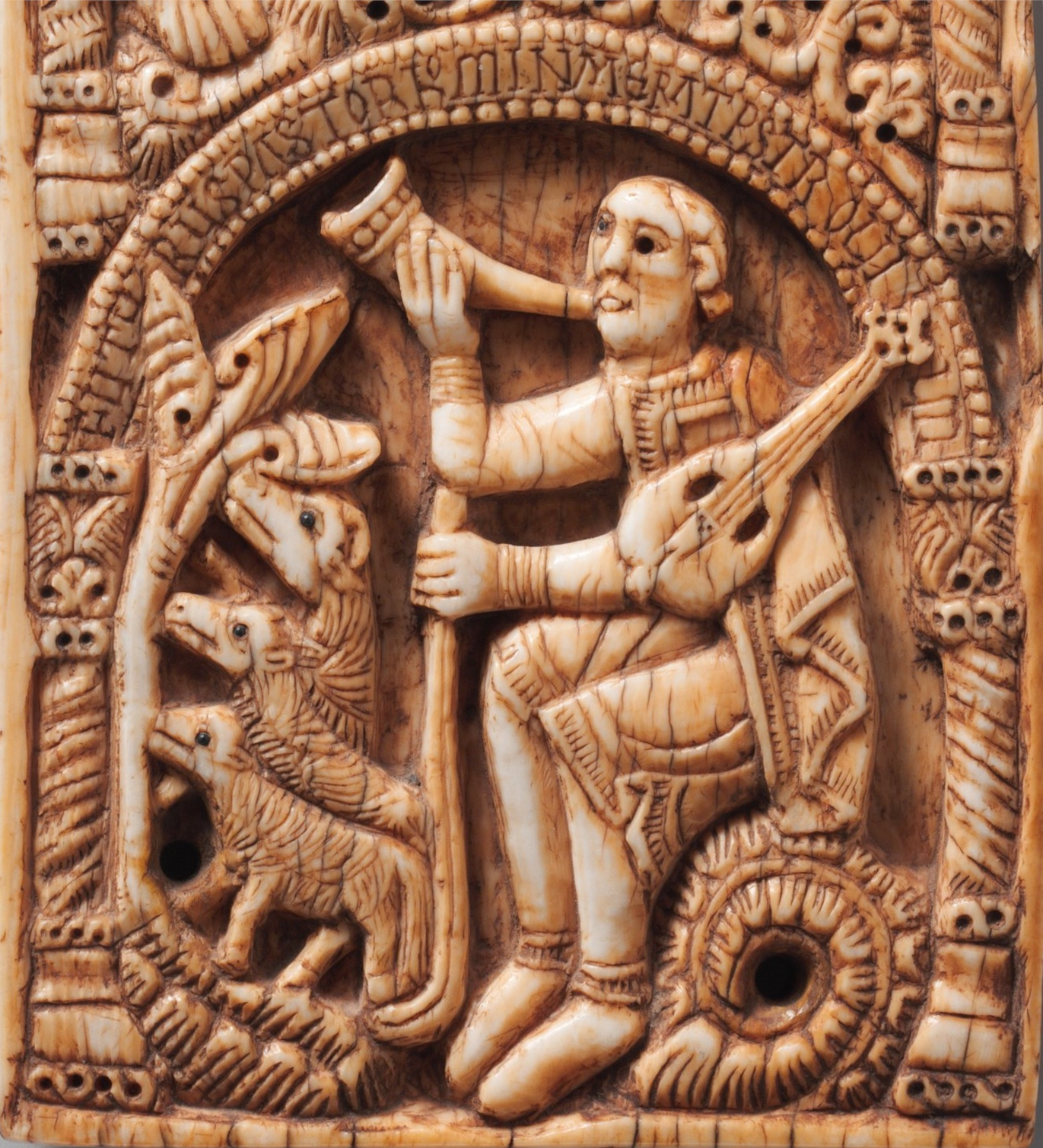
1060-1080 A.D., Spain. Saint Aemilian of Cogolla herding sheep with cowhown and 3-stringed lute. Lute has similar shape to pandura. Peghead resembles pegheads on cythara in Utrecht Psalter.

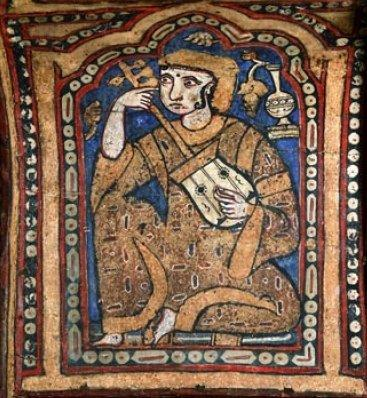
Unknown lute-family instrument, possible rubab or Coptic lute. C. 1140 AD, Capella Palatina, Sicily.

=== Tanbur family ===
Tanburs have been present in Mesopotamia since the Akkadian era, or the 3rd millennium BC.

Three figurines have been found in Susa that belong to 1500 BC, and in hands of one of them is a tanbur-like instrument. Also an image on the rocks near Mosul that belong to about 1000 BC shows tanbur players.

Playing the tanbur was common at least by the late Parthian era and Sassanid period, and the word 'tanbur' is found in middle Persian and Parthian language texts, for instance in Drakht-i Asurig, Bundahishn, Kar-Namag i Ardashir i Pabagan, and Khosrow and Ridag. (Note: fa:خسرو و ریدگ)

In the 10th century AD Al-Farabi described two types of tanburs found in Persia, a Baghdad tunbūr, distributed south and west of Baghdad, and a Khorasan tunbūr. This distinction may be the source of modern differentiation between Arabic instruments, derived from the Baghdad tunbūr, and those found in northern Iraq, Syria, Iran, Sindh and Turkey, from the Khorasan tunbūr.

The Persian name spread widely, eventually taking in long-necked string instruments used in Central Asian music such as the Dombura and the classical Turkish tambur as well as the Kurdish tembûr. Until the early 20th century, the names chambar and jumbush were applied to instruments in northern Iraq. In India the name was applied to the tanpura (tambura), a fretless drone lute. Tanbur traveled through Al-Hirah to the Arabian Peninsula and in the early Islam period went to the European countries. Tanbur was called 'tunbur' or 'tunbureh/tunbura' in Al-Hirah, and in Greek it was named tambouras, then went to albania as tampura, in Russia it was named domra, in Siberia and Mongolia as dombra, and in Byzantine Empire was named pandura/bandura. It travelled through Byzantine Empire to other European countries and was called pandura, mandura, bandura, etc.

Later the Iranian (Kurdish) tanbur became associated with the music of the Ahl-e Haqq, a primarily Kurdish ghulat religious movement similar to a Sufi order, in Kurdish areas and in the Lorestān and Sistan va Baluchestan provinces of Iran, where it is called the 'tembûr'.

Persians have another naming system for differentiating different styles of the instrument, using the word tar with a number for the number of strings or courses of strings. Instruments named this way include the dutar (2 strings/courses), setar (three strings/courses), cartar (4 strings/courses) and panctar (five strings/courses). A course is multiple strings played together, so that a setar can have 6 strings altogether, but the strings are divided in three rows or courses.

The pegs on the long-lutes are different than on short lutes (such as the oud) where a pegbox has pegs accessed from the sides. On long lutes, some are inserted from the front, some from the side. Sachs felt that the pegs were an indication of mixed origins for tanbur. Front and side elements came from Arabo/Persian instruments, rear pegs from Turkish.

The tanbur family includes

- bağlama (Saz)
- bouzouki related to tanburs but also of European lute tradition
- çifteli
- cura
- dombra Dombura shares some of its characteristics with the Central Asian komuz and dutar.
  - Dombura in Turkish,
  - Dombıra, in Uzbekistan and Tajikistan,
  - Dambura or Danbura in northern Afghanistan, Tajikistan, and Uzbekistan,[1]
  - Hazara Dambura or Hazaragi Dambura The Dambura which is played by Hazara people mostly in Afghanistan.[2]
  - Dumbura in Bashkir and Tatar,
  - Dombor in Mongolia,
  - Dombyra in Kazakhstan,
  - Dombira or 冬不拉 (Dongbula) in Xinjiang, China
  - domra Russian instrument, recreated in the 1800s, modern version is shorter necked like mandolin
  - balalaika Russian instrument. Related to domra.
- dutar
- komuz (not same as kobyz), Kyrgyz instrument. Placement of this instrument in tanbur family not certain. A skin-topped version has existed.
- pandura
- sato (bowed)
- setar looks very similar to tanbur. Has three courses of strings (normally four strings total, but as many as six)
  - Chitrali sitar
- Sataer bowed instrument
- setor
- sitar
- tambura, played in Balkan peninsula, possibly identical to tamburica
- tamboori an Indian melodic instrument similar to a Tanpura
- tambouras played in Greece
- tamburica any member of a family of long-necked lutes popular in Eastern and Central Europe
- tanbur, tanbur, tanbūr, Tambur a long-necked, string instrument originating in the Southern or Central Asia (Mesopotamia and Persia/Iran). Three strings total (not courses).
- Iranian tanbur (Kurdish tanbur), used in Yarsan rituals
- Turkish tambur, instrument played in Turkey
- Yaylı tambur, also played in Turkey
- tanpura, a drone instrument played in India
- tar
- tembor longer than most
- tzouras

Instruments not included on this list provide a chance to think about the instruments' evolution. Early Mesopotamian long-necked lutes would have had skin tops and sound-bowls that were either carved from wood or made from a turtle shell. There was a divergence; modern tanburs have wood tops, while rubabs have skin tops. One instrument straddled the line, the Byzantine or Coptic lute. These appear to have been successors of the middle east long-lute tradition, in which Egypt participated. They have a wooden soundboard (a tanbur trait), however, the neck is hollow (a rubab trait). Also the Byzantine lute from Qasr Libya, in Libya, has barbs on its top, a rubab trait. The Coptic lute also overlaps with an instrument that Curt Sachs called a pandura, the instrument illustrated in the mosaic in the Byzantine emperor's palace in Constantinople.

The other long lutes not included here are because of their rubab orientation are the dotara, dramyin, rawap and pamiri rubab. They have soundboards of skin and may also have hollow necks.

==== Gallery: Tanbur family lutes ====
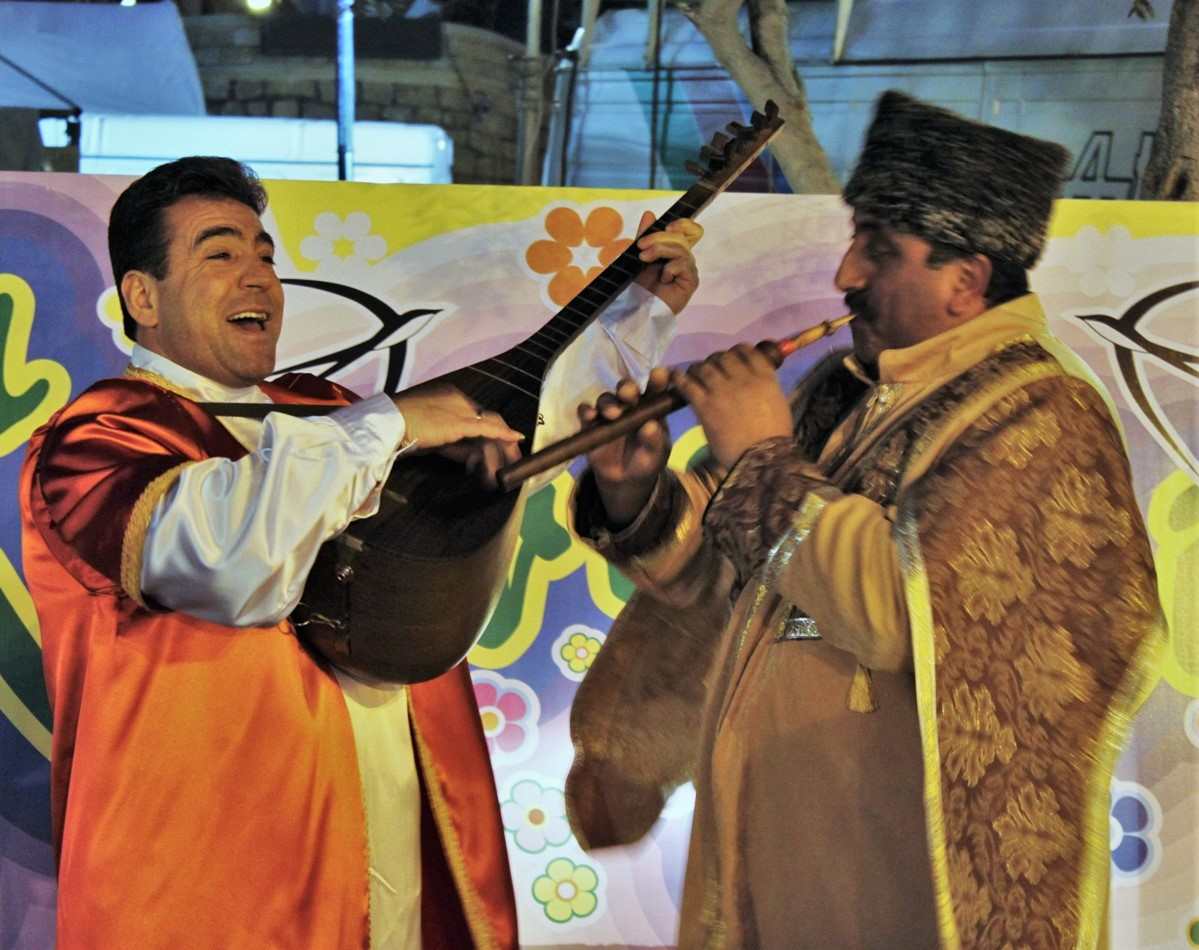
bağlama or Azerbaijani saz (left)

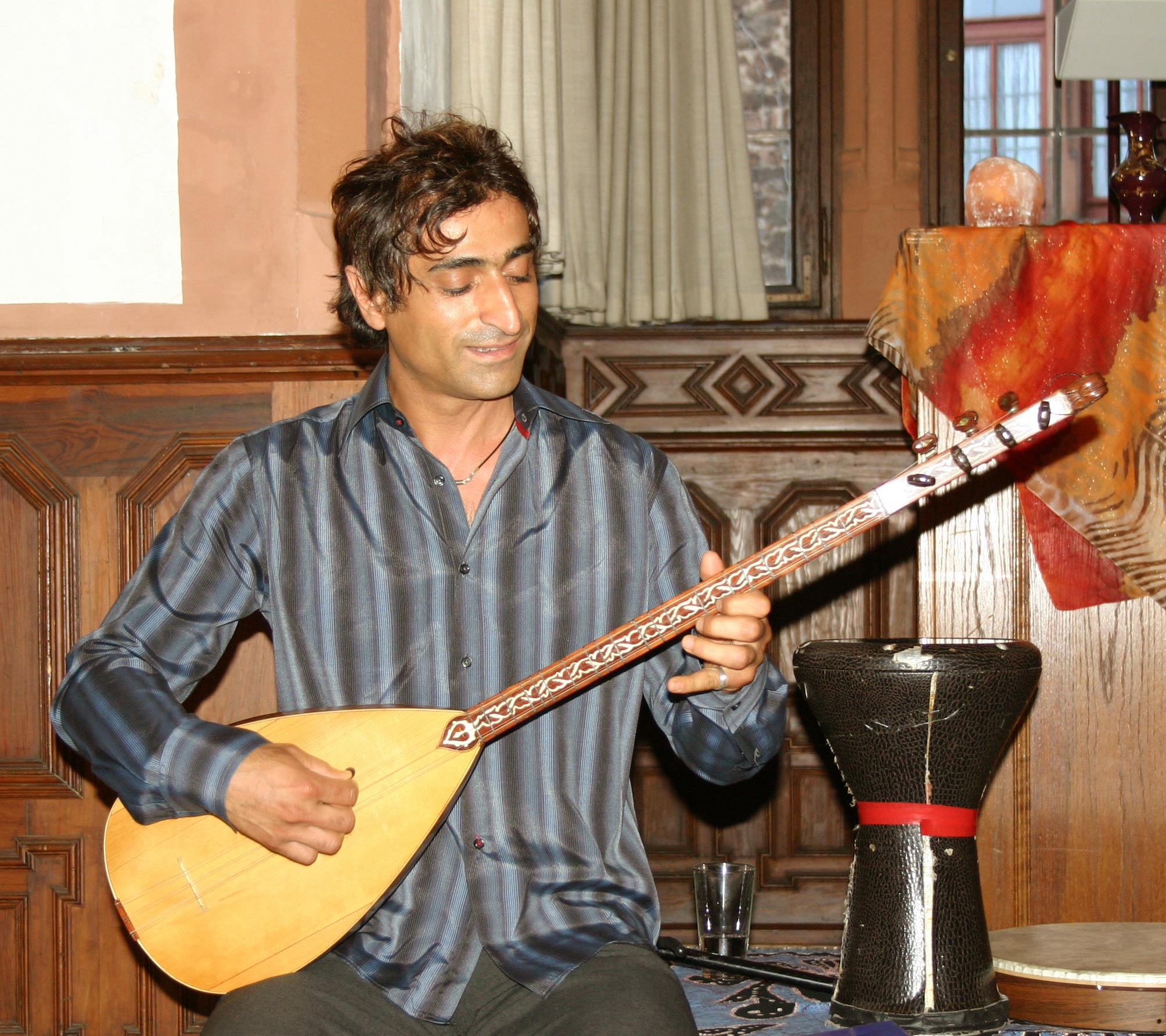
bağlama or saz

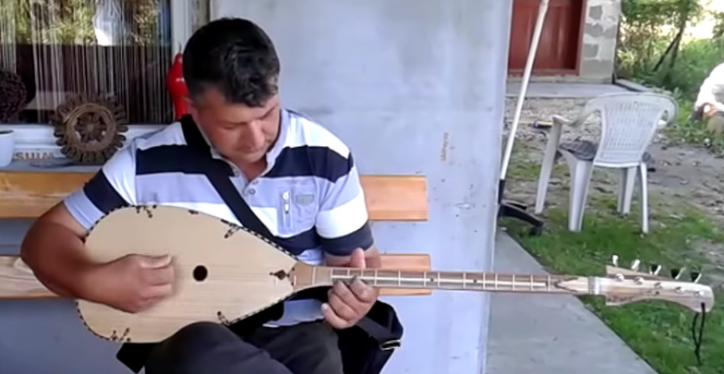
Balkans. Šargija, closely related to Balkan tambura

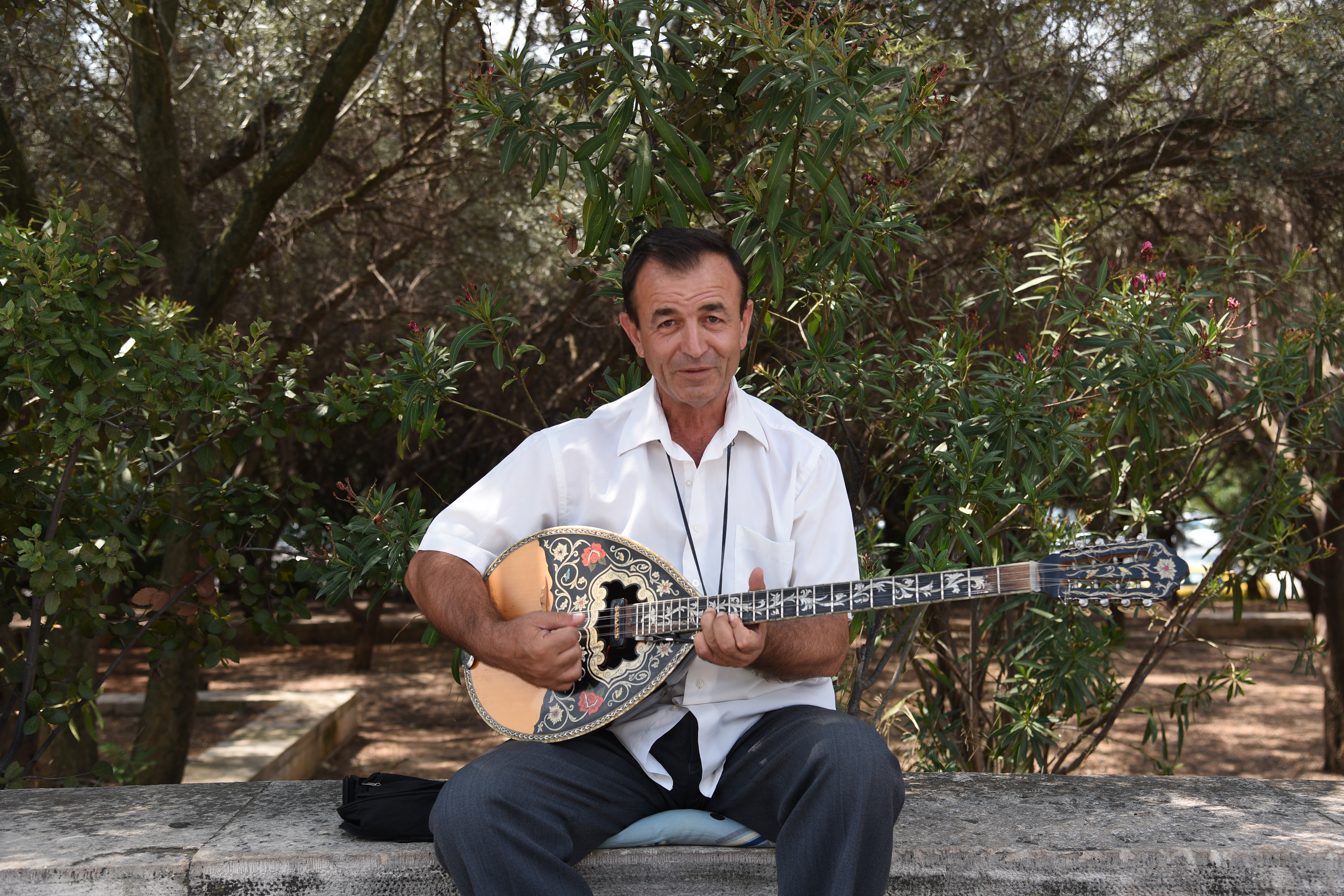
Greek bouzouki

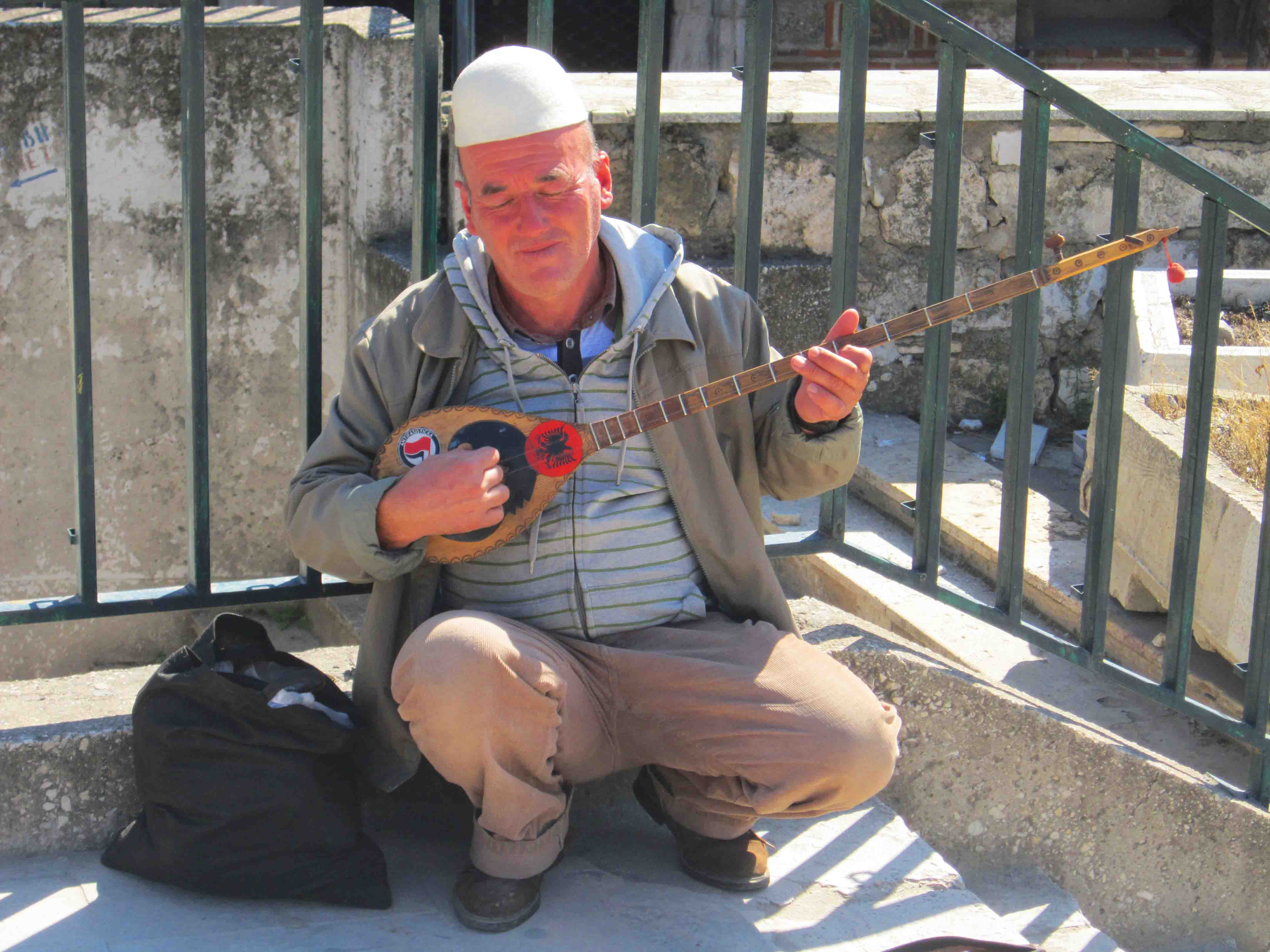
Gheg Albanian çifteli

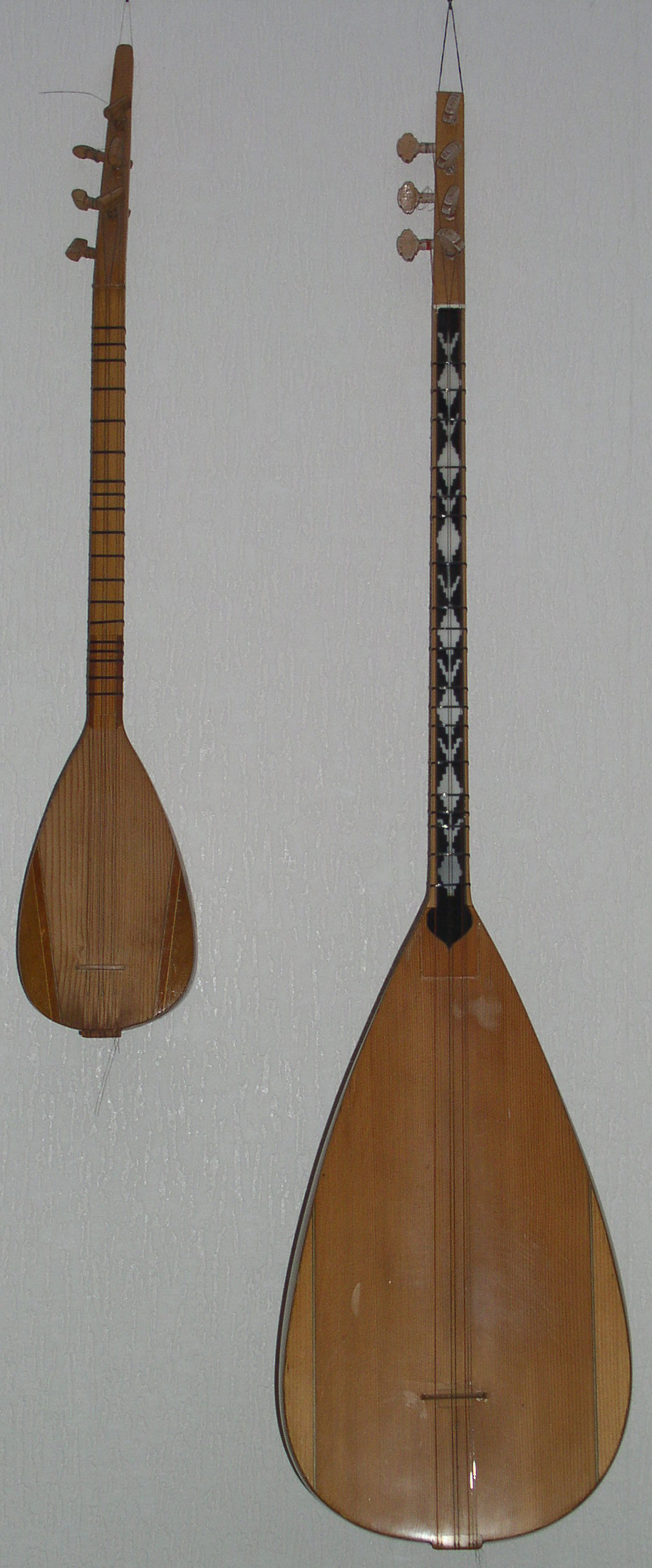
bağlama (right) and cura

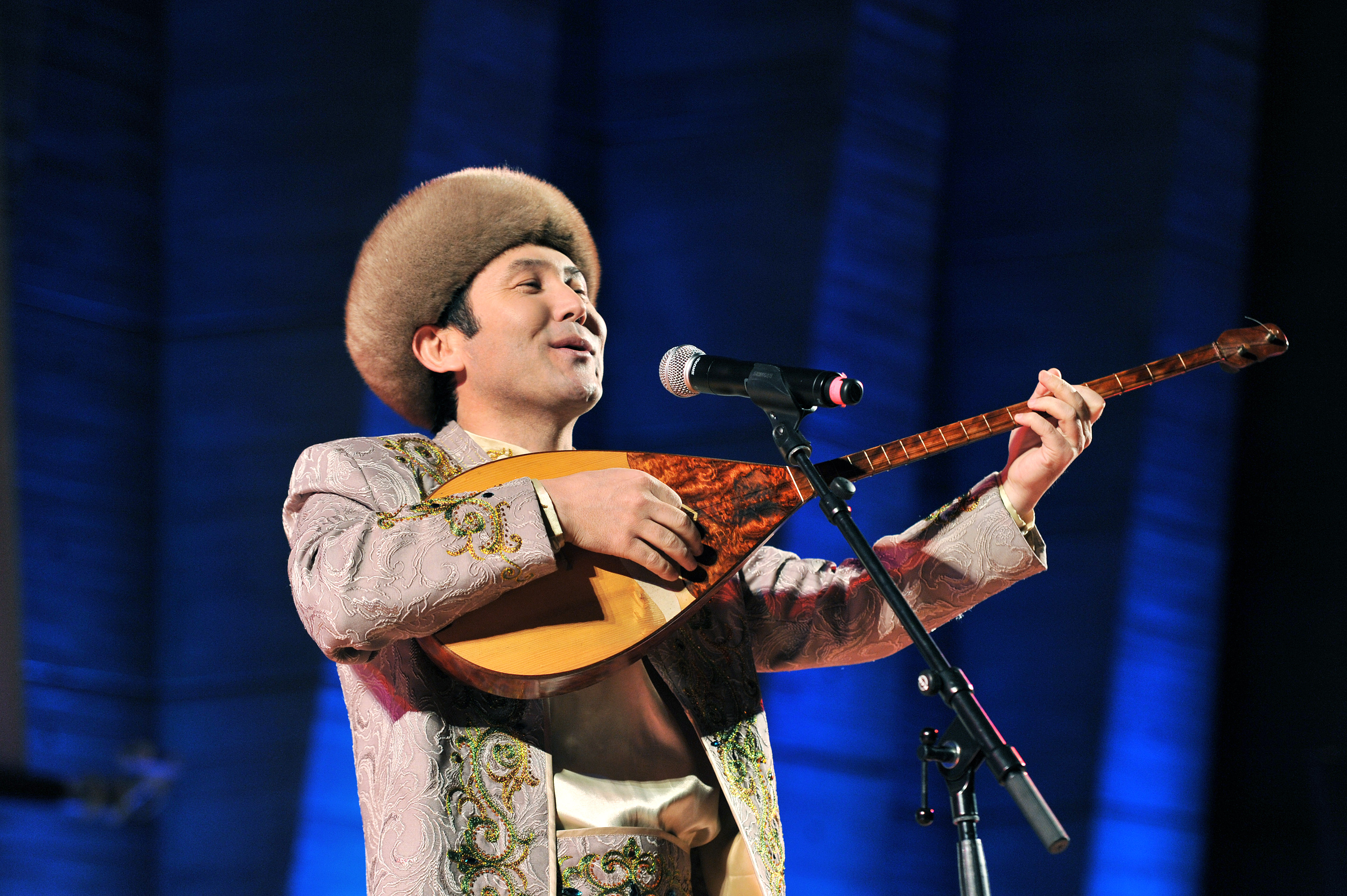
Dombra or dambura

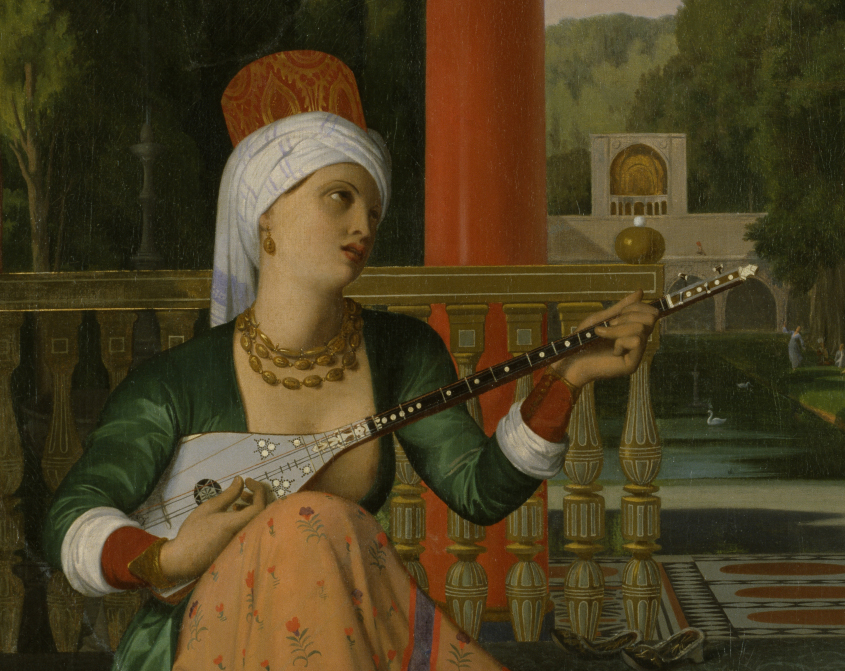
Dutar (four strings in two courses)

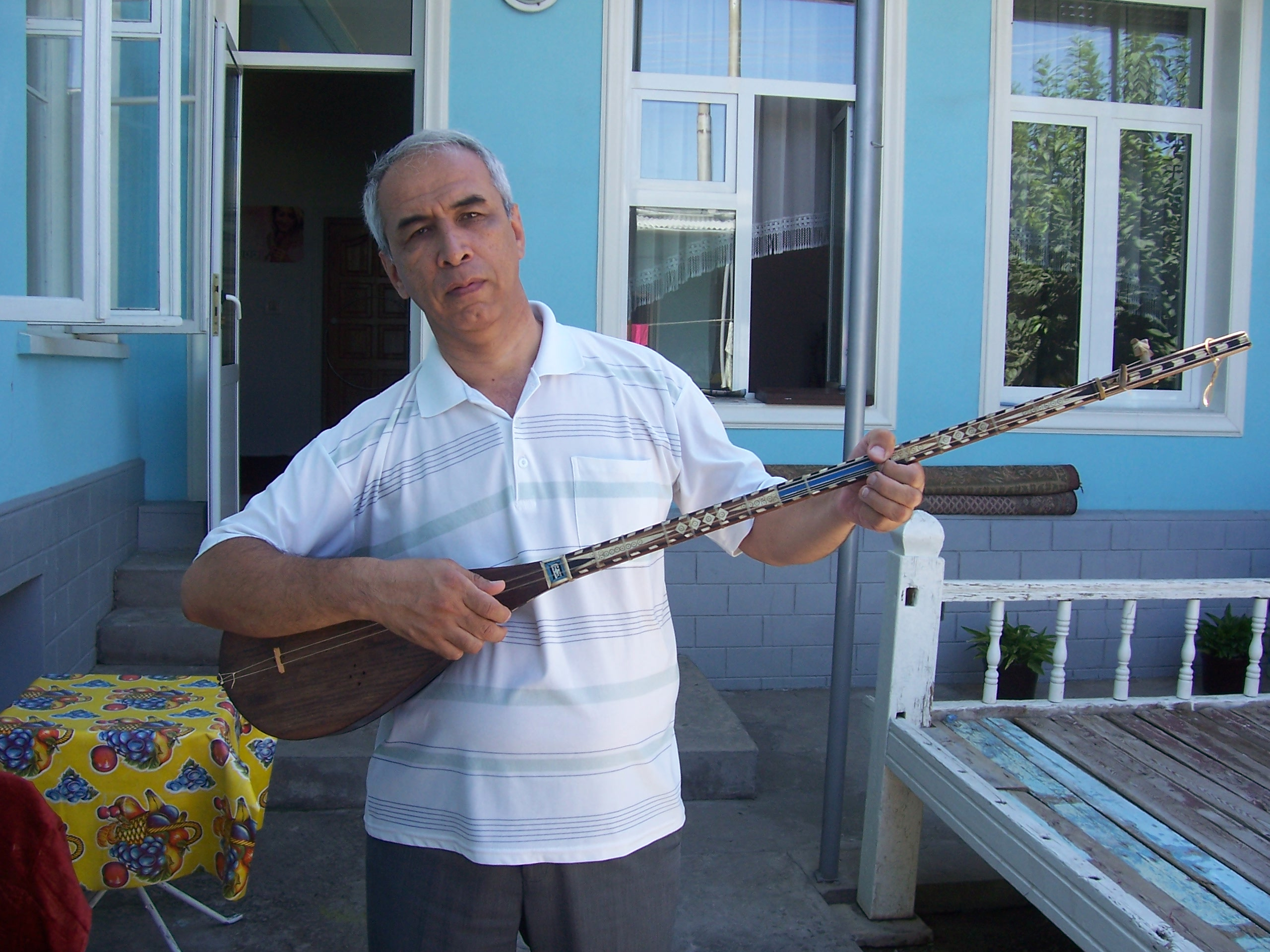
Uzbek dutar. Also Tajik

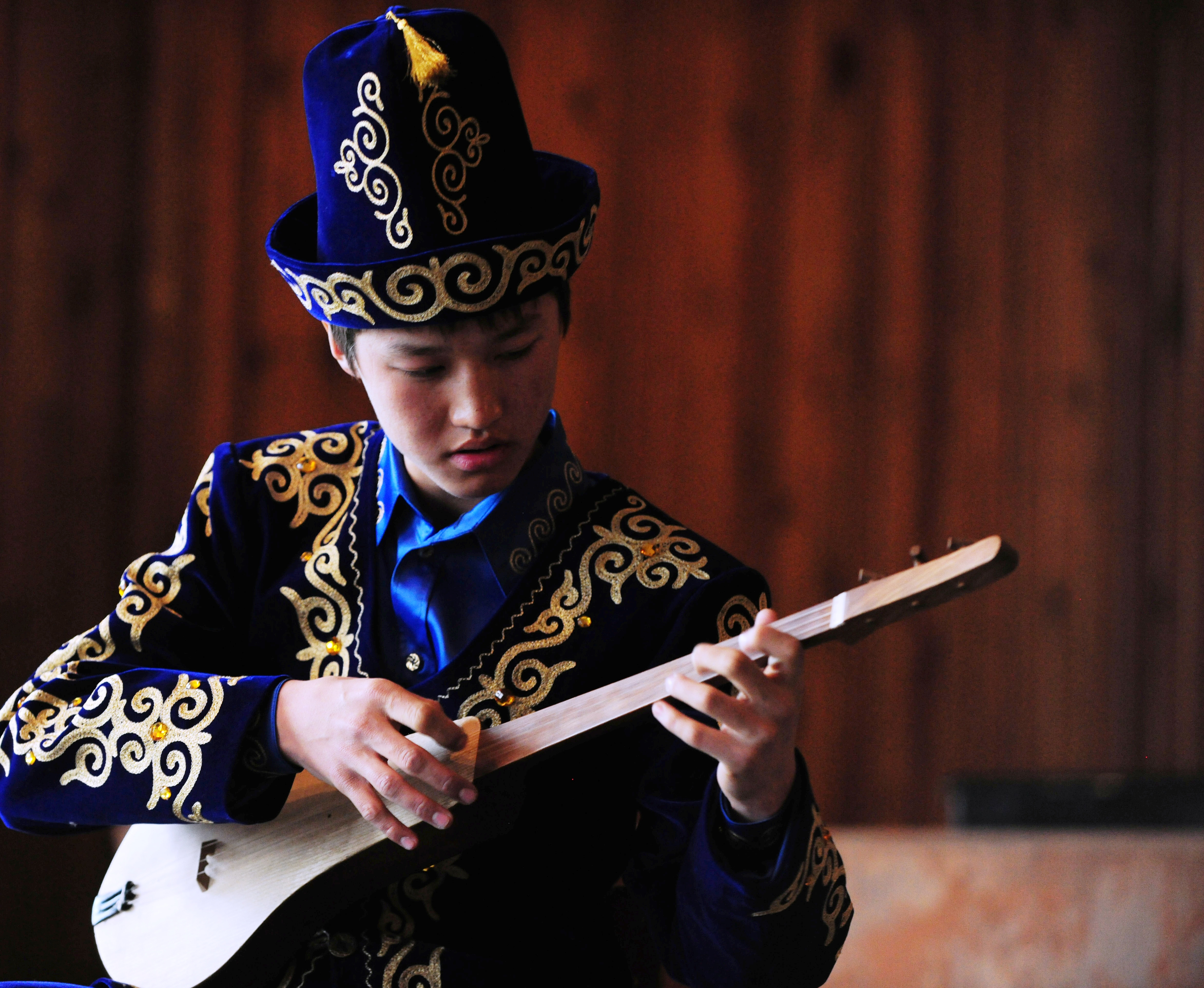
Kirgiz komuz

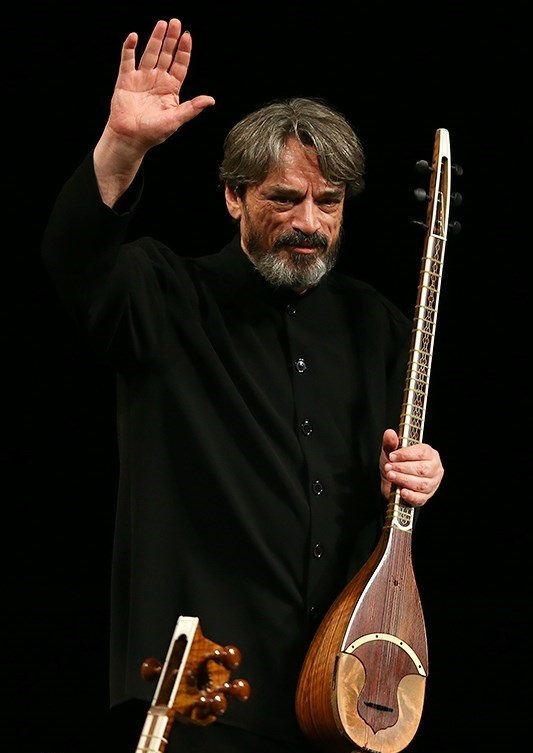
Iranian setar, musician Hossein Alizadeh

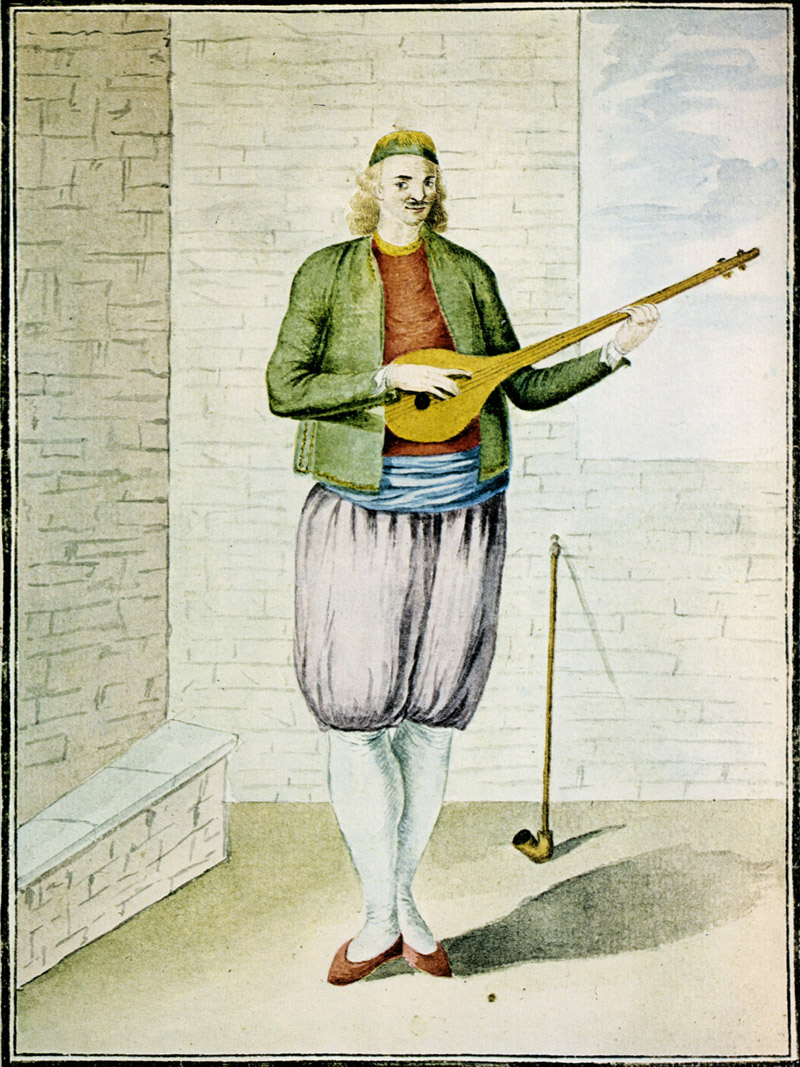
Greek tambouras

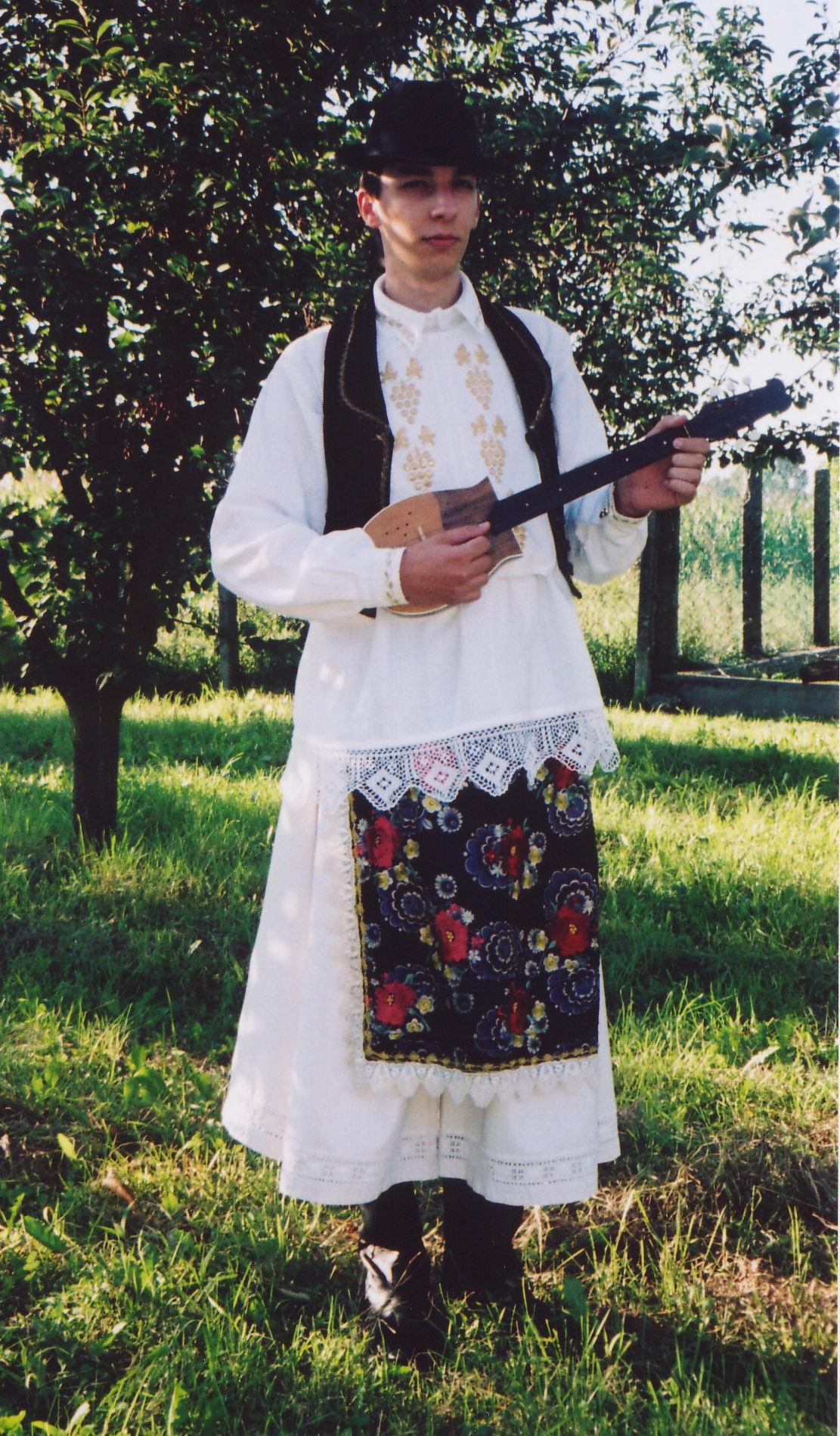
Southern/Central European tamburica

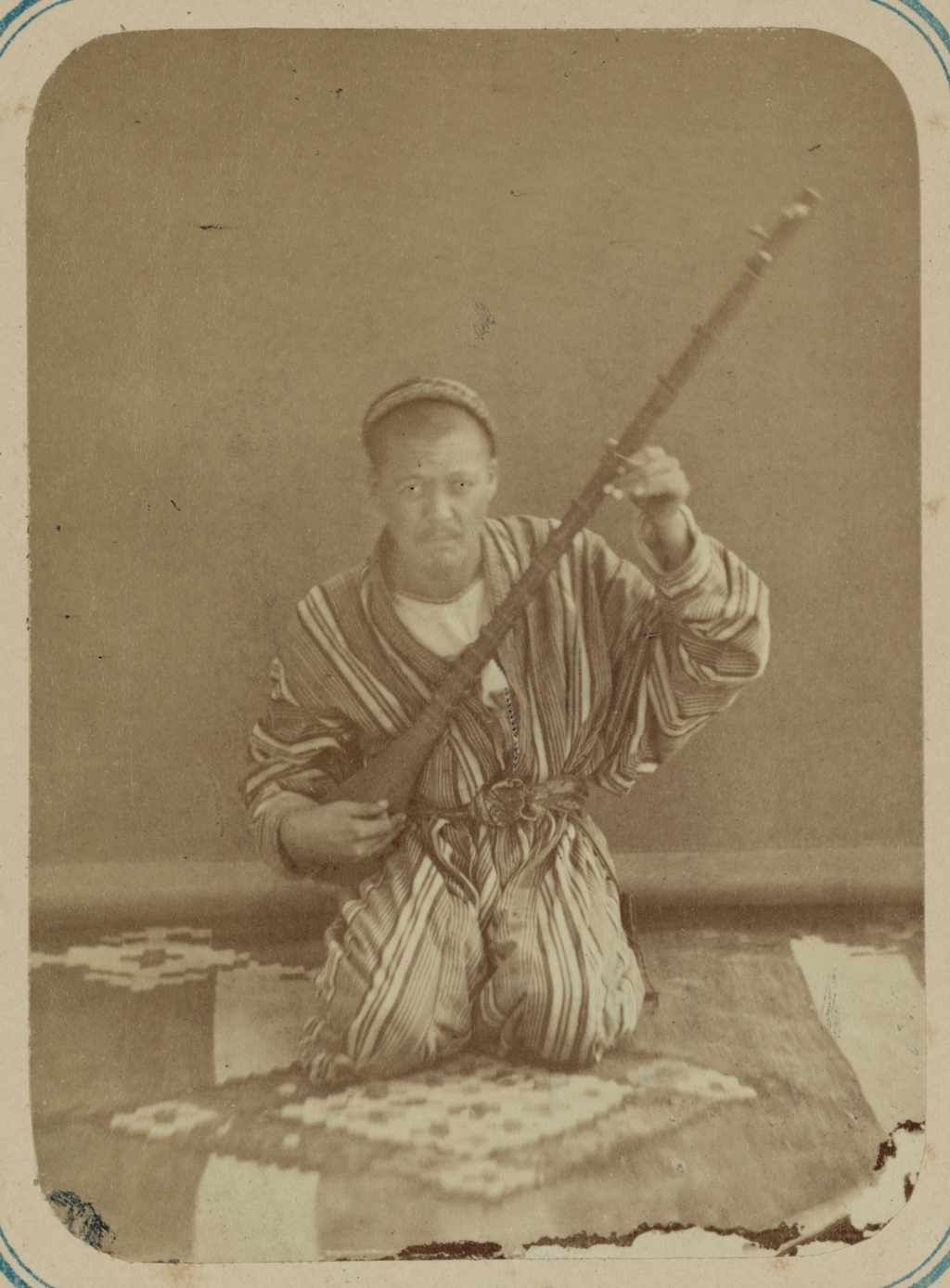
Central Asian tanbur/tambur, 1865–1872

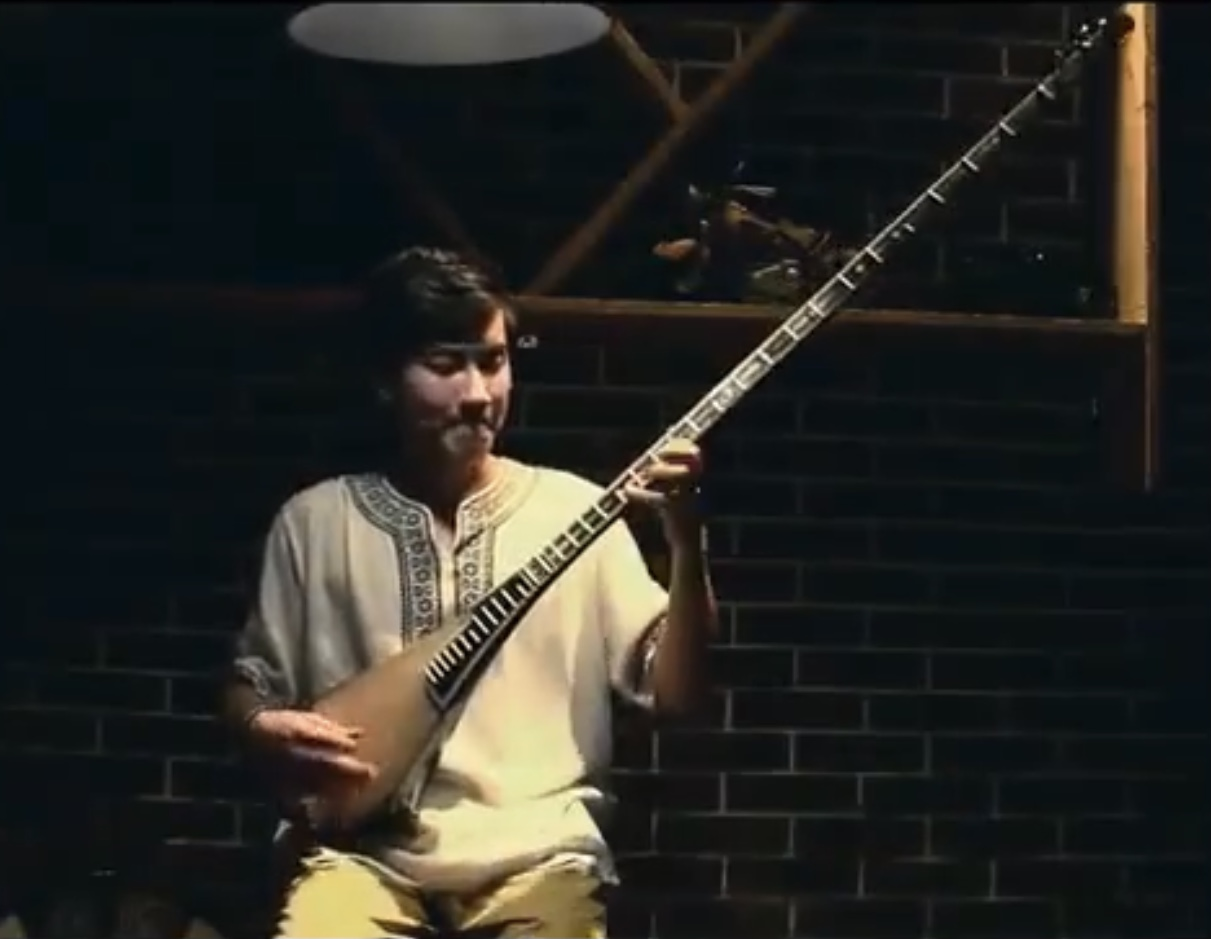
Uyghurs Tembor

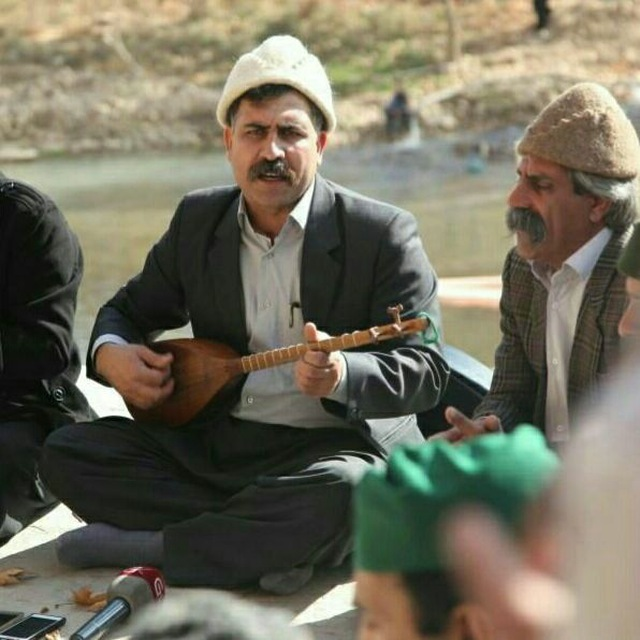
Iranian/Kurdish tanbur. Musician and luthier Ghobad Ghobadi (تنبورقبادی), a face of Yarsanism plays a Kurdish tanbur. Ghobadi makes tanburs in the Yarsan tradition.

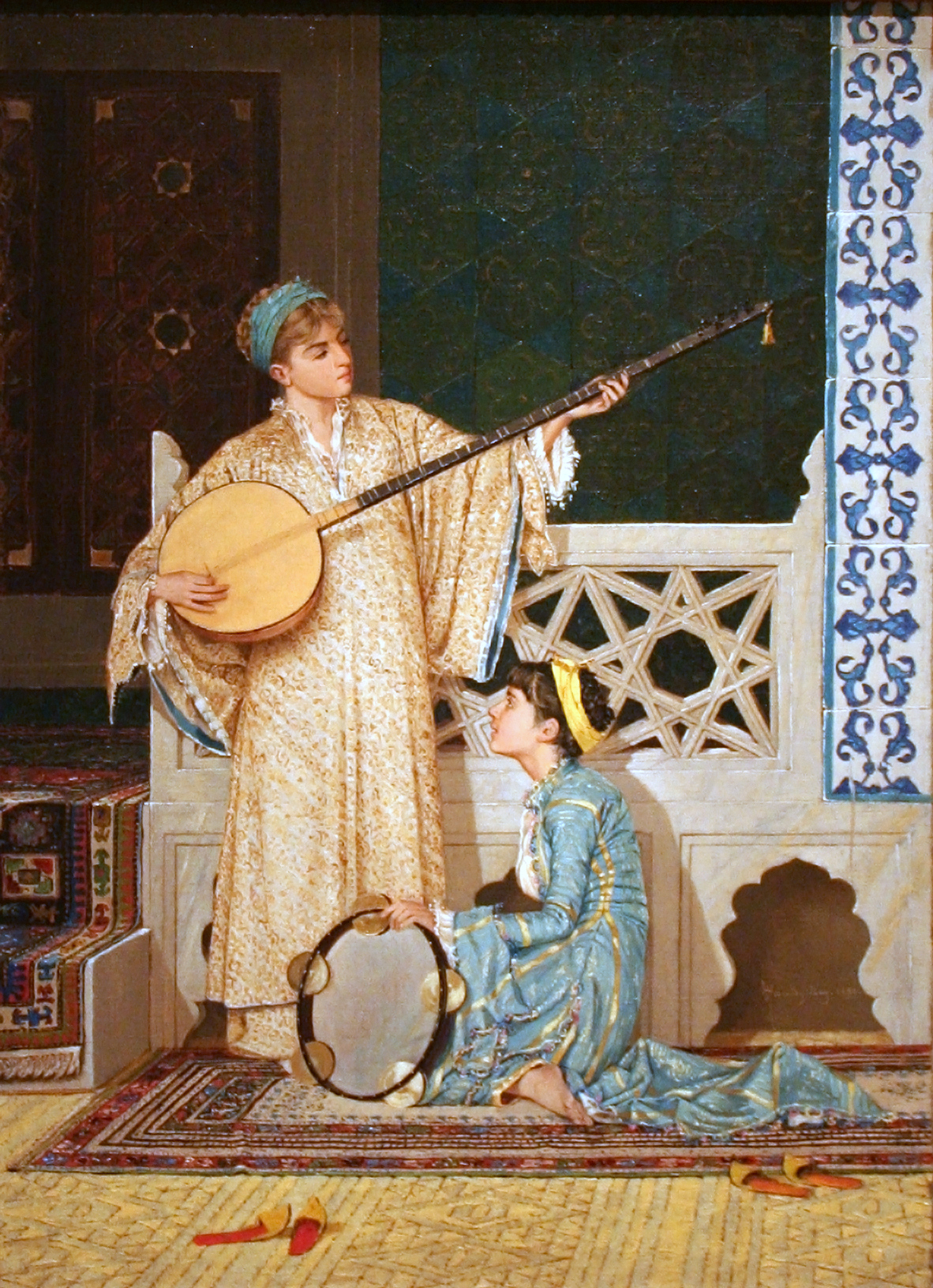
Ottoman tambur, also known as Turkish tambur, 1880

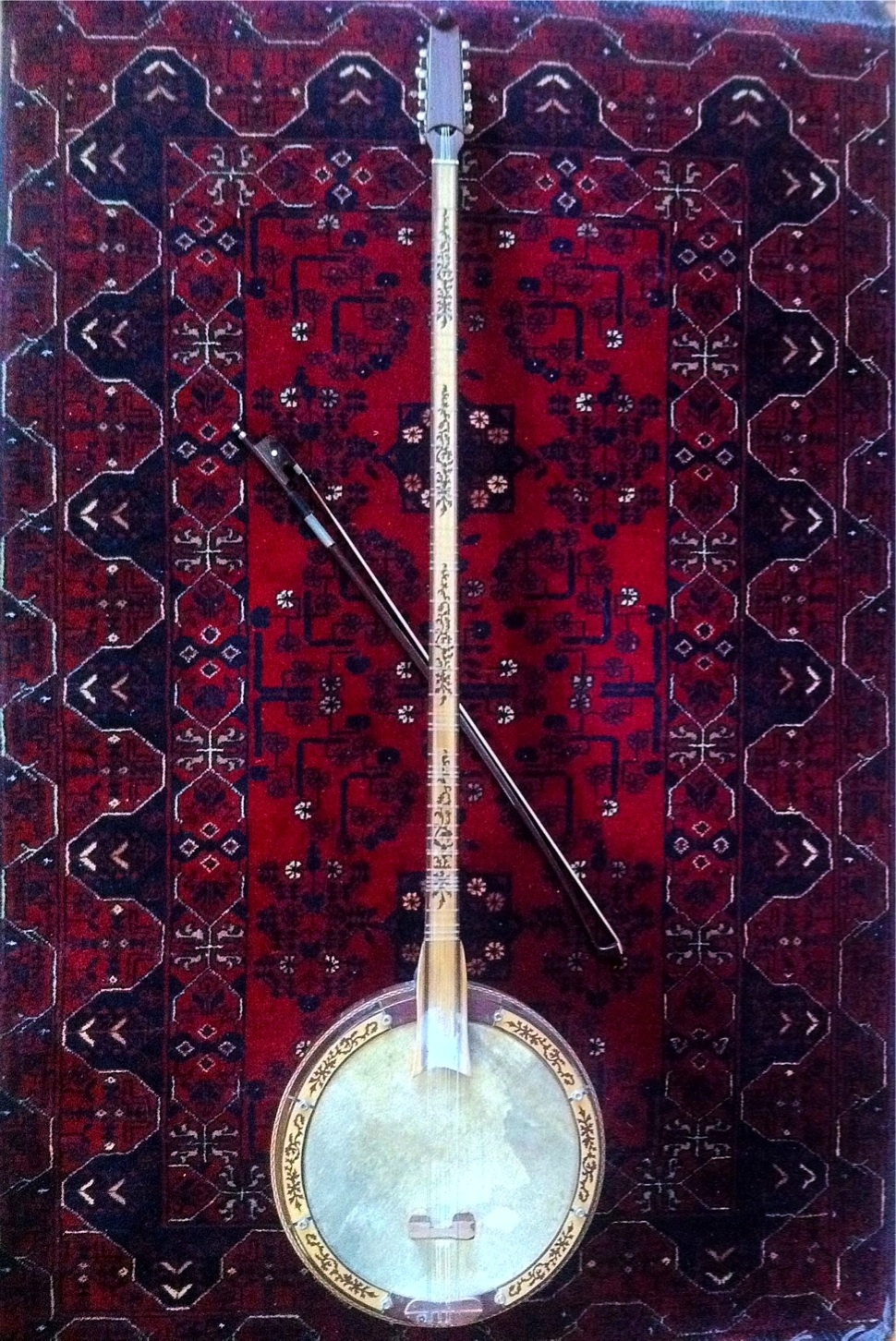
Yaylı tambur a variation of Turkish tambur, metal and uses a bow

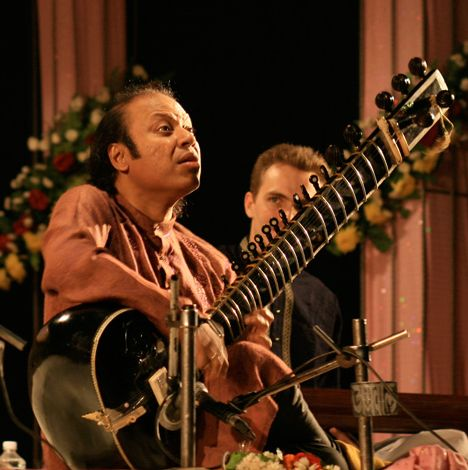
Indian sitar

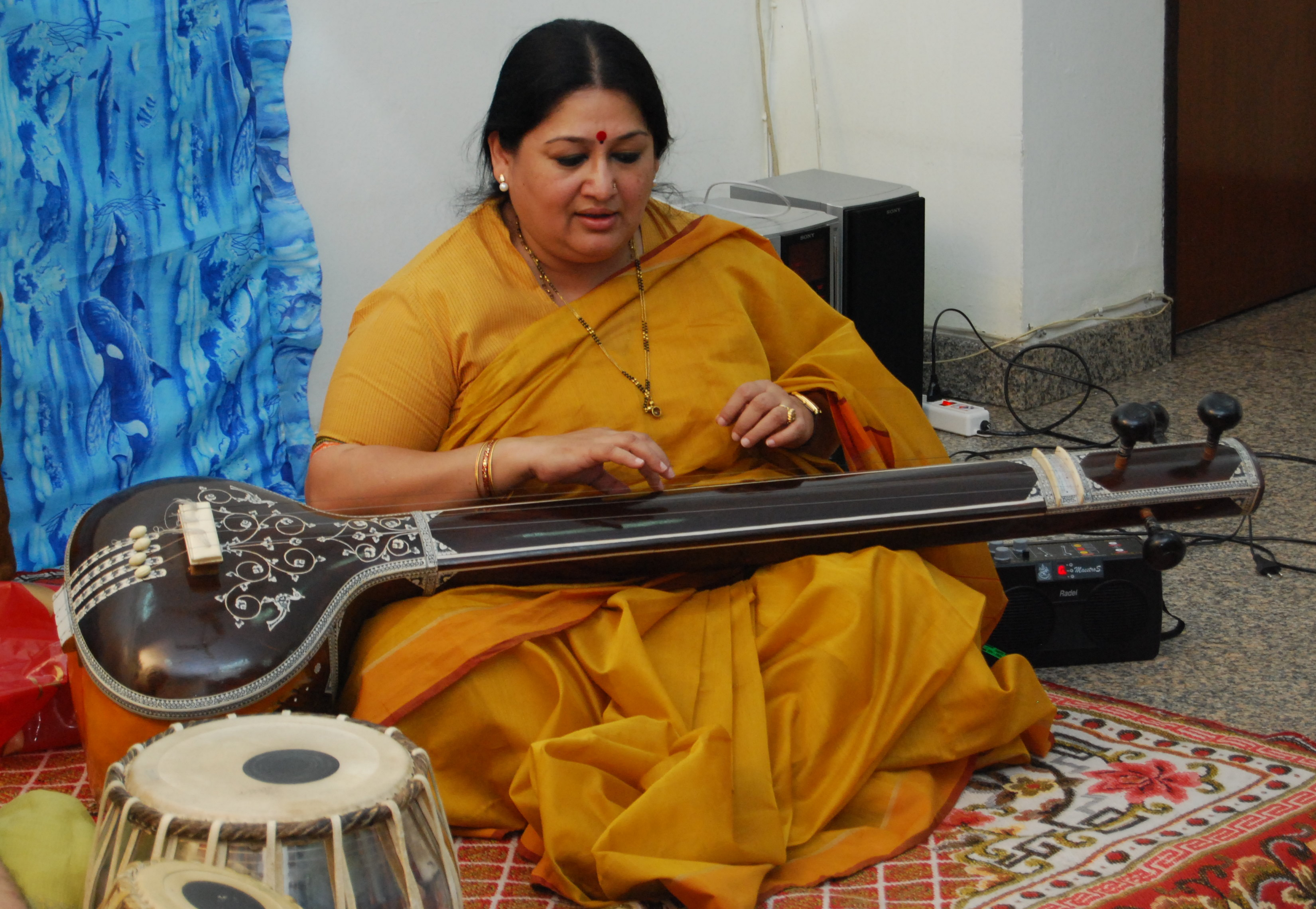
Indian tanpura resembles a sitar but has no frets

== Mathematics and music ==
Frets on lutes

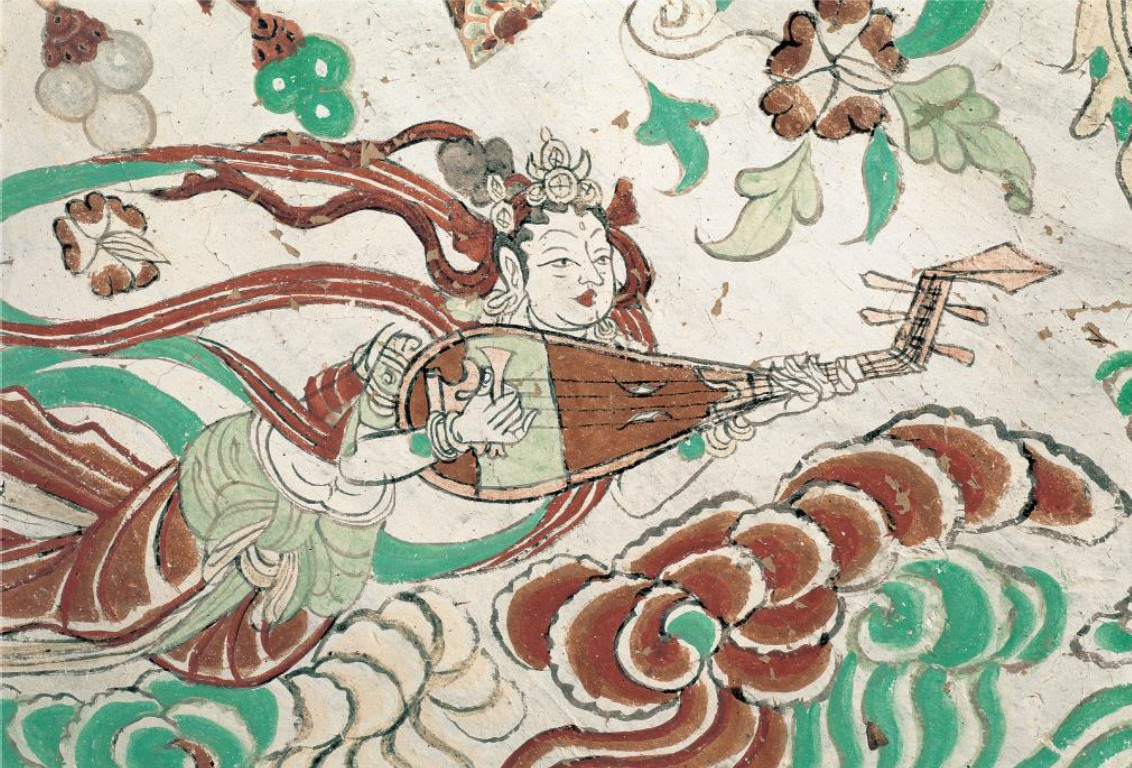
China. Pipa with frets, Middle Tang dynasty era (618–907 AD), from the Yulin Caves, cave 15

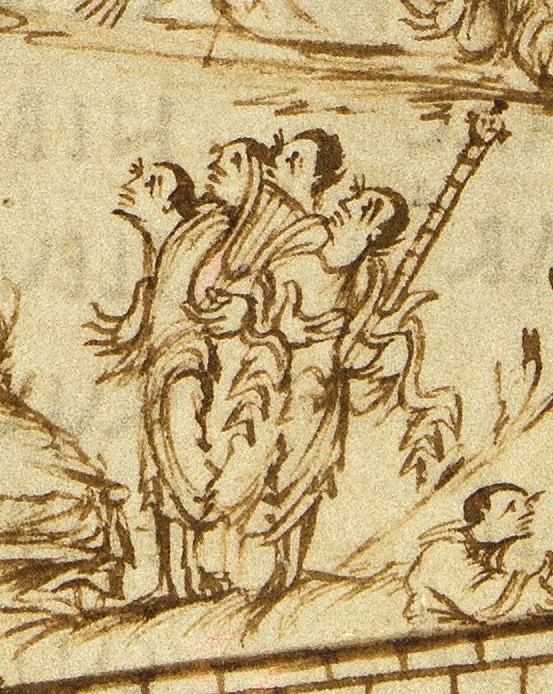
France, Utrecht Psalter, c. 850. During the Carolingian Renaissance an Anglo Saxon artist drew an image of a cythara with frets.

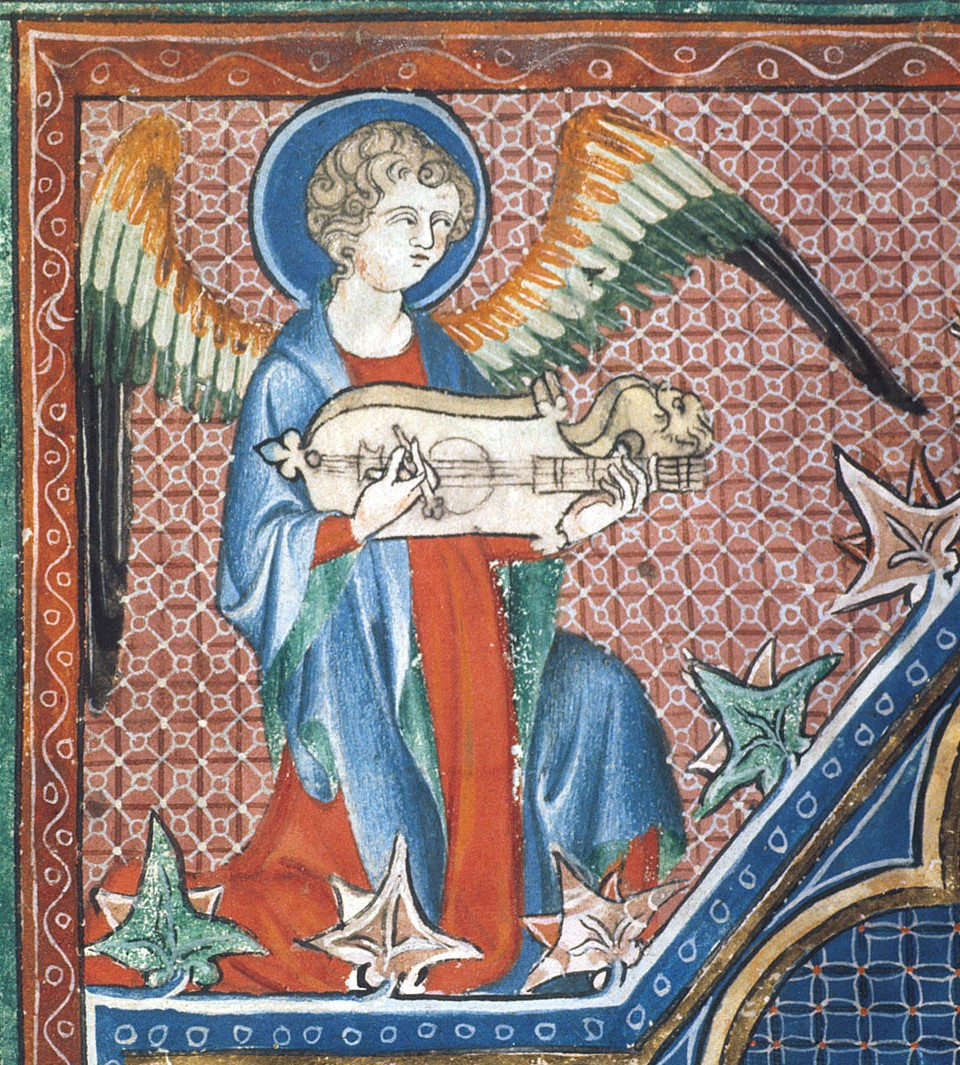
England, c. 1310 AD. Angel holding a citole. There are frets drawn over the body of the instrument, where it is unlikely that gut frets could be placed.

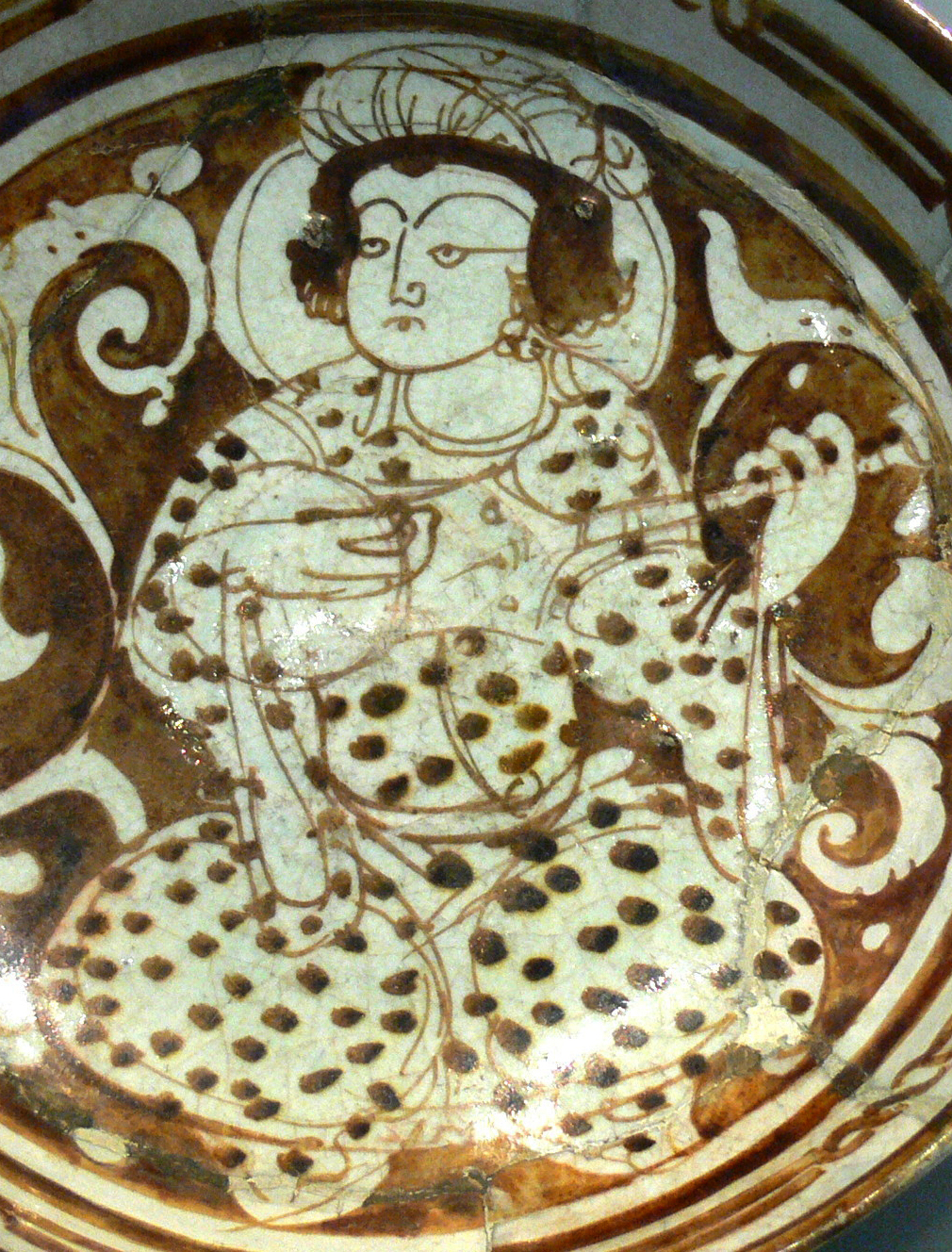
Ravy, (near Tehran), Iran, c. 1200 AD rubab with frets.

=== Strings are mathematical ===
The lute is tied to the mathematics related to pitches. Unlike the harp, in which a string produces a single note, a lute string produces more than one note. Placing a finger on a string divides the string into measurable parts. Measuring those parts leads to mathematical ratios, useful in placing frets on the neck of the lute. An instrument such as the setar uses moveable frets to hit whole tones, half tones and quarter tones.

It isn't known when frets were first used. Some ancient images discovered in the Middle East from before 1000 BC appear to show frets. These are rare and most images do not show frets on the early lutes.

A rare example from about the 3rd century AD was discovered in 1907 in the Niya ruins in Xinjiang, China, a broken lute's neck with two gut frets intact. The neck and pegbox of the lute are similar to the lute painted on the wall in the Dingjiazha Tomb No. 5 (384–441 AD), which also has frets. Buddhist artworks from the 6th-10th centuries AD in the Mogao Caves (558-907 AD) and Yulin Caves (618-907 AD) appear to have frets. Some long lutes in the Utrecht Psalter (c. 850 AD) in France also appear fretted, as do citoles from Spain in the Cantigas de Santa Maria (c. 1280).

=== Bringing order to infinite number of pitches ===
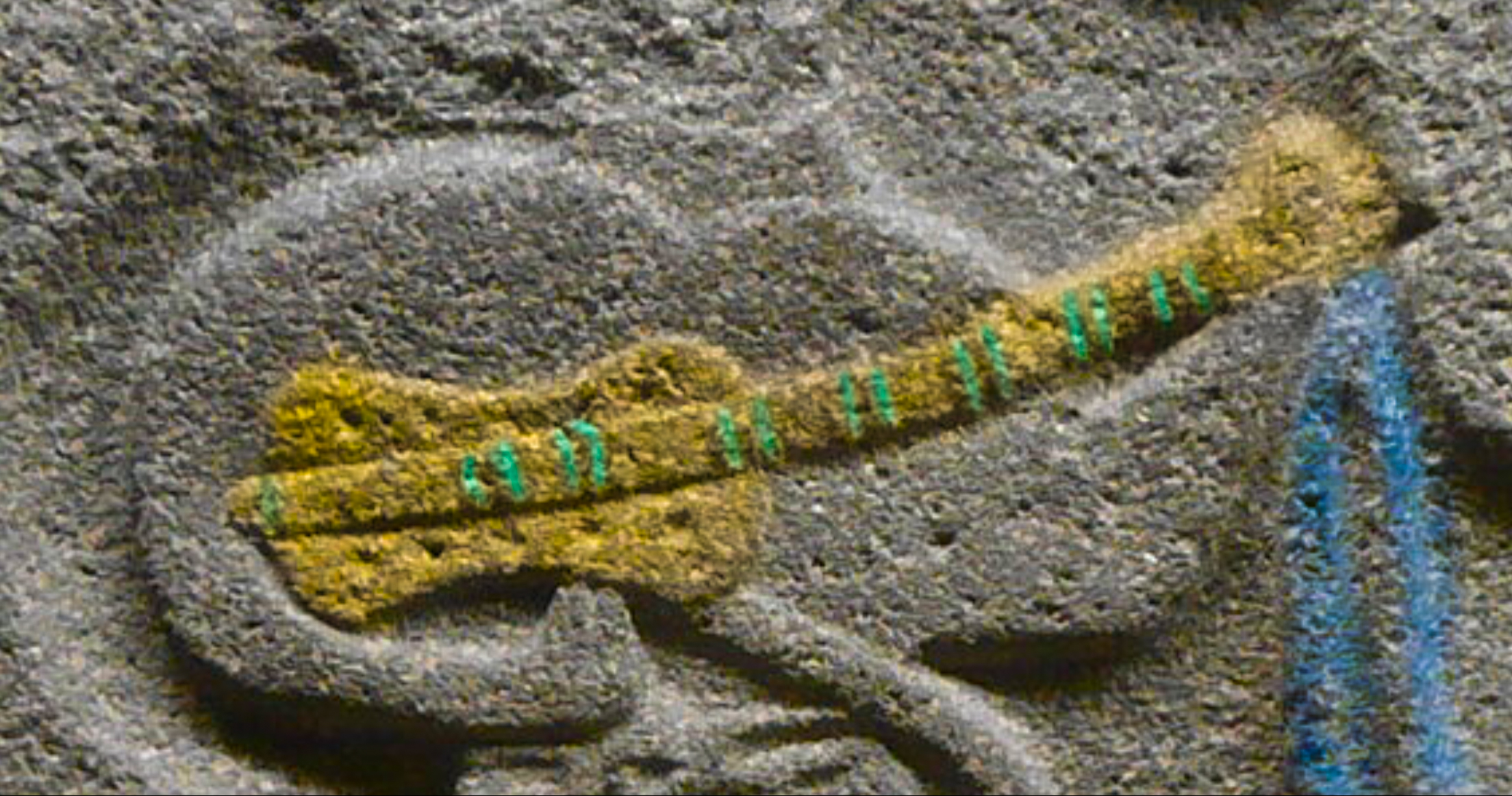
Turkey. Hittite lute from Alacahöyük 1399–1301 BC colored to estimate frets.

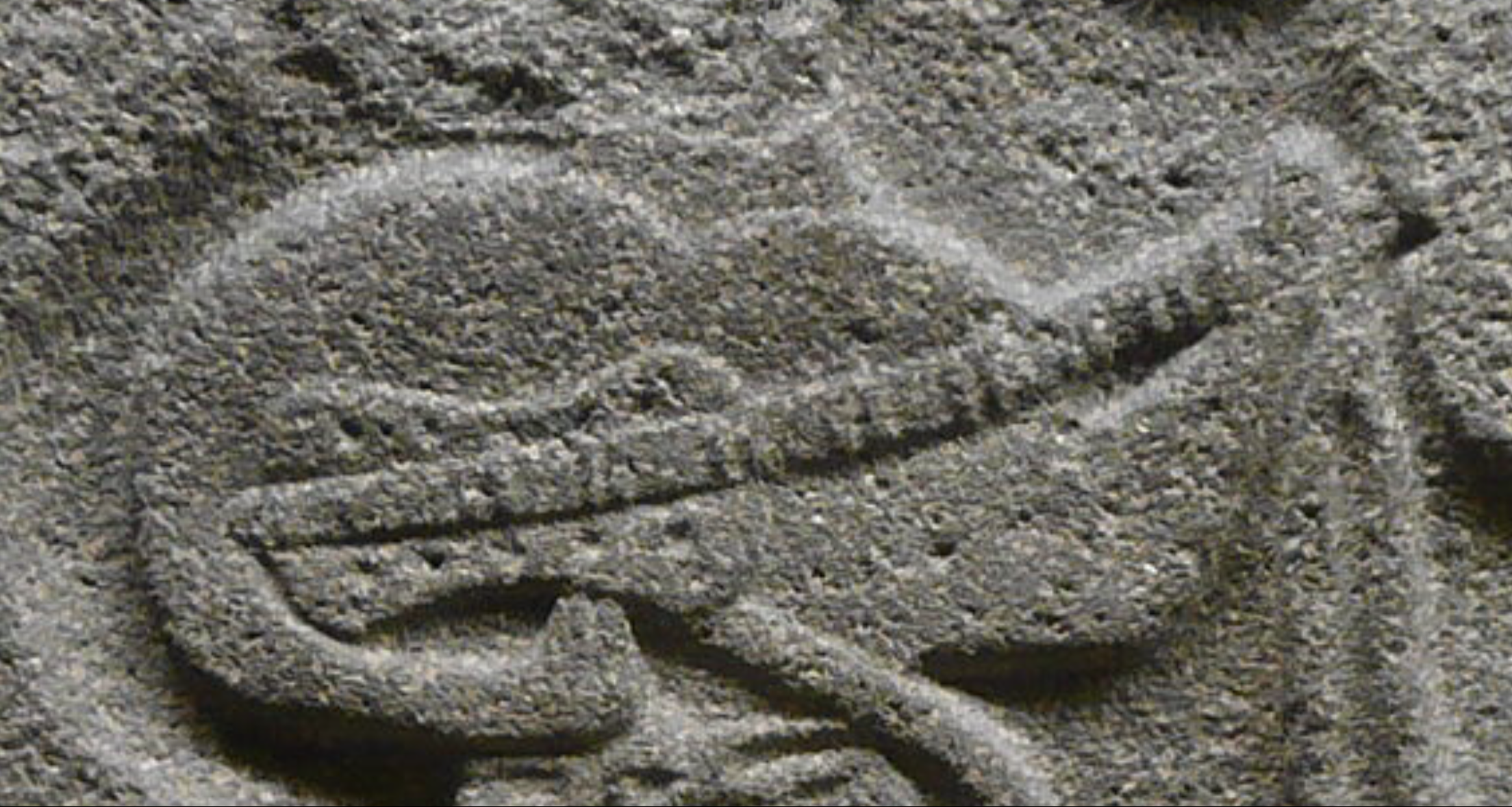
Relief sculpture offers clues to frets, but may be difficult to see. In this image, frets on the body may not be frets, but loops where the stick goes in and out of the skin soundboard. Holes above and below the stick are sound holes.

Richard Dumbrill talked about the earliest known systems of musical notes, and what makes them feel natural. He concluded that what makes a mode "feel intrinsic is centuries of usage". For the Sumerians, natural was a five-note system. For the Akkadians, natural was a nine-note system and then a seven-note system, "the basis for our modern [western] system".

With a seeming infinite number of possible pitches to create modes, musicians had to choose which notes to use, and which to play together. One way of bring order to the infinite number of tones was to examine music with mathematics.

The Sumerians and Akkadians, the Greeks, and the Persians all used math to create notes used on lutes and lyres and other stringed instruments. Using the idea that a plucked or bowed string produces a note, they noticed the difference in tone when a string is stopped. "The great discovery" was hearing the double octave, that halving a string produces a note one octave above the string. Written as a ratio 2:1.

They measured the ratios of string lengths on one side and the other of where the string was pressed, creating ratios. Those ratios allowed them to compare sounds, for example third intervals, fourths, fifths. They were able to tune one string against another in those intervals on lutes, lyres, harps, zithers. Those lutes that had frets gave them the further ability to reliably find those intervals on a played string, by marking points on the neck at mathematically spaced distances based on the ratios. Unlike modern instruments, where frets may be permanently fixed into the neck, as on a guitar, the older instruments used gut strings tied around the neck for frets, and this made their instruments adjustable. Early musicians could tune their instruments to different modes. Lute players could tune the strings to different intervals, and could further adjust the frets for the modes.

=== Knowledge passed back and forth between cultures ===
See: Transmission of the Greek Classics

Western scholarship has traditionally credited the Greeks, including Pythagoras (c. 570 – c. 495 BC), with discovery of this math to determine notes on strings, called Pythagorean tuning, which covers western tuning based on perfect 5ths and octaves. However, as modern scholars have looked at cuneiform texts, it is clear that the Greeks were not the first; recorded thinking in Mesopotamia about the mathematical ratios of strings predates the Greek thinking by at least 1500 years. Furthermore, a form of written music came out of that era, called the Hurrian songs, currently the oldest known written music, and is based on modes of music, recorded in cuneiform string ratios.

Once the Persian and Arab thinkers from the Umayyad and Abbasid periods (7th to 13th centuries AD) had translations of Greek manuscripts, they began to study music as a science as part of "mathematical arts".

Some Muslim musicians came to have access to more than one mathematically created scale, such as the Persian scale, the Arab scale and the Pythagorean scale.

=== Thinkers and polymaths of Central Asia and Arabia ===
See: Golden Age of Islam

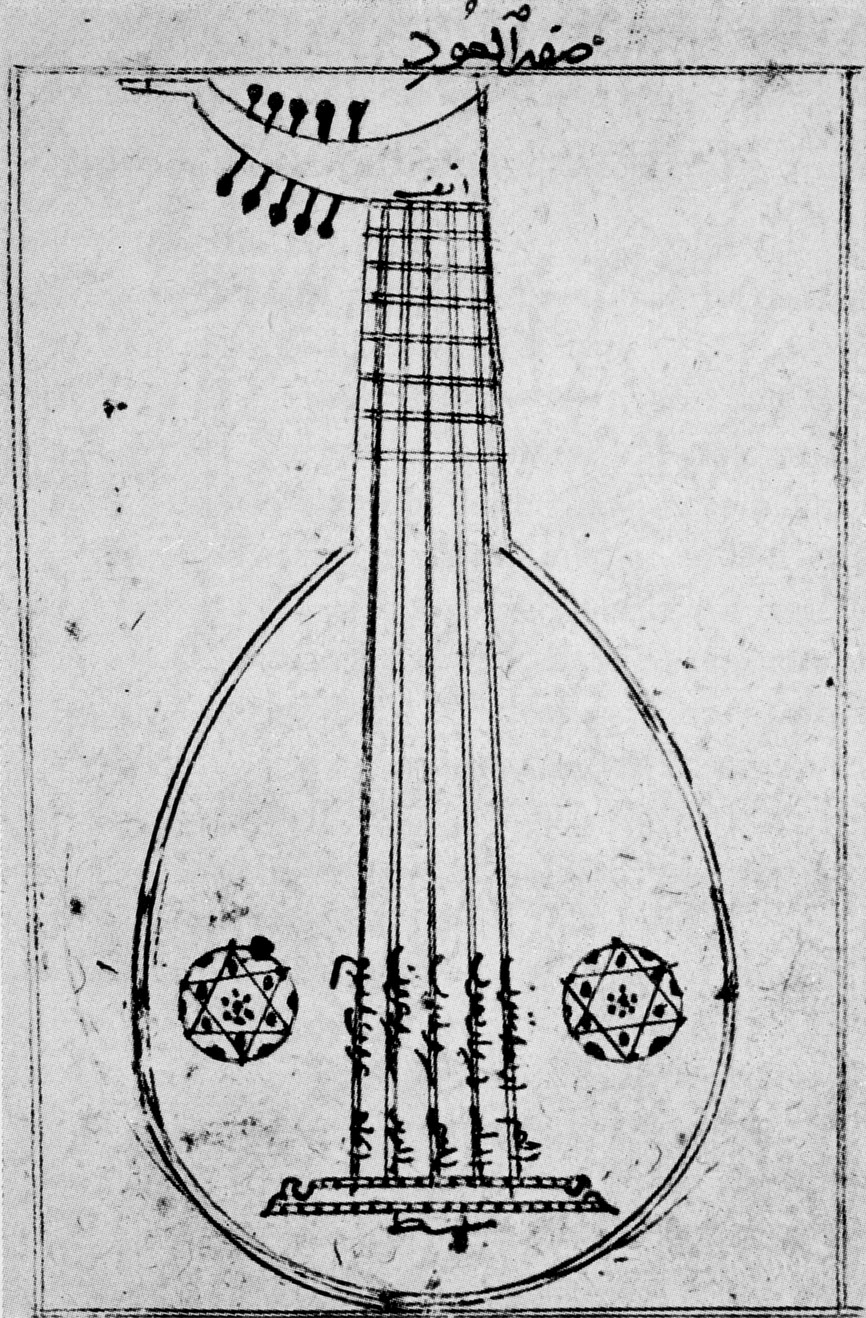
Iraq. Drawing of a lute by Safi al-Din from a 1333 copy of his book, Kitab al-Adwār.

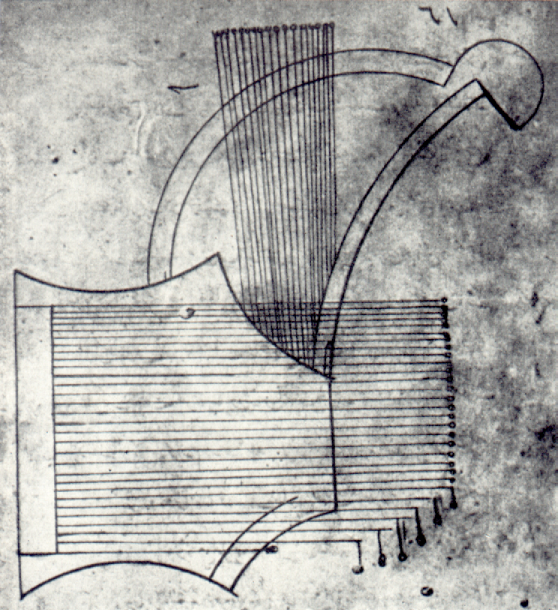
Illustration from Al-Fārābī (about 870-950): Kitāb al-mūsīqī al kabīr Drawing of a musical instrument, called ""šāh-rūd"")

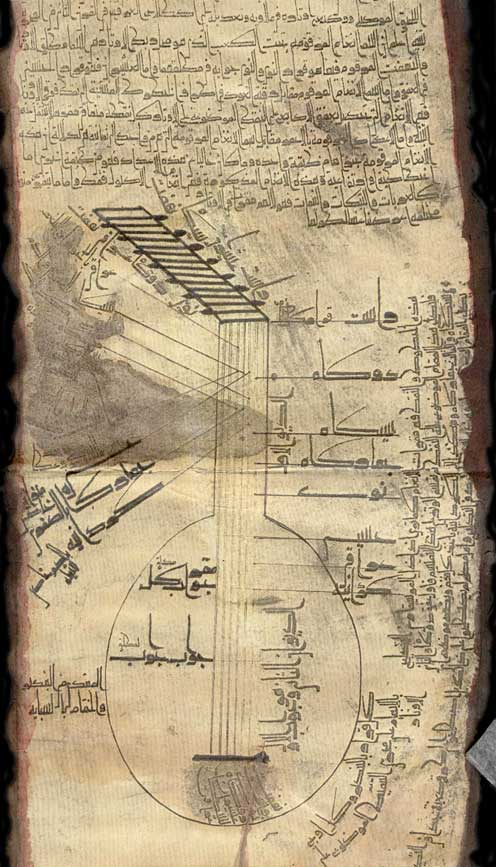
Al-Farabi's oud design, with 7 courses (fourteen-strings).

The mixing cultures of Central Asia and Arabia produced several thinkers who wrote about music, including something about the lute in their works, including Al-Kindi (c. 801 – c. 873), Ziryab (789–857), Al-Farabi (c. 872 – c. 950), Avicenna (c. 980 – 1037), and Safi al-Din al-Urmawi (1216–1294). They wrote in Arabic, what had become the useful lingua-Franca of their time, and took part in Muslim society and culture. They weren't solely working in the Middle East; Islam was spread wide and some of the thinkers were from Central Asia.

The Arabs had a musical scale, described by al-Farabi, in use by some through the 13th century AD. That tanbar scale, which divided the string into "40 equal parts" may have been a leftover from Babylon and Assyria. However, the Arabs traded with and conquered the Persians, and they adopted Persian scales for their lutes, just as they adopted Persian short-necked lutes.

Ziryab moved from Baghdad to al-Andalus, where he set up a school of music and was one of the first to add a fifth string or course to oud, "between 822 and 852). Al-Andalus, where he settled would become a center of musical instrument development for Europe.

Al-Kindi was a polymath who wrote as many as 15 music-related treatises. He was among the first to apply Greek musical theory to Central Asian-Arabian short lutes. He added a semitone between the nut and the first fret. He also added a fifth string to his oud in the east, as Ziryab had done in the west.

Al-Farabi "fully incorporated the works of Aristoxenus and Ptolemy into his theory of tetrachords", and wrote among books in many subjects, the Kitab al-Musiqa al-Kabir, the Major Book of Music, in which he detailed how to tune an oud, using mathematical ratios. He gave instruction for both 10 frets and 12, telling where to place the tied (and moveable) gut-string frets on the neck. His way of tuning allowed a "12-fret 'ud tuning — which results ... 'double-octave' scale", with 22 notes in each octave.

== Short-necked lutes ==
Central Asia to China and Europe

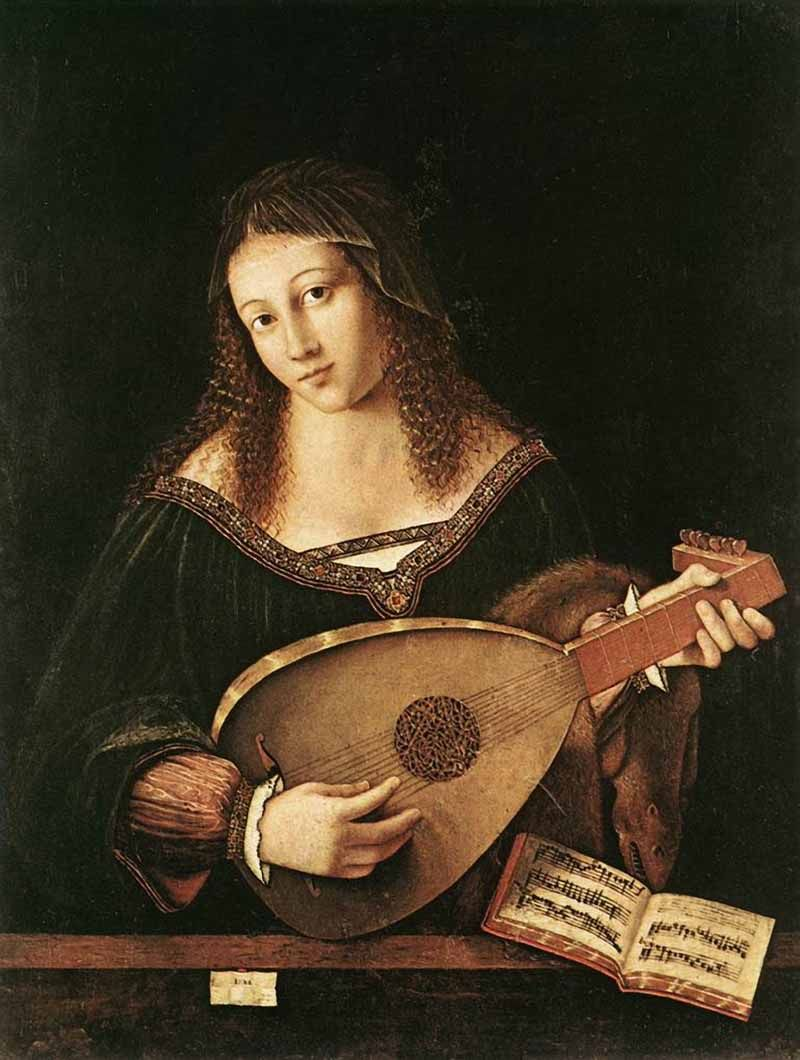
European lute painting by Bartolomeo Veneto, c. 1500. By the early modern era, European lutes were built from strips of wood and a separate neck.

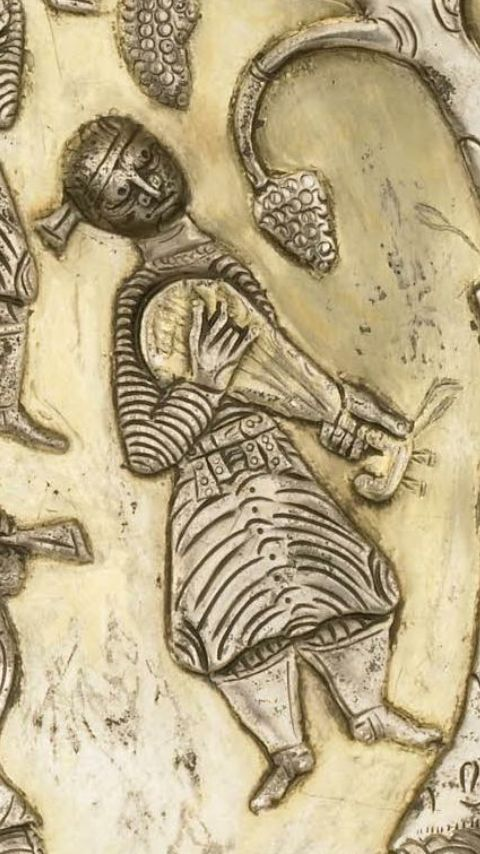
Tabaristan, Iran, from a decorated dish, Sasanian (7th–8th centuries AD). Marks around edge of lute might indicate a skin top.

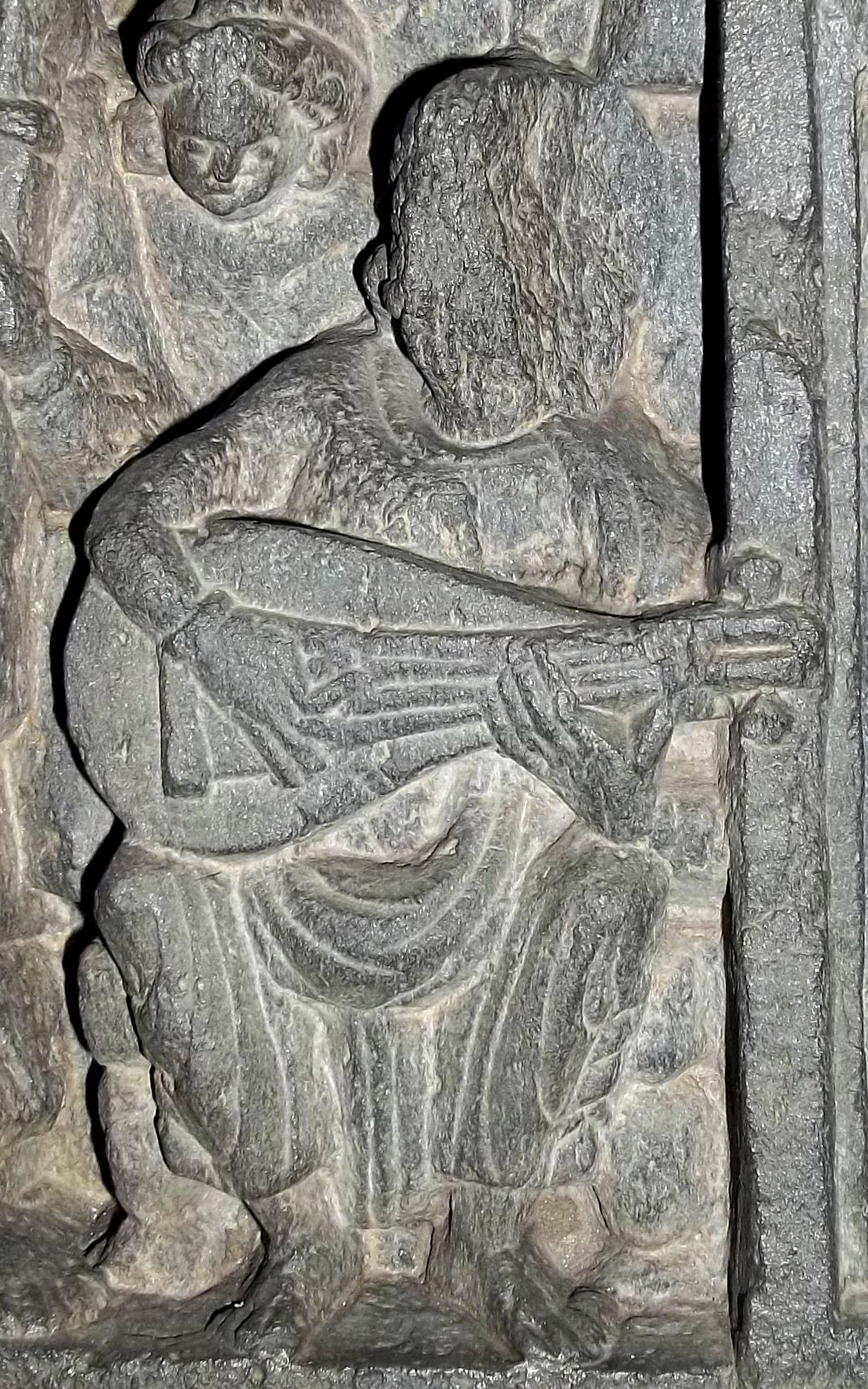
"Siddhartha" playing a lute-type instrument. Gandaran art. Date not given for artwork. The era for grey schist art was the 1st–6th centuries AD.

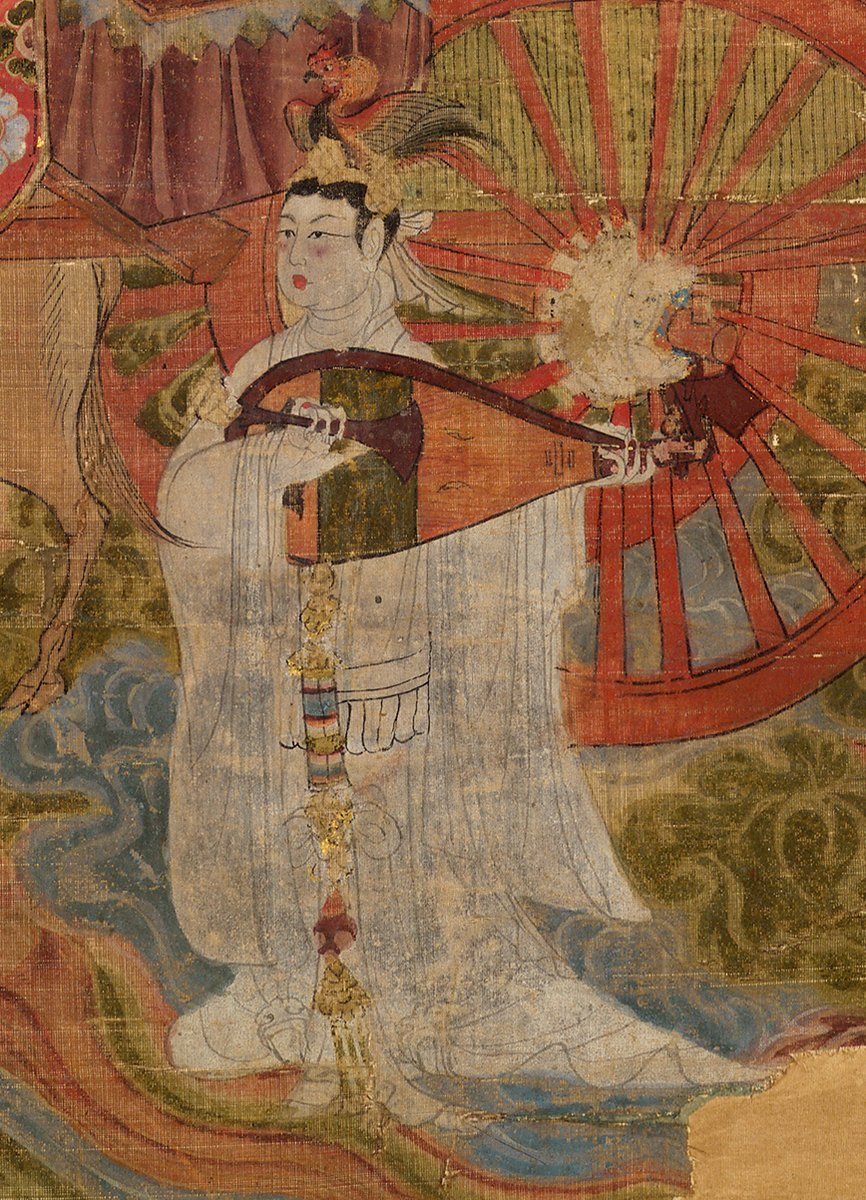
Lute or pipa detail from a Tang dynasty painting on silk, 897 AD.

From Central Asia, the short-necked lute went east to China and west to Europe and Africa by way of Persia and Arabia. The area of origin borders on North India as well, and short-necked lutes can be seen in artwork that are a mixture of Hellenistic and Indian or Kushite art forms, from as early as the 1st to 3rd centuries AD.

Although the oldest iconographic evidence concerning lutes deals with long lutes in Mesopotamia and Egypt, some long-necked lutes are shorter than others. Comparatively, the Greek and Byzantine pandura is shorter than the tanbur, even though both are long lutes. Shorter lutes exist among the long-necked lutes today, including the tanburica, cura and komuz.

A short necked lute does not necessarily a small lute, as a guitar or pipa can be a large instrument. Guitars have a sound box as long as the neck. Some members of the rubab family with their long sound-boxes fit into the group of short-necked lutes.

The line of short-necked lutes developed to the east of Mesopotamia, in Central Asia, places like Bactria and Gandhara. There a short, almond-shaped lute surfaced, carried east and west by Sogdiana merchants, become the Chinese pipa and Middle Eastern oud. Curt Sachs talked about the depictions of Gandharan lutes in art, where they are presented in a mix of "Northwest Indian art" under "a strong Greek influence". The short-necked lutes in these Gandhara artworks were "the venerable ancestor of the Islamic, the Sino-Japanese and the European lute families". He described the Gandhara lutes as having a "pear-shaped body tapering towards the short neck, a frontal stringholder, lateral pegs, and either four or five strings".

While the earliest may be in the Gandhara region, Northern India itself also has ancient short-necked lutes in sculpture, such as one found at Pawāyā, Madhya Pradesh, India, that dates to the Gupta period, 400–499 AD. Southern India too has early images of lutes, including 2nd-3rd century AD artwork at the Amaravati Stupa, where a large bodied, short-necked lute is carved into the relief sculpture. Another South India artwork showing a lute is found in the 450-490 AD painting, Padmapani Bodhisattva in the Ajanta Caves.

Much of short lute development happened in the Central Asian area between India, China and Persia. Early short lutes were carved out of a single block of wood (monoxle), not built up in a box or bowl-like modern lutes. An example is the barbat which has been called ancestral to both skin-topped instruments like the gambus as well as to larger wood-topped instruments such as the oud. Names were reused or used across multiple instruments over the millennia; the rabab group is an example of that. The family included short lute-shaped instruments, to larger lutes with multiple chambers (some covered with wood, some with skin), to long-necked lutes that retained the multiple sound chambers and skin over the bowl. Some rababs were plucked, some bowed.

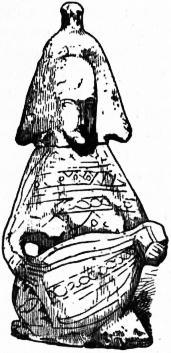
Statuette of a lute found in Egypt, attributed to the 20th dynasty (1189–1077 BC). No short lute tradition remained there by the 1st century AD.

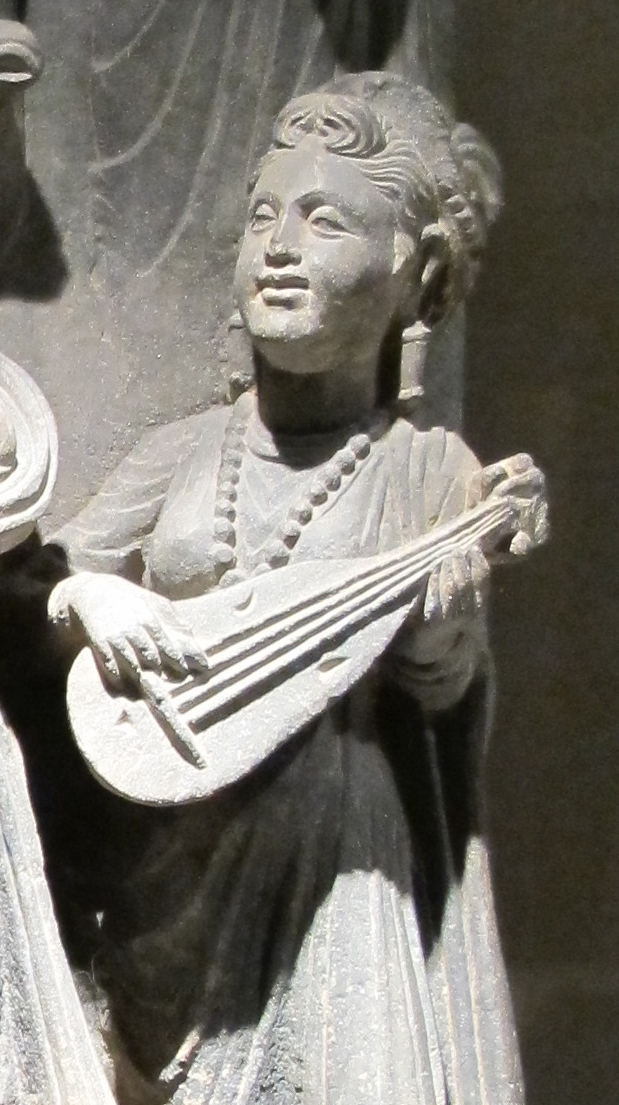
Musician playing for a dance, Gandhara, 2nd-4th century AD.

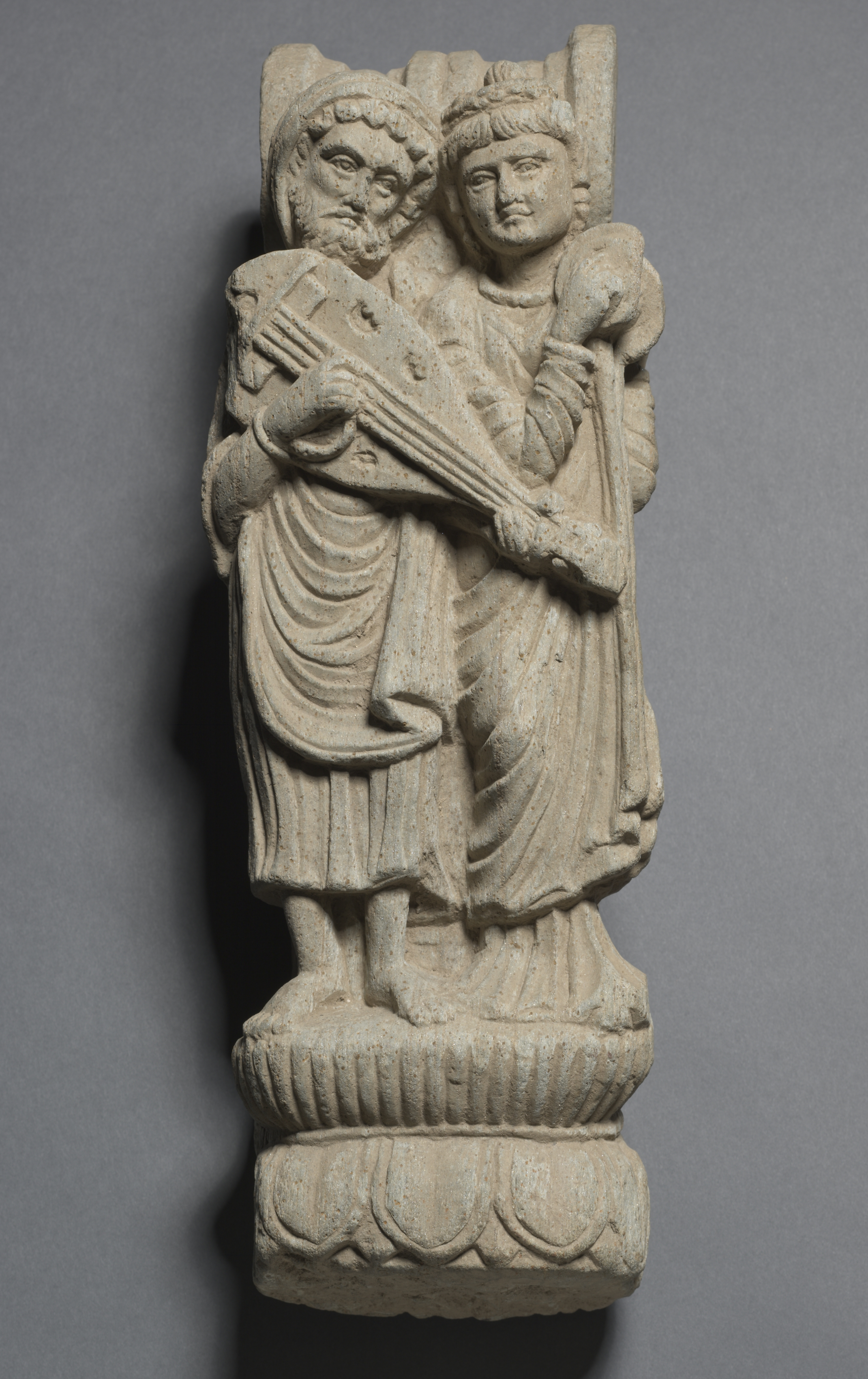
Pakistan. Lute in Gandhara, probably Butkara in Swat, Kushan period (1st century-320)

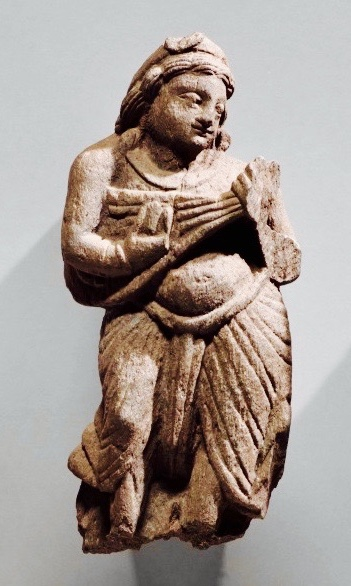
Pakistan. Gandhara lute, Swat Valley, 4th-5th century.

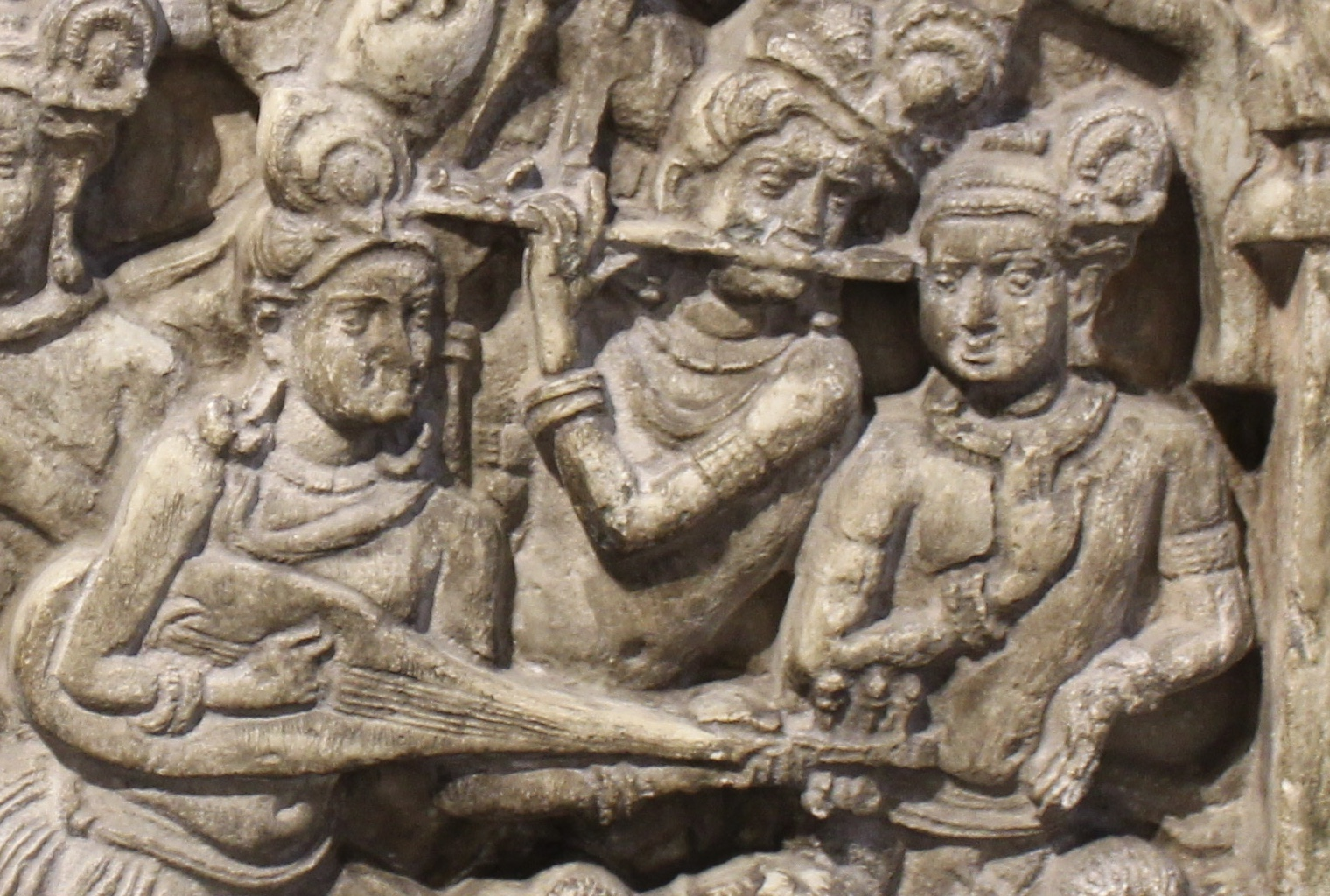
India. Lute in life scenes of Buddha-2nd century AD, Amaravati Stupa, Guntur district, Andhra Pradesh. This lute may have been developed into the veena.

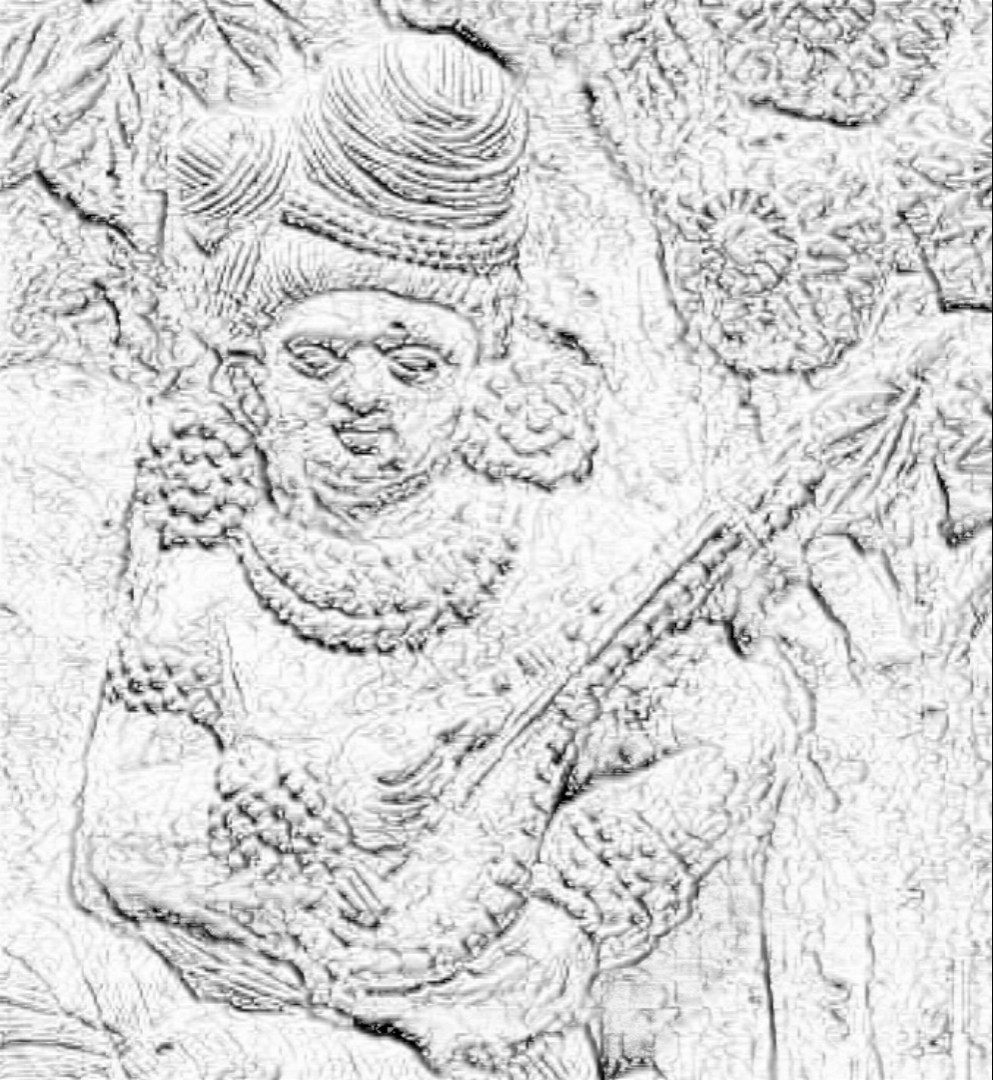
India, Chandraketugarh, 2nd-1st century BC Veena or possibly tanbura or sitar.

== Central Asia, the crossroads of civilizations ==
See: History of Central Asia

Central Asian music in China

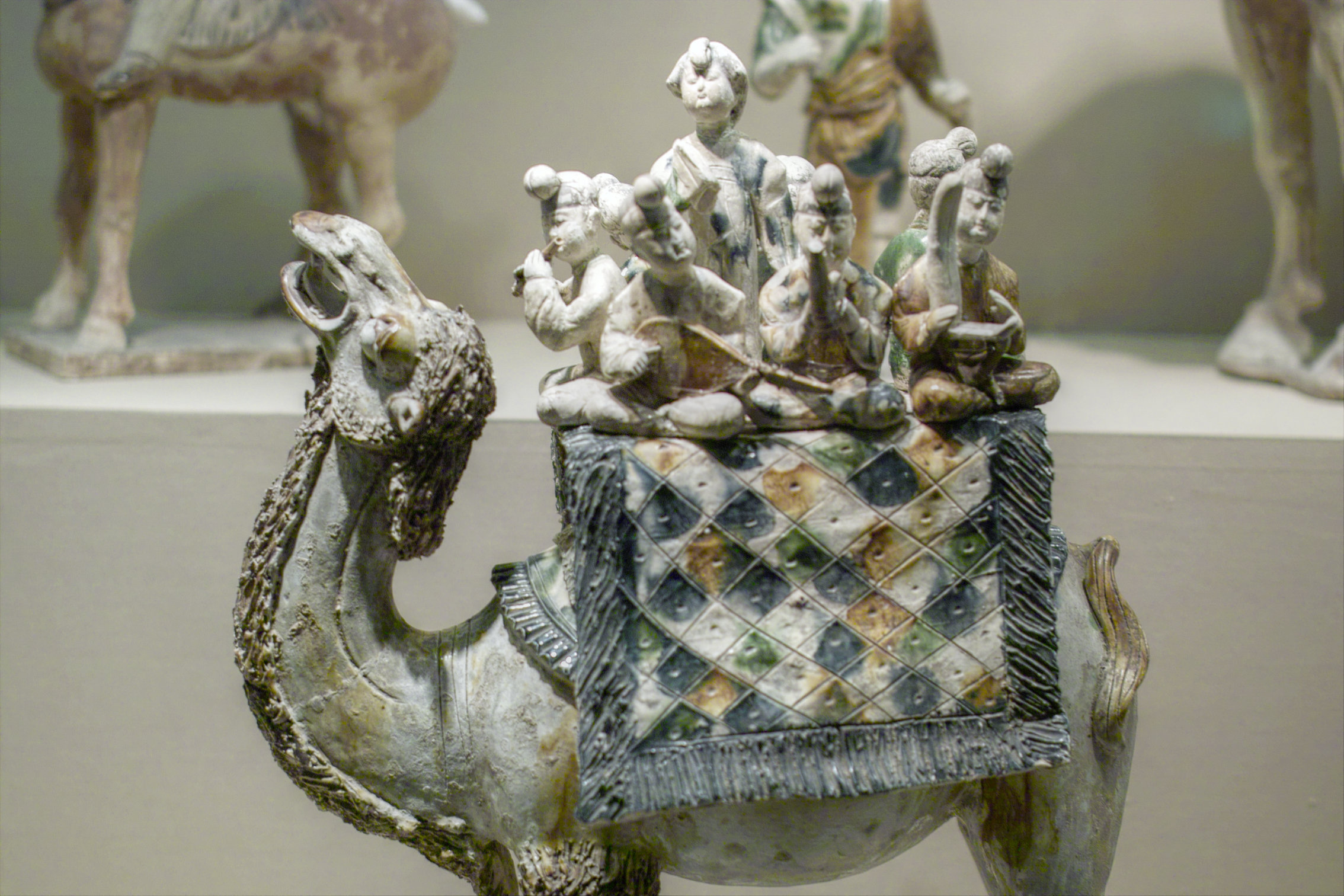
Tang dynasty art. Musicians on a camel, including one playing the lute. A similar artwork shows a group of bearded foreign musicians together on camelback. Tang dynasty (618–907 AD) Excavated from a Tang dynasty tomb, Zhongbu village, western suburb of Xi'an City. Kept at Shaanxi History Museum, Xi'an

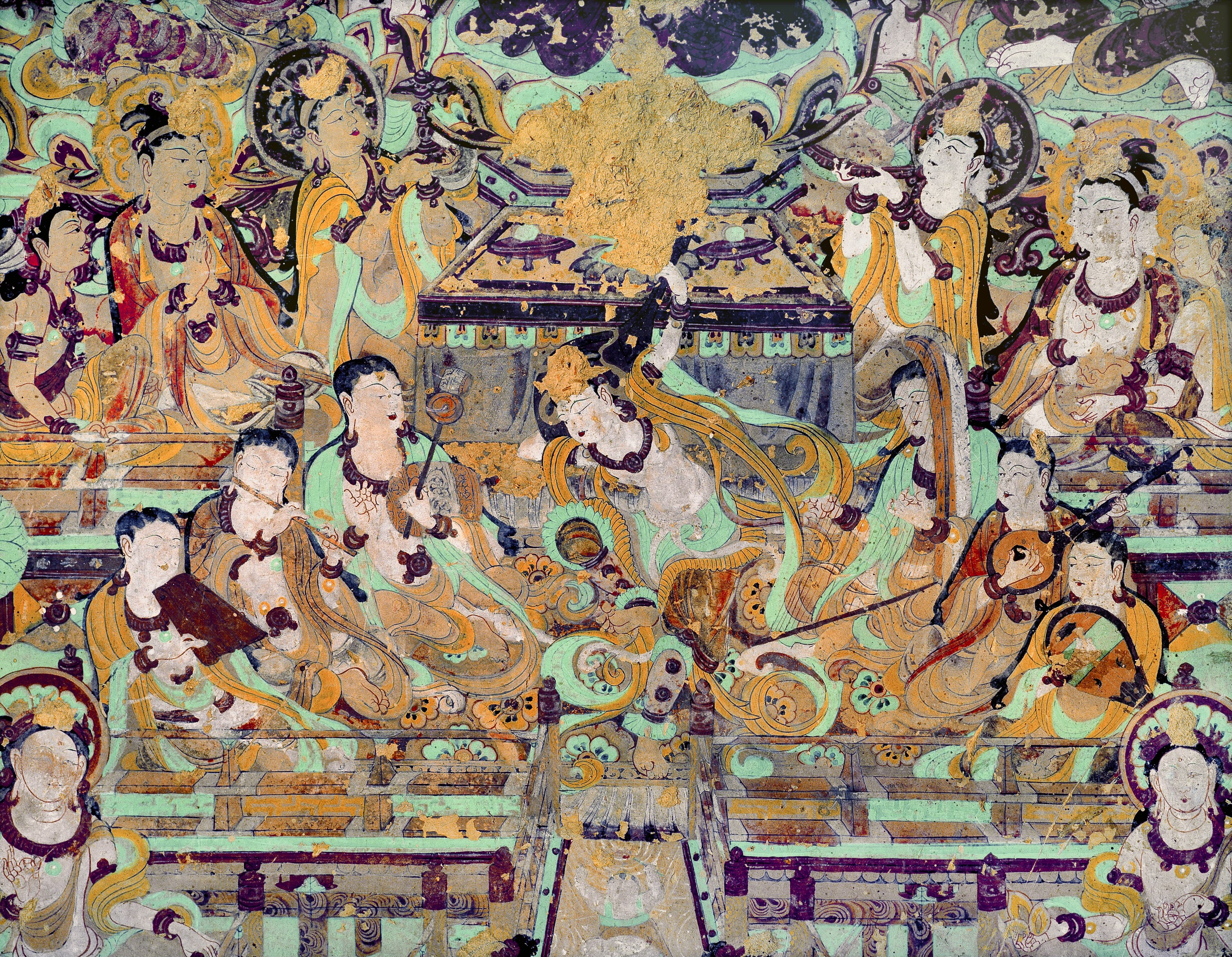
Buddhist painting from the Mogao Caves, 762–827 AD. A dancer spins while the orchestra plays. Three kinds of lutes are present: large pipa with dancer, smaller pipa on far right side lower. Above that is a long-necked sanxian or possibly tanbur-relation. Dancer with lifted leg, a posture that may have been the Sogdian Whirl; it has been recreated in China today, called Pipa dance 反弹琵琶 (Fǎntán pípá).

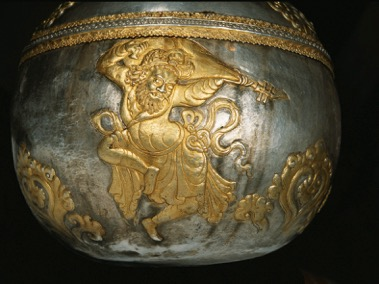
Dancer in the Sogian Whirl posture, lute held behind his head, 8th-century AD wine jug from Tadzhikistan, "in Sogdian style with Sasanian influence", at the Jokhang temple, Tibet, PRC.

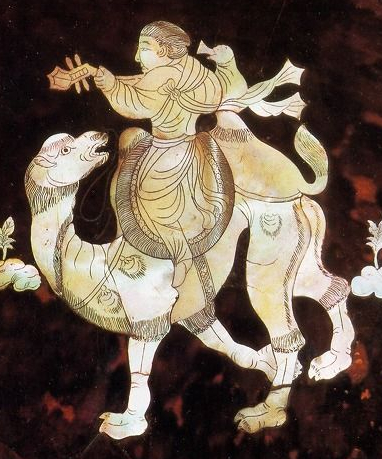
Engraving from Tang dynasty era pipa, gift from the Chinese emperor to the Japanese emperor. Along with the oldest known pipa, the Japanese court also preserved a version of the Central Asian dances from Kucha into the modern era.

Central Asian traders bridged Byzantium and the Middle East with China and India, with their caravan's of traders. The Sogdians (their main city was Samarkland) were especially famous as traders. Because of them, the Chinese Emperor could drink wine from Roman glasses with his wife and do the "Sogdian Whirl". In 384 AD, the Chinese conquered Kucha, which was famous for its music and dance. It is in the area of the Kizil Caves, whose paintings make it clear that a variety of lutes were being invented and played in the region. The Kuchean dances were popular in the Chinese court, and are still preserved today in the Japanese imperial court, where a trader with lute can be seen on the 5-string-pipa from Central Asia, a gift of one emperor to another.

It has been argued that Central Asia, a crossroads of multiple civilizations, the Middle East, Europe, China and India, could itself constitute a center of world civilization. It was described by the Greek geographer, Strabo, as "a land of 1000 cities". The peoples there could be loosely called Iranians, the historic tribes, not only citizens of the modern country. Over a period of centuries Central Asia was conquered by people from different cultures including the Greeks, Kushans, various Turkic tribes, Persians (themselves an Iranian tribe), Arabs and Mongols. The result was a blending of the cultures, and Central Asia grew prosperous in spite of the invasions.

When the Arabs conquered Central Asia, they were conquering a culture that specialized in taking things, evaluating them for their potential value and improving on them. Their habit of evaluating applied to products to sell and to ideas. Central Asia was pluralistic and diverse and had some of the biggest cities on the planet, with books being "numerous and widespread", and a high rate of literacy, in which even women could read and write. The culture of literacy and evaluation continued after the Arabs burned the Central Asian libraries (an attempt to do away with competing ideas).

Arabic became a lingua-franca, joining Central Asia with the wider Muslim academic world.

Having access to Greek philosophy, including Plato and Aristotle long before the European Renaissance, Central Asian polymaths debated the Greek ideas and engaged in science and philosophy. They created climate of intellectual development which helped to bring about the European Renaissance.

Among the products manufactured and exported to China were "lutes, harps, transverse flutes, both plucked and bowed stringed instruments, and even Central Asian dances." One of the peoples, the Sogdians were successful merchants for centuries and traveled to Europe, China and India. They took their music and dances with them, and the Sogdian Whirl, became popular in China. Another group from Central Asia was the people of Kucha, whose music and dances were popular in the Imperial Court, and which have survived in the Japanese Imperial Court into the modern era.

=== Pipa, ruan and yueqin ===
Early pipas

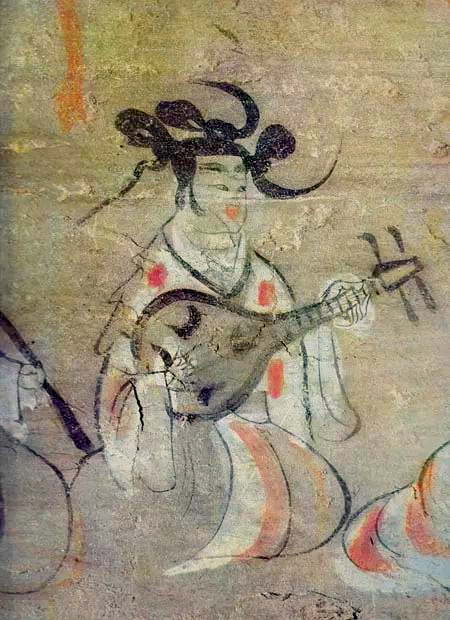
Early depiction of pear-shaped lute or pipa in China from Dingjiazha Tomb No. 5, at end of Sixteen Kingdoms and beginning of Northern Wei dynasty eras (384–441 AD)

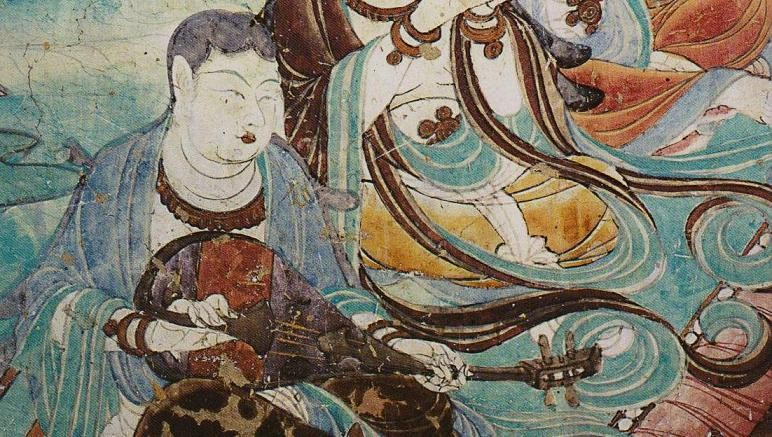
5-string pipa, Tang dynasty period (618–907 AD), south wall of Yulin cave 25. The painting appears to depict the instrument with frets.

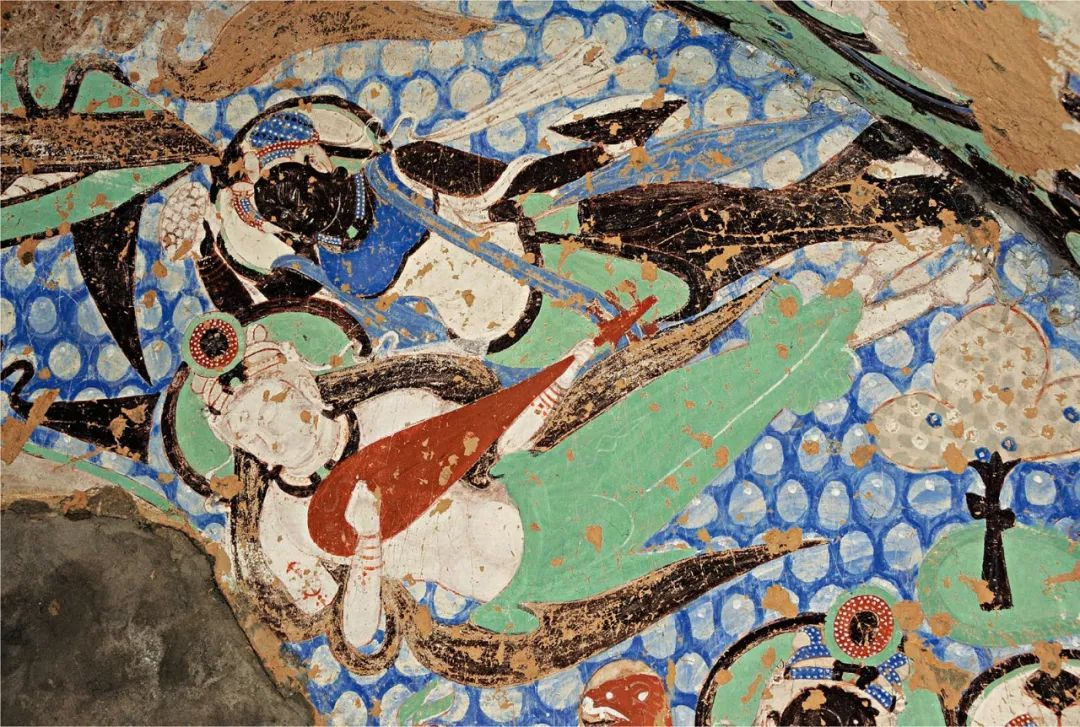
5-string pipa, 6th century, from the Kizil Caves, cave 8

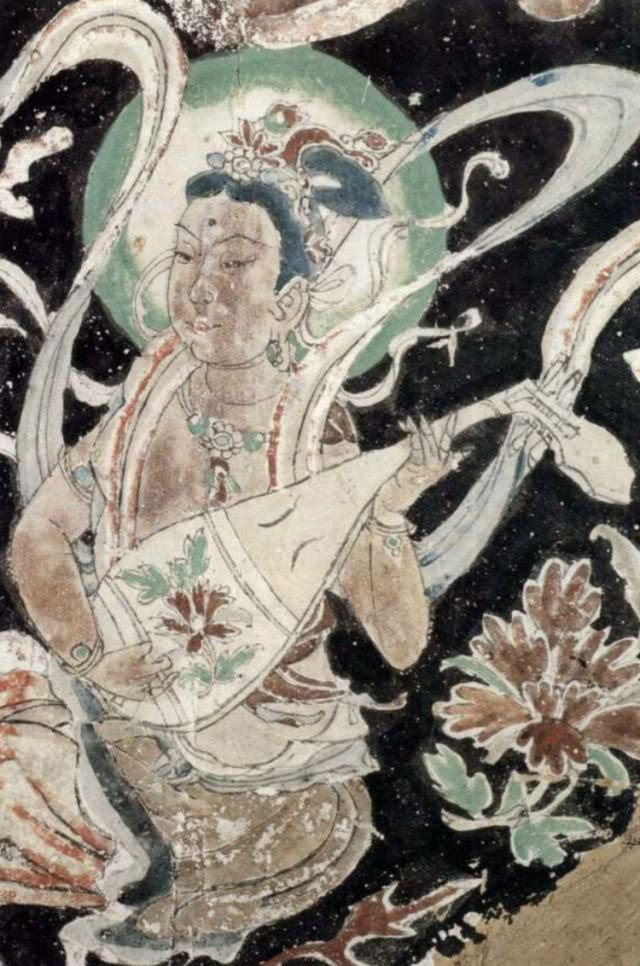
Pipa from Yulin caves, cave 10, Western Xia period 1028–1227.

=== Pipa ===
The pear-shaped pipa is likely to have been introduced to China from Central Asia, Gandhara, and/or India. Pear-shaped lutes have been depicted in Kusana sculptures from the 1st century AD.

The pear-shaped pipa may have been introduced during the Han dynasty and was referred to as Han pipa. However, depictions of the pear-shaped pipas in China only appeared after the Han dynasty during the Jin dynasty in the late 4th to early 5th century.

A small pipa was found in murals of tombs in Liaoning (遼寧) province in northeastern China. The date of these tombs is about late Eastern Han (東漢) or Wei (魏) period (220–265 AD). However, the pear-shaped pipa was not brought to China from Dunhuang (敦煌, now in northwestern China) until the Northern Wei period (386–524 AD) when ancient China traded with the western countries through the Silk Road (絲綢之路). Evidence was shown on the Dunhuang Caves frescoes that the frescoes contain a large number of pipa, and they date to the 4th to 5th centuries.

The pipa acquired a number of Chinese symbolisms during the Han dynasty – the instrument length of three feet five inches represents the three realms (heaven, earth, and man) and the five elements, while the four strings represent the four seasons.

Depictions of the pear-shaped pipas appeared in abundance from the Northern and Southern dynasties (420 to 589) onwards, and pipas from this time to the Tang dynasty were given various names, such as Hu pipa (胡琵琶), bent-neck pipa (曲項琵琶, quxiang pipa), some of these terms, however, may refer to the same pipa. Apart from the four-stringed pipa, other pear-shaped instruments introduced include the five-stringed, straight-necked, wuxian pipa (五弦琵琶, also known as Kuchean pipa (龜茲琵琶)), a six-stringed version, as well as the two-stringed hulei (忽雷). From the 3rd century onwards, through the Sui and Tang dynasty, the pear-shaped pipas became increasingly popular in China. By the Song dynasty the word pipa was used to refer exclusively to the four-stringed pear-shaped instrument.

=== Ruan and yueqin ===
Early moon lutes

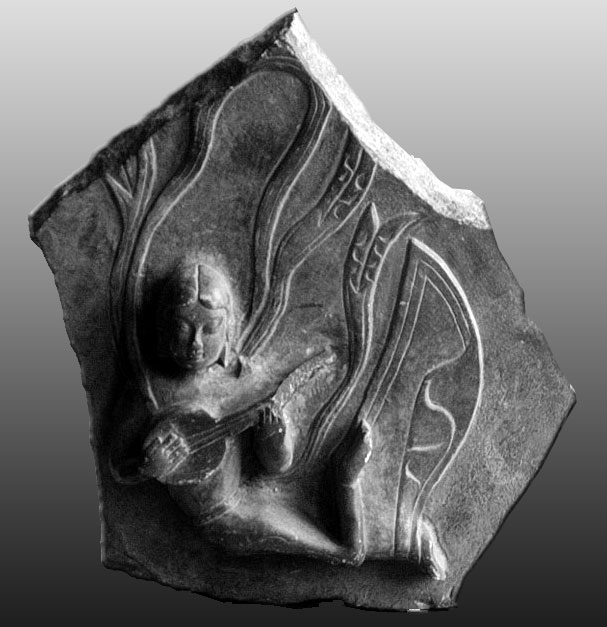
Apsara with sitar or yueqin, found at Luoyang; Longmen Caves. Northern Wei period (385–534 AD)

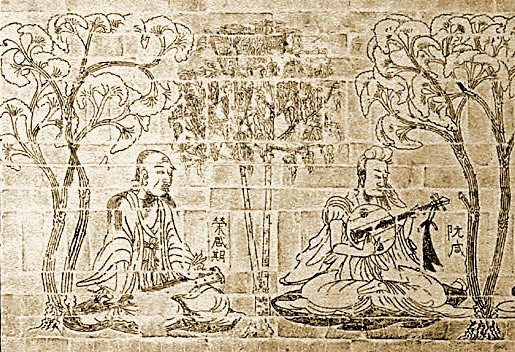
Xishan, Nanjing, tomb of the Eastern Jin dynasty, second half of the 5th century. Artwork: "Seven Sages of the Bamboo Grove and Rong Qiqi", shows Rong Qiqi (left) and Ruan Xian (playing a ruan or yueqin).

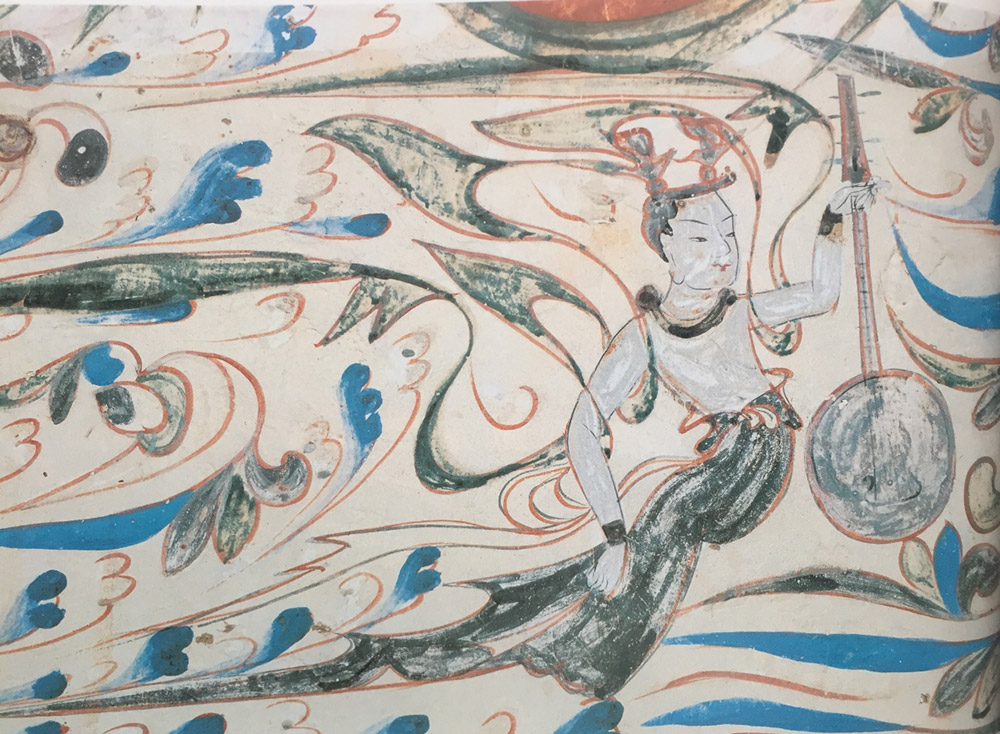
A lute resembling a yueqin moon lute, from the Western Wei dynasty 535–557, 285th Cave of Mogao Caves. Lutes like this have some resemblance to Southeast Asian moon lutes such as the chapey and the đàn nguyệt. Appears to have frets.

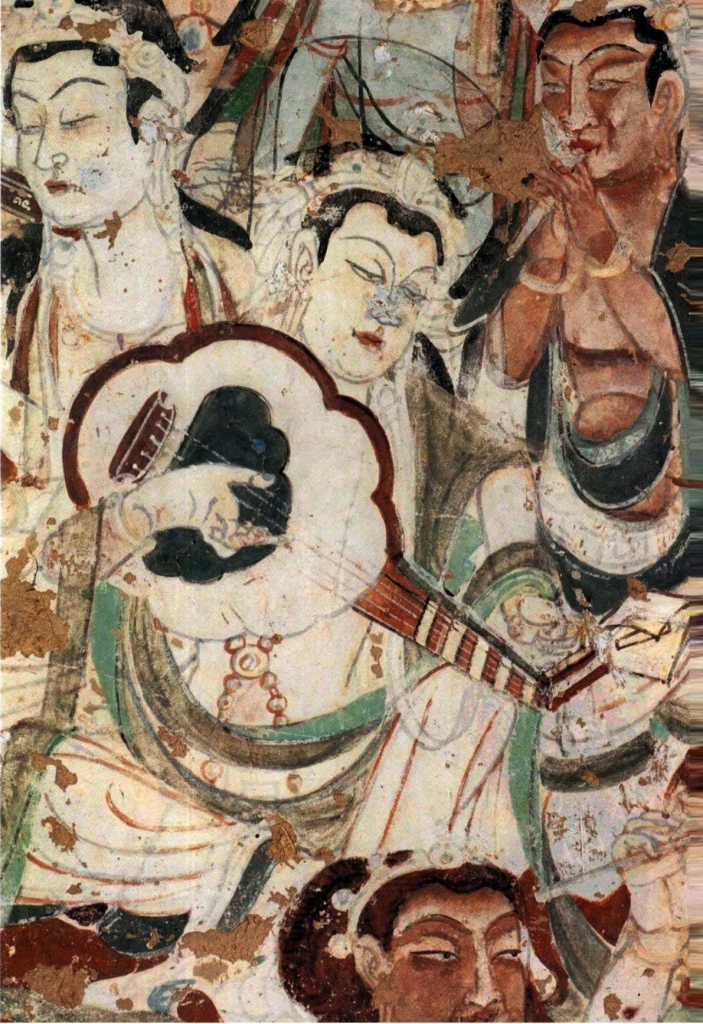
5-string lute from Mogao caves, cave 220, Tang dynasty 618–907. Body shape resembles qinqin or đàn sến, but different numbers of strings. Seems to have frets.

The moon lutes have become widespread. Versions of them can be found throughout China as the ruan family and also as the yueqin family. Moon lutes have spread south of the border where, in Southeast Asia, they have their own versions. The Southern China version of the yueqin, which may be related to the Southeast Asian moon lutes, has a longer neck than the northern version. The long-necked yueqin is being revived in Taiwan.

Another type of lute in China is the yueqin, a round-bodied instrument with flat top and back. According to tradition, the instrument was invented in China during the 3rd to 5th centuries AD Jin dynasty. The ruan, another Chinese instrument, is the ancestor of the yueqin. The period overlaps with the period of immigration of ancient non-Han Chinese peoples and invasions, by groups such as the Five Barbarians.

The yueqin is a type of ruan, what may be China's oldest lute. Ruans may have a history of over 2,000 years, the earliest form may be the qin pipa (秦琵琶), which was then developed into ruanxian (named after Ruan Xian, 阮咸), shortened to ruan (阮).[1][2] In old Chinese texts from the Han to the Tang dynasty, the term pipa was used as a generic term for a number plucked chordophones, including ruan, therefore does not necessarily mean the same as the modern usage of pipa which refers only to the pear-shaped instrument. According to the Pipa Annals 《琵琶赋》 by Fu Xuan (傅玄) of the Western Jin dynasty, the pipa was designed after revision of other Chinese plucked string instruments of the day such as the Chinese zither, zheng (筝) and zhu (筑), or konghou (箜篌), the Chinese harp.[3] However, it is believed that ruan may have been descended from an instrument called xiantao (弦鼗) which was constructed by labourers on the Great Wall of China during the late Qin dynasty (hence the name Qin pipa) using strings stretched over a pellet drum.[4]

The antecedent of ruan in the Qin dynasty (221 BC – 206 BC), i.e. the Qin pipa, had a long, straight neck with a round sound box in contrast to the pear-shape of pipa of later dynasties. The name of "pipa" is associated with "tantiao" (彈挑), a right hand technique of playing a plucked string instrument. "Pi" (琵), which means "tan" (彈), is the downward movement of plucking the string. "Pa" (琶), which means "tiao" (挑), is the upward movement of plucking the string.[5]

The present name of the Qin pipa, which is "ruan", was not given until the Tang dynasty (8th century). During the reign of Empress Wu Zetian (武則天) (about 684–704 AD), a copper instrument that looked like the Qin pipa was discovered in an ancient tomb in Sichuan (四川). It had 13 frets and a round sound box. It was believed that it was the instrument which the Eastern Jin (東晉) musician Ruan Xian (阮咸) loved to play.

Although the ruan was never as popular as the pipa, the ruan was divided into several smaller, better-known instruments within recent centuries, such as yueqin ("moon" lute, 月琴) and qinqin (Qin [dynasty] lute, 秦琴) . The short-necked yueqin, with no sound holes, is now used primarily as accompaniment for Beijing opera. The long-necked qinqin is a member of both Cantonese (廣東) and Chaozhou (潮州) ensembles.

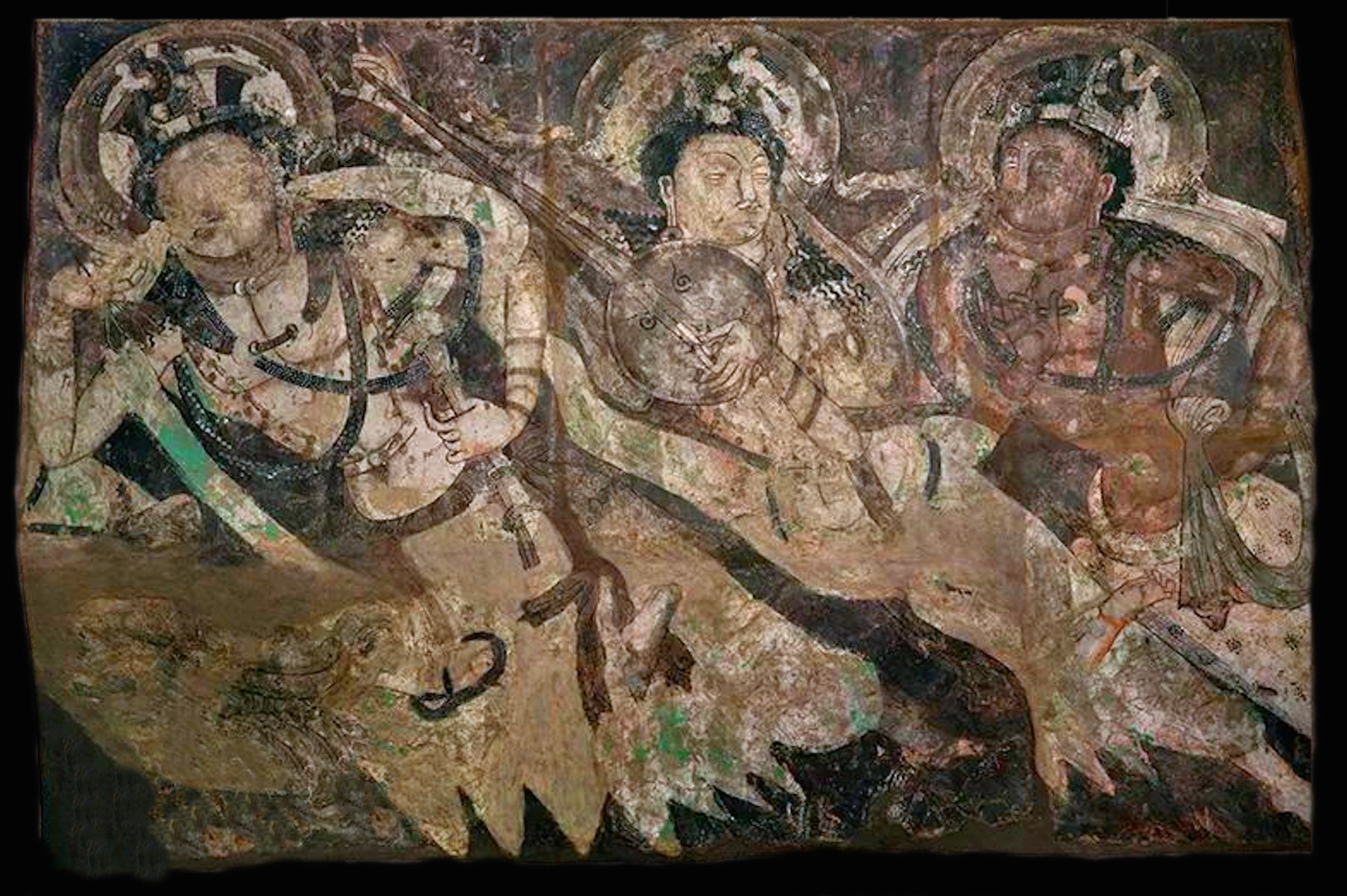
Kizil Cave 77, Cave of the Statues, back room, back wall, fresco over reclining Parinirvana Buddha.

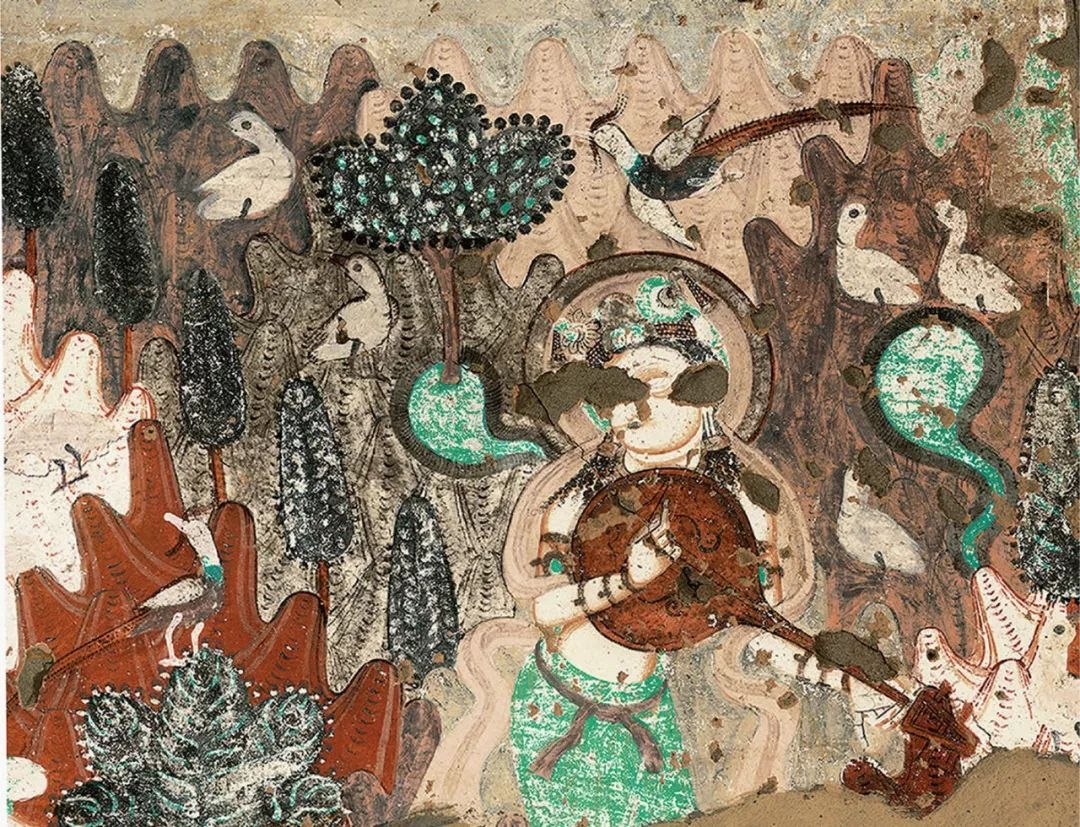
Kizil Cave 118, circa 395-465

=== Gallery: Asian plucked lutes, long and short-necked ===
Musical instruments came into China from Central Asia, such as the pipa, or may have been invented locally such as the Qin-Pipa or sanxian. China became a source of instruments for (or shares instruments in common with) other cultures, including Korea, Japan and Vietnam. Three ways to categorized these are:

- short-necked pipas (such as the pipa, liuqin, bipa, and Tỳ bà)
- short and long-necked moon lutes (such as the yueqin, ruan, gekkin, đàn tứ, đàn đáy, zhongruan, qinqin, đàn sến, đàn nguyệt)
- long-necked lutes (such as the sanxian, tianqin, shamisen, đàn tam, and đàn tính).

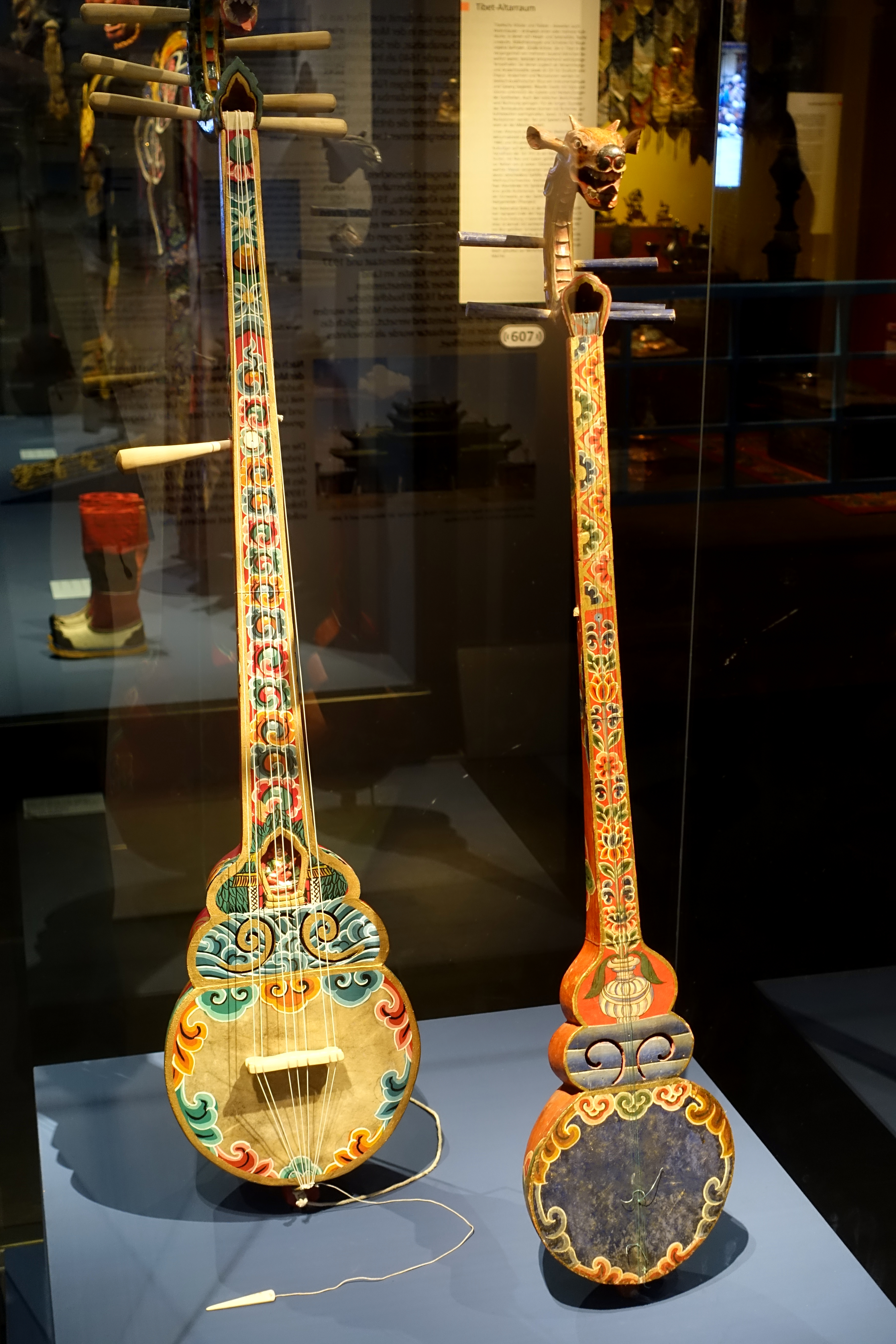
The Bhutanese Drangyen

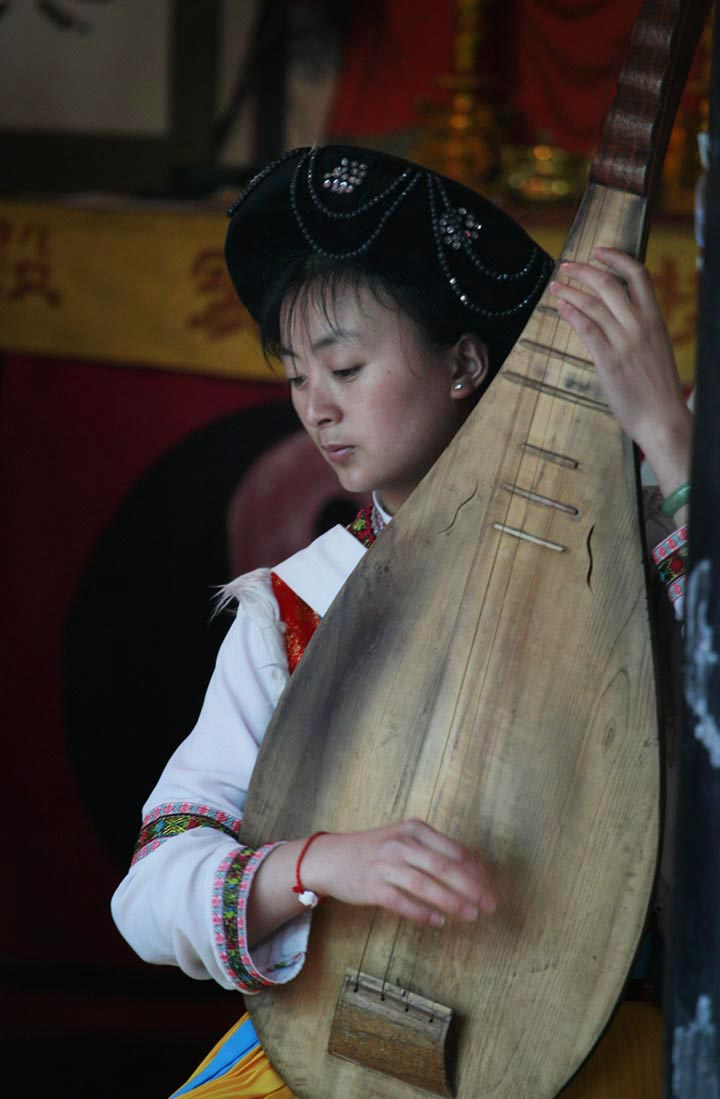
China, pipa, 2008.

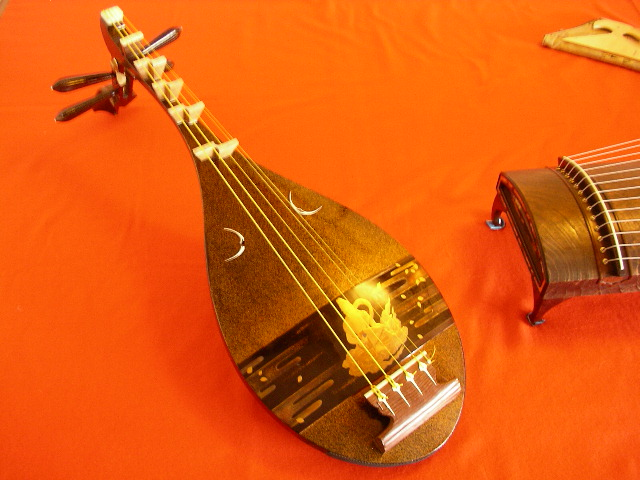
Japan, biwa

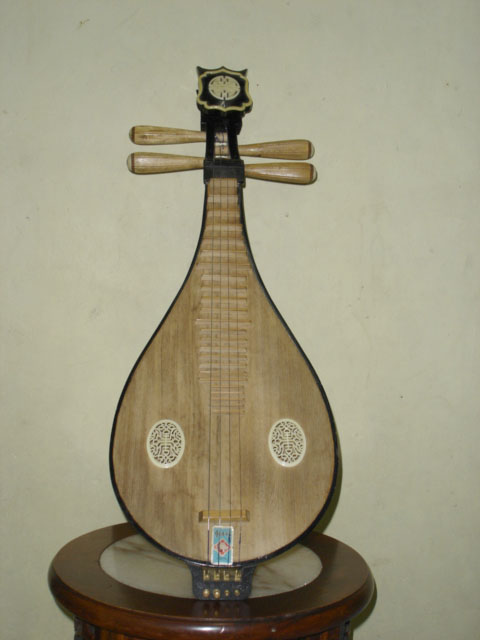
China, liuqin, smaller than pipa

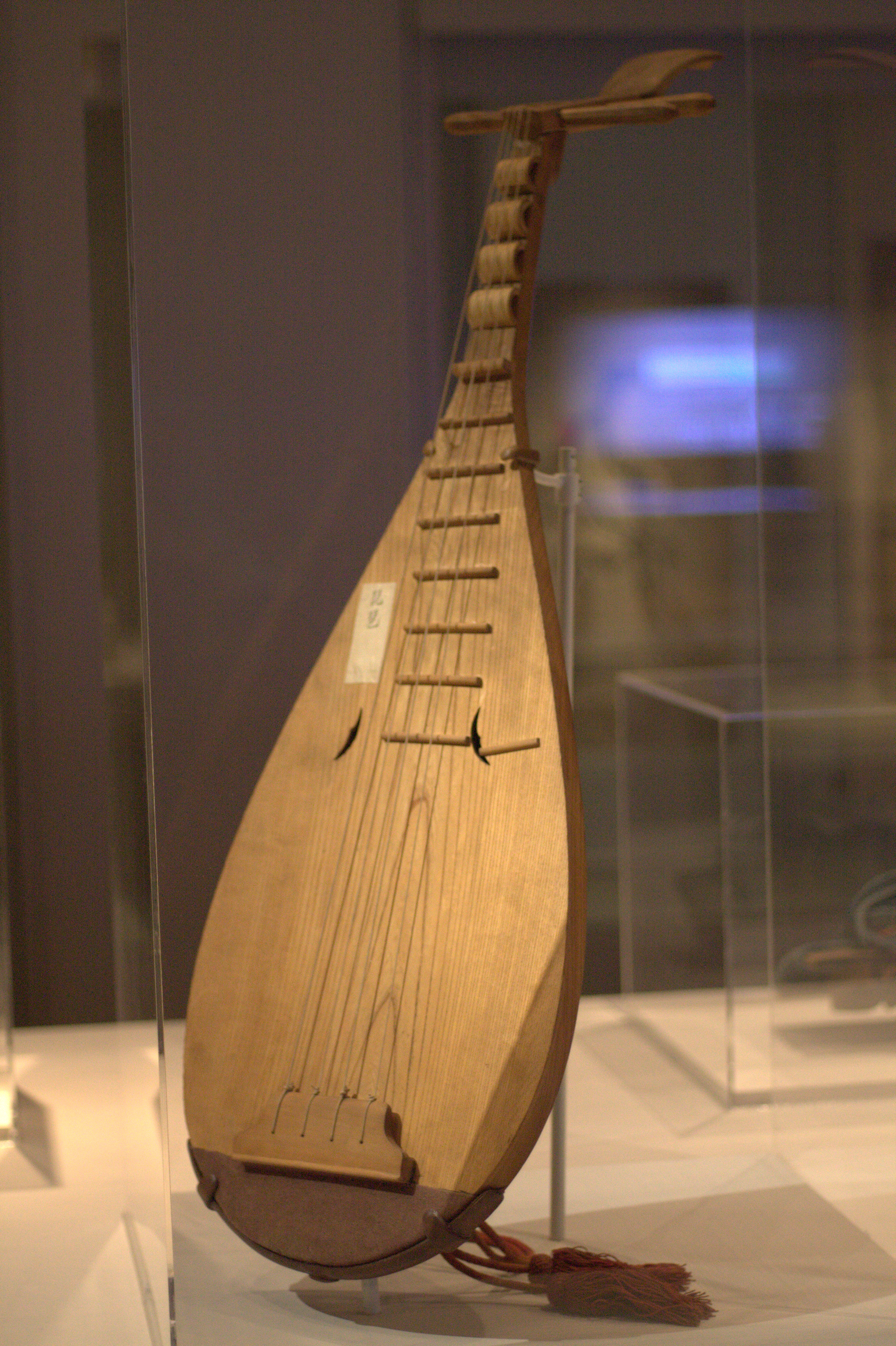
Korea, bipa

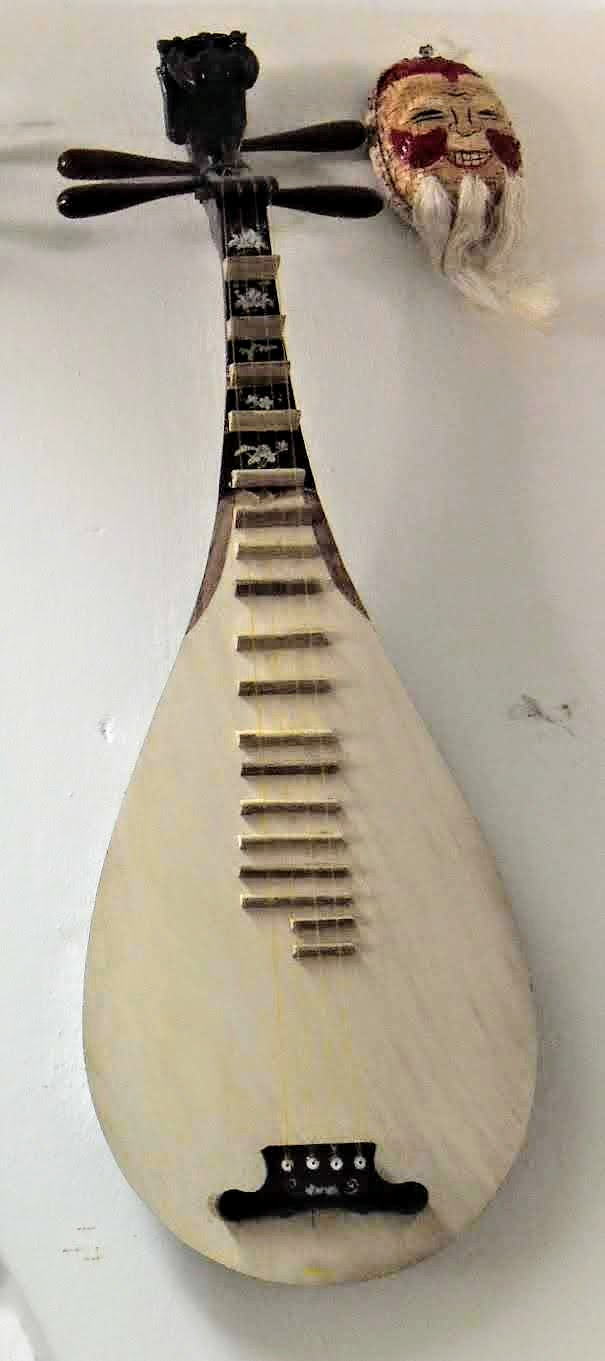
Vietnam, đàn tỳ bà

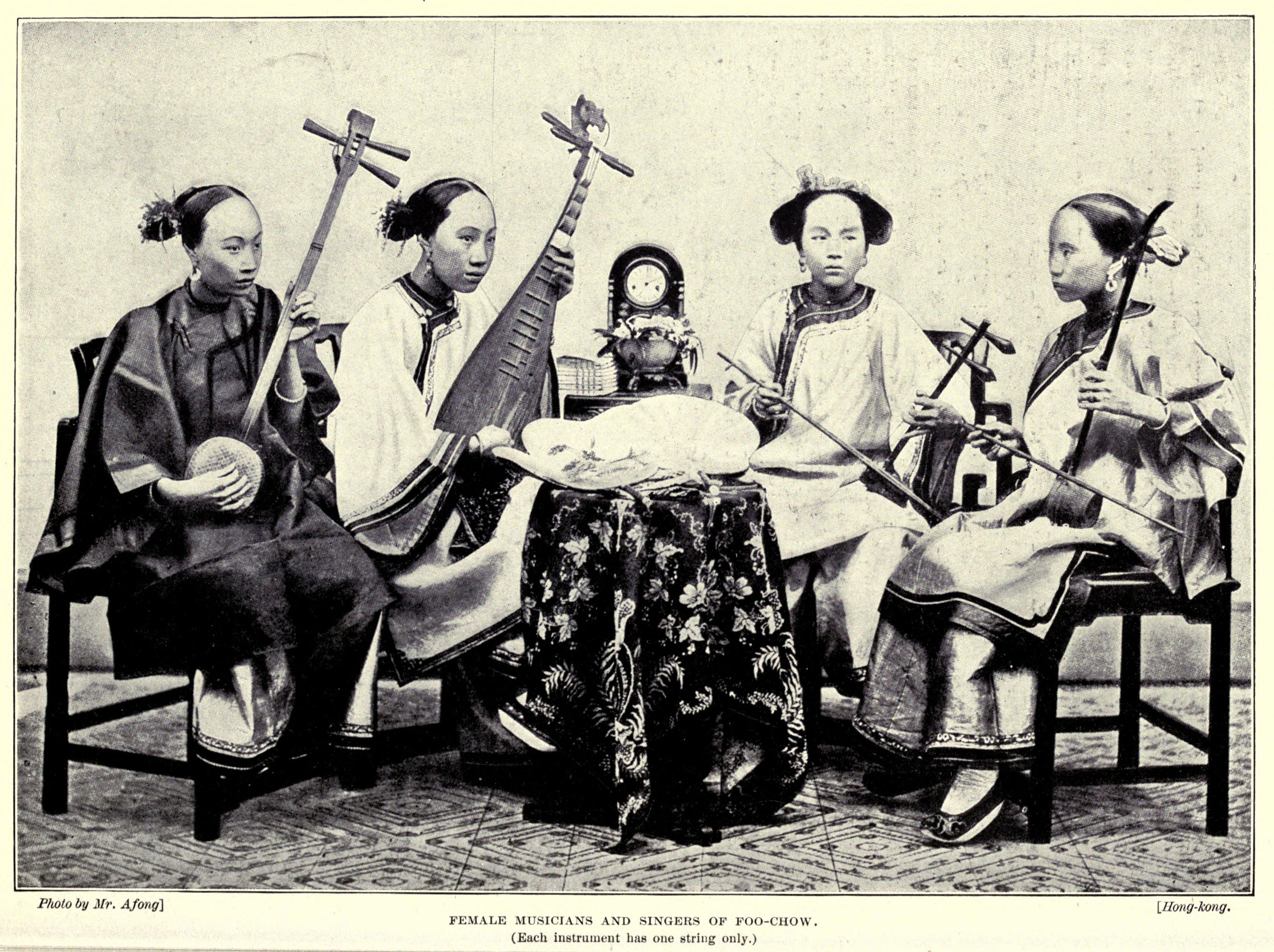
China, (left to right) sanxian, pipa, two huqin type fiddles, c. 1907, Fuzhou.

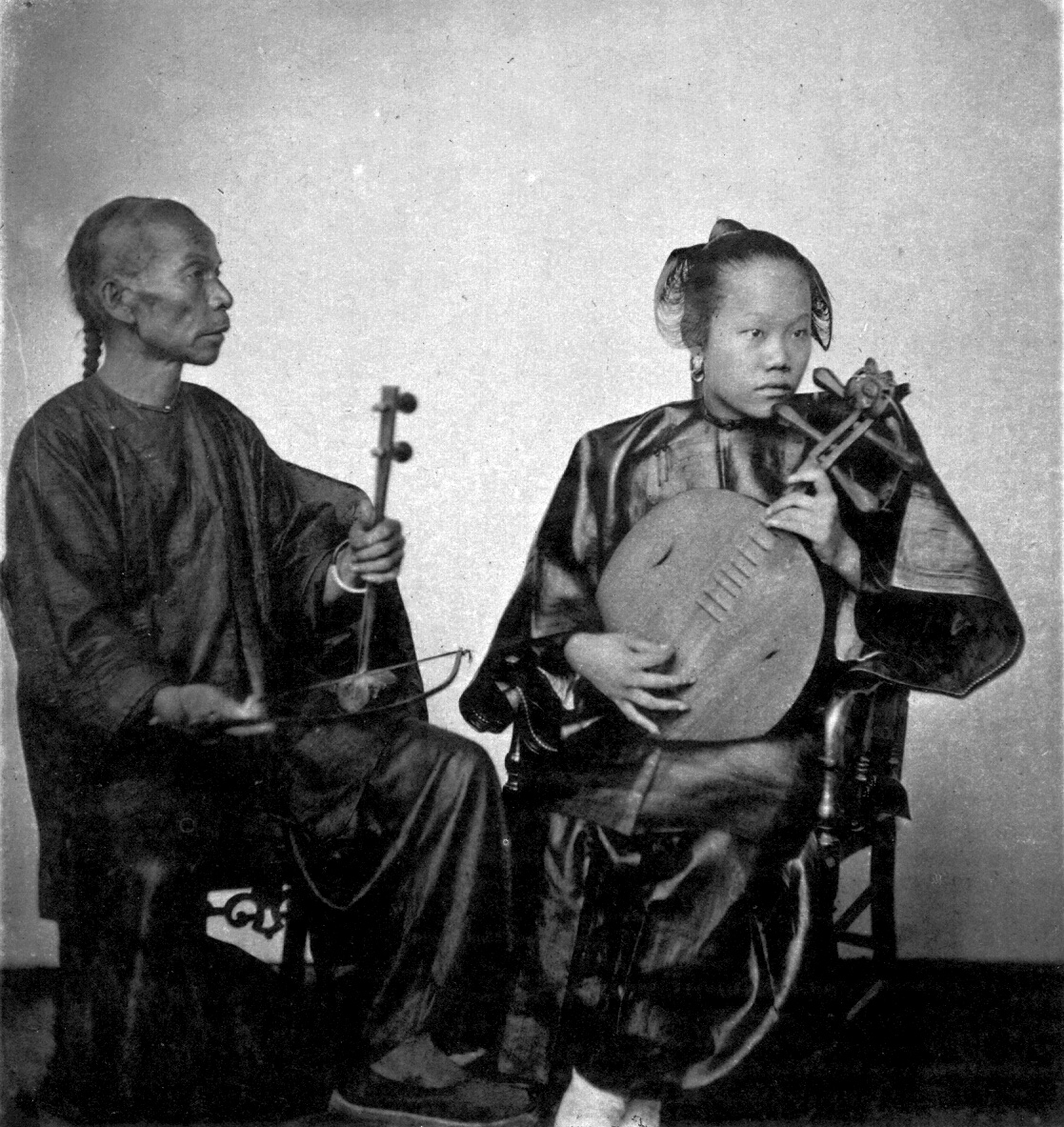
China, huqin type fiddle (left) and a yueqin (moon lute) or ruan, c. 1874.

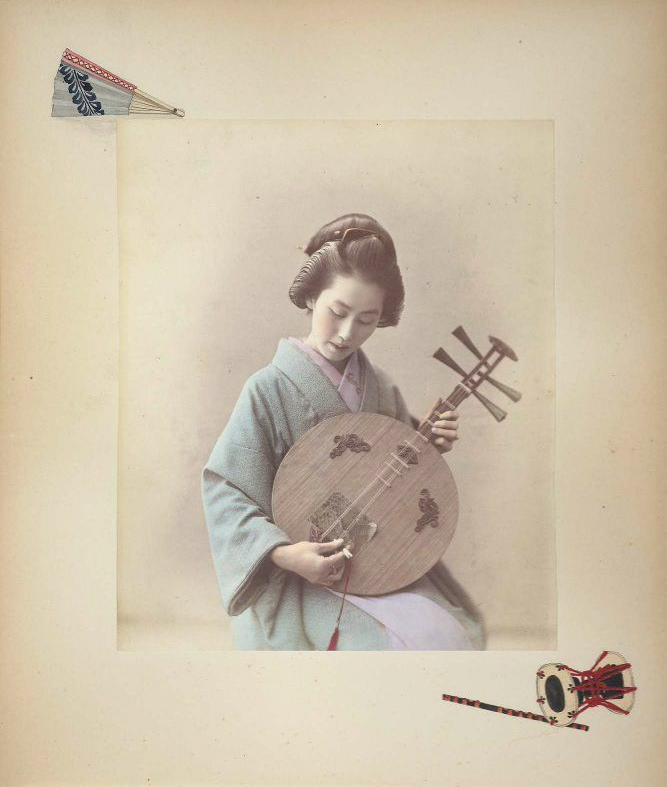
Japan, gekkin, 1886.

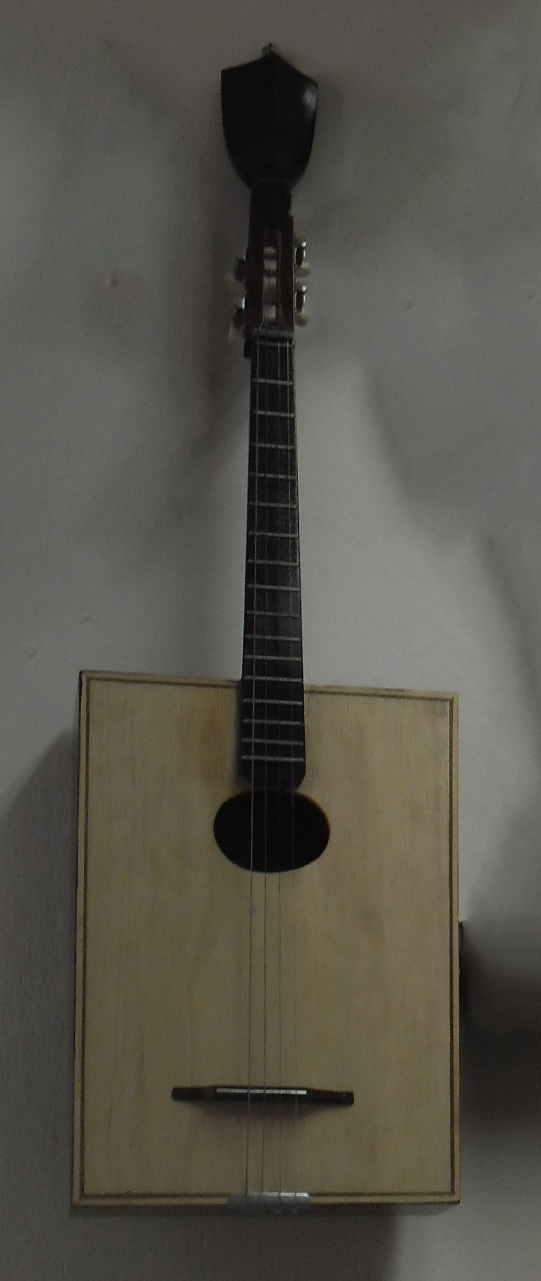
Vietnam, đàn tứ, tứ meaning "four" for 4 strings. Also called đàn đoản (đoản meaning "short", referring to the instrument's neck). Related to Chinese yueqin, although 4 individual strings makes it closer to the ruan.

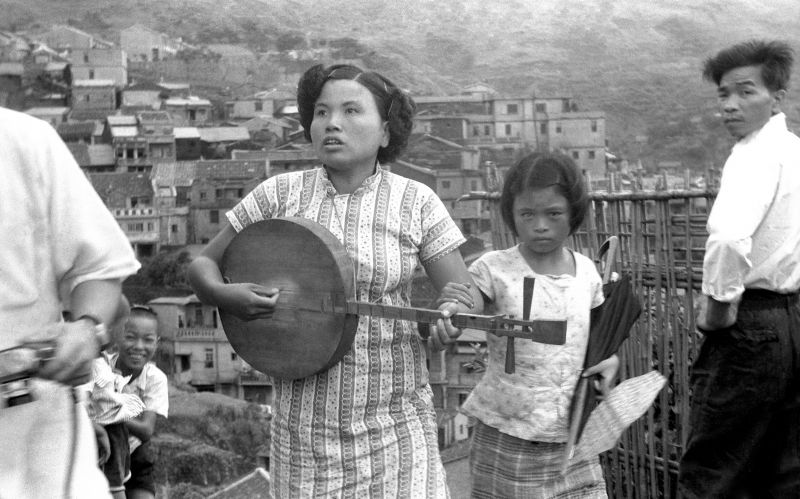
China, southern yueqin or possibly a zhongruan (中阮, lit. "medium ruan"), 1960. Southern yueqins had long necks, unlike the northern. This instrument lacks the large soundholes that are a trait of the ruan. These are being revived in Taiwan.

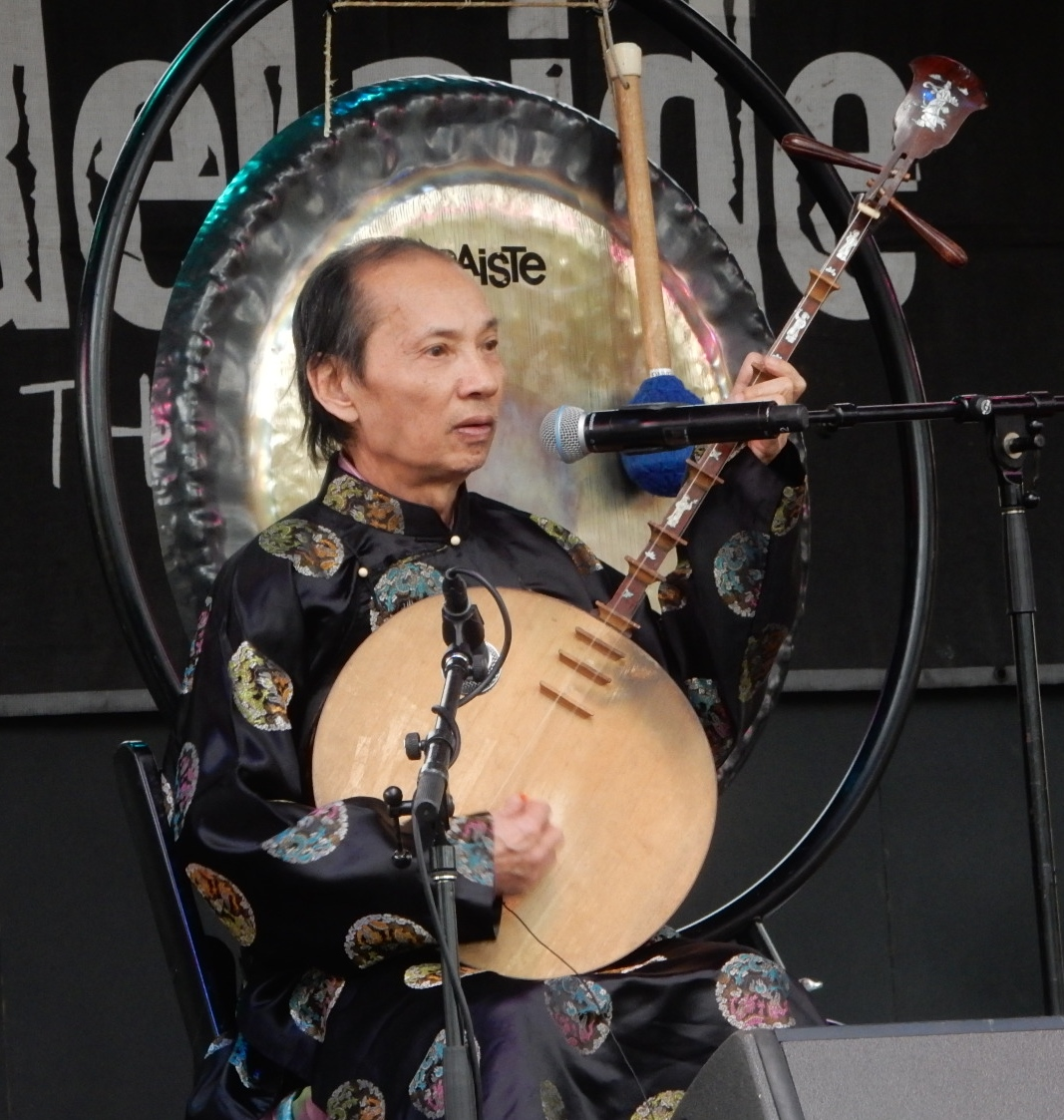
Vietnam, đàn nguyệt literally means "moon string-instrument" (đàn is the generic term for "string instrument" and nguyệt means "moon"). Image taken in Australia, 2017

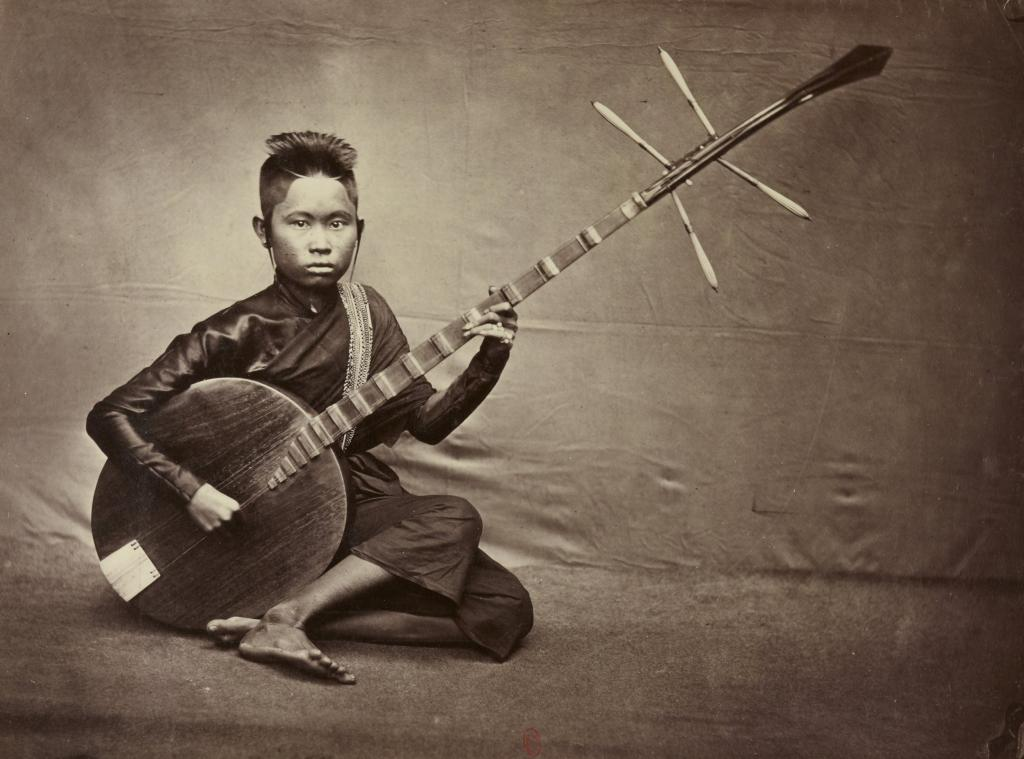
Cambodia, Chapei dong veng (ចាប៉ីដងវែង) and Thailand grajabpi (กระจับปี่), c. 1880. Origin uncertain: China (ruan or yueqin), Islamic (rubab or tanbir), India ("chapei derives from the Sanskrit kacchap(î)" turtle shell, used for sound bowl).

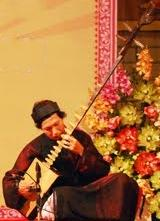
Vietnam đàn đáy. Possibly related to Chapei dong veng as both are heptatonic. Also shares characteristic with some Indonesian and Malaysian boat lutes: has an open back.

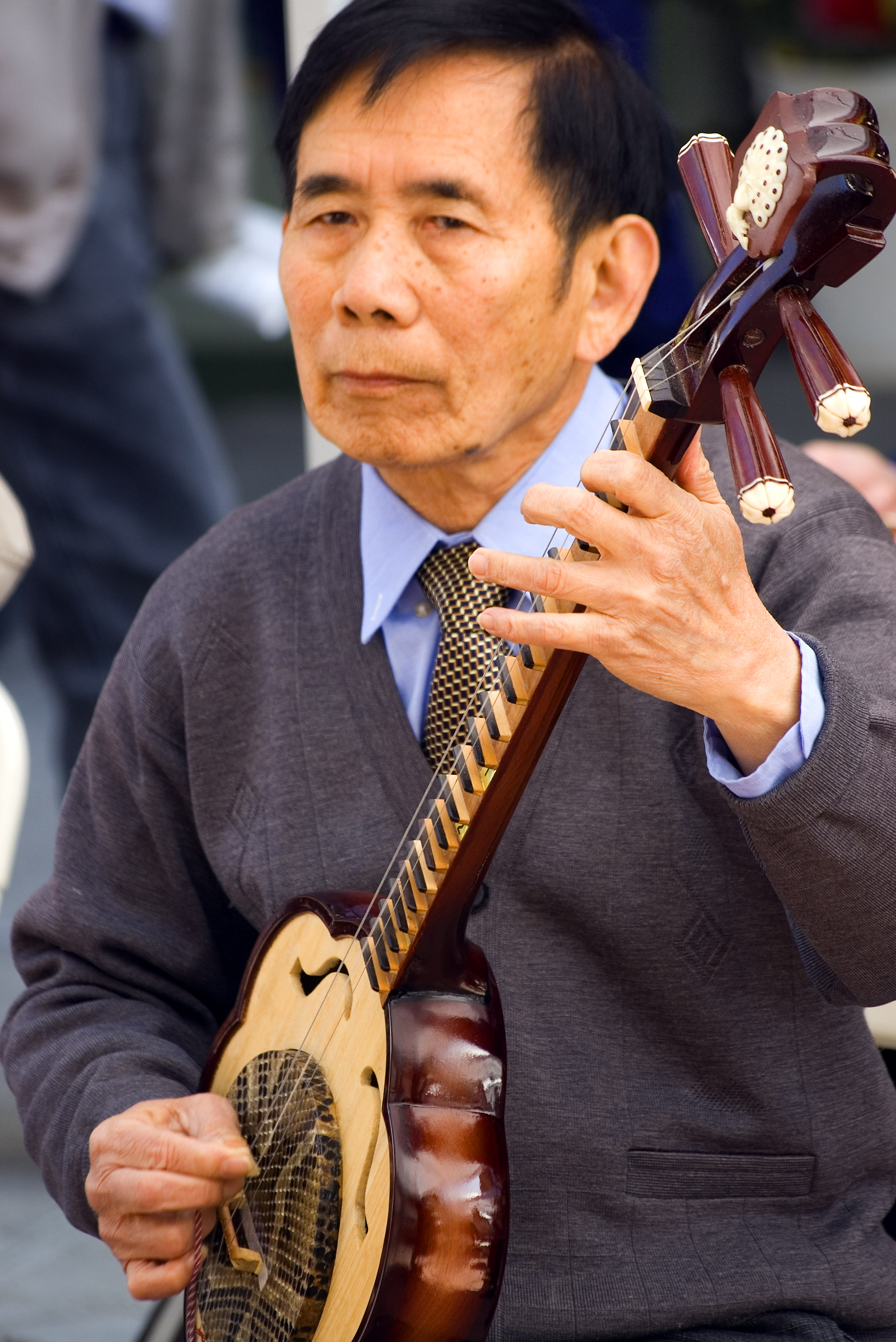
China, qinqin (秦琴) or plum blossom qin (梅花琴)

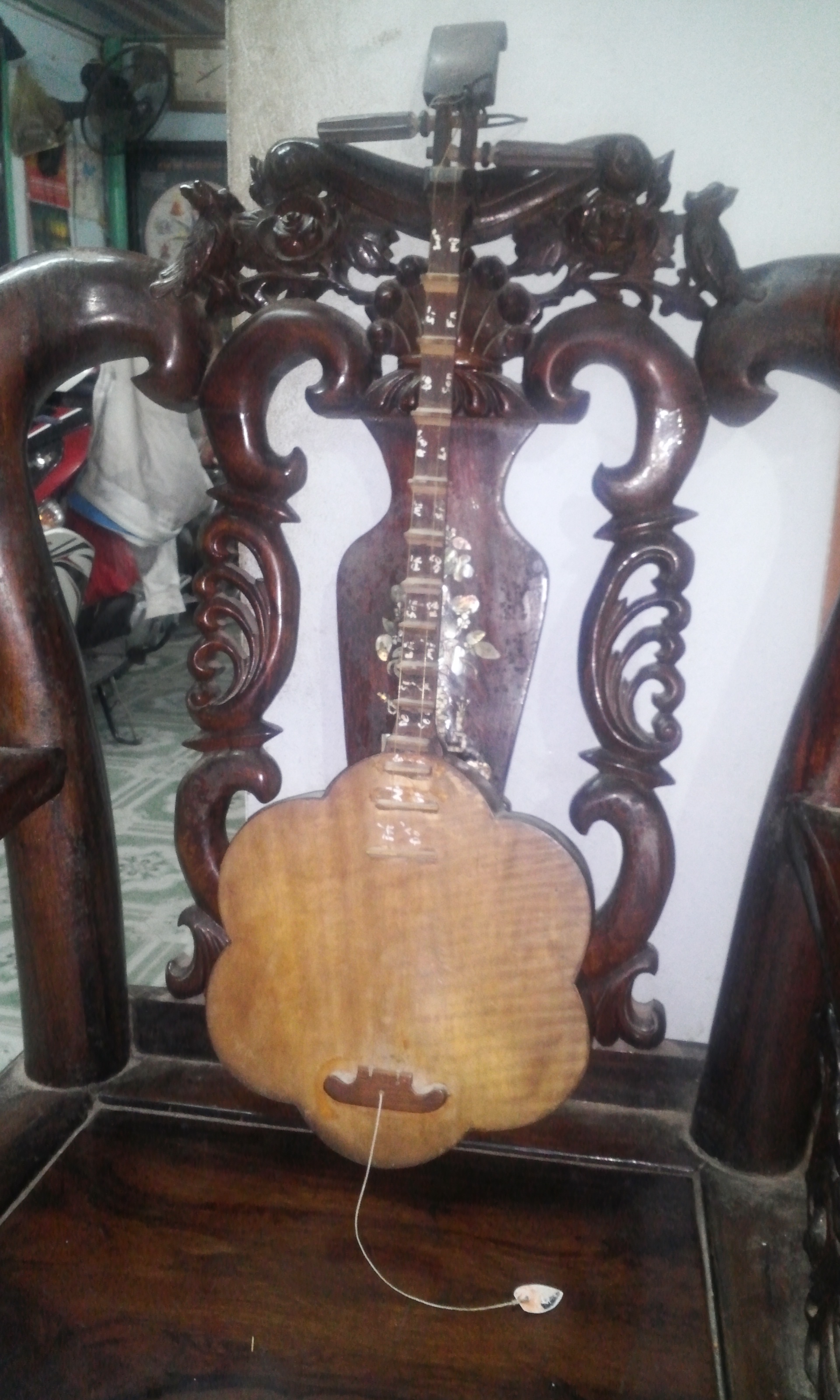
Vietnam, đàn sến. Vietnamese version of qinqin

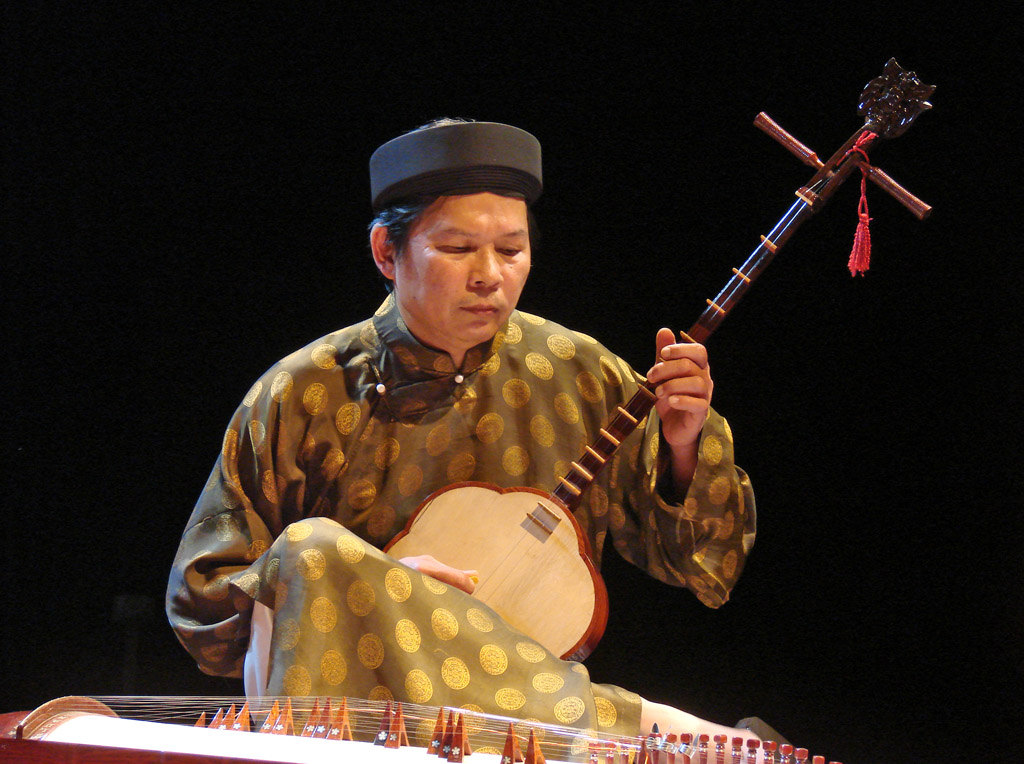
Vietnam đàn nguyệt or đàn sến

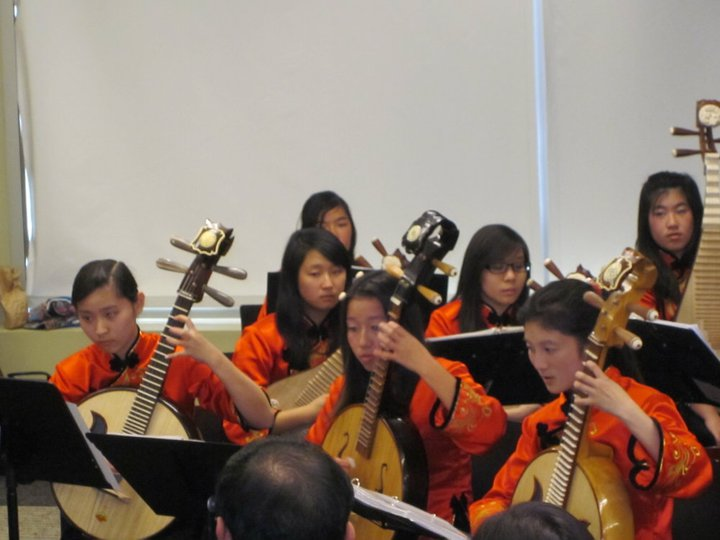
Larger ruans in an orchestra

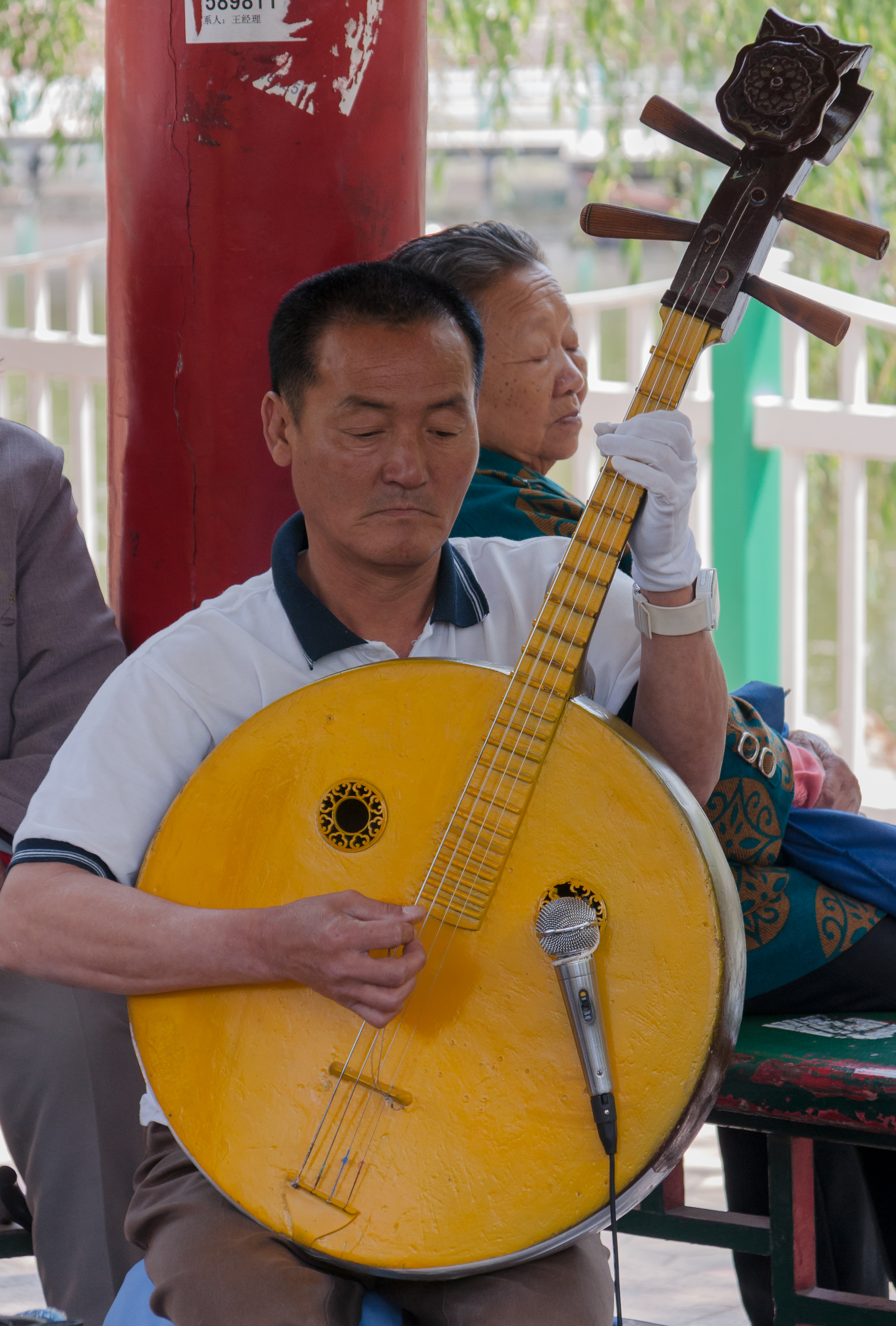
China, ruan-family instrument, either a bass daruan (大阮) or contrabass diyinruan (低音阮)

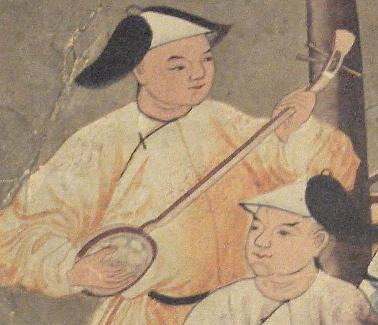
China, sanxian, 1780.

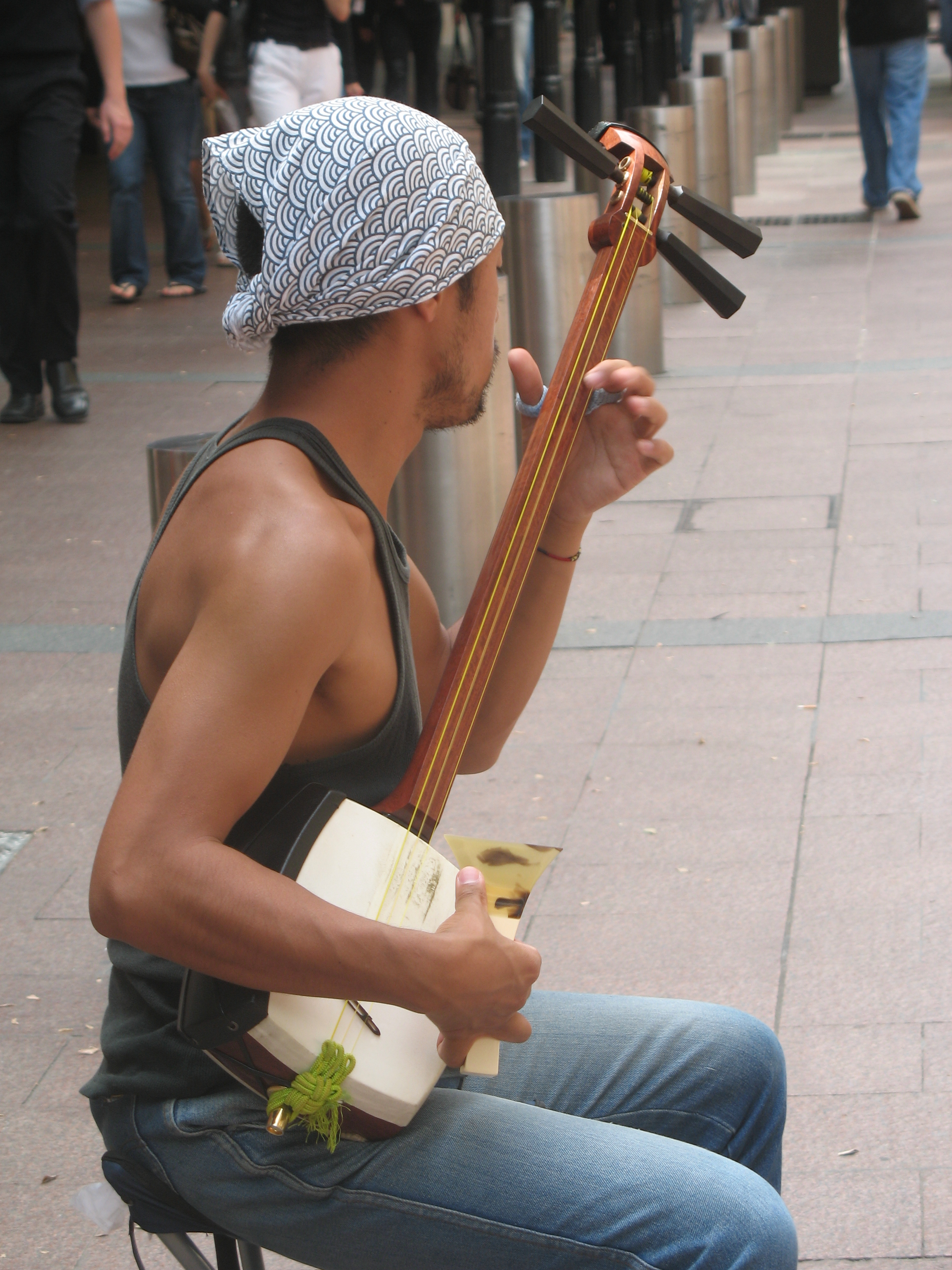
Japanese style shamisen, 2006 played by a man in Australia. Related to sanxian

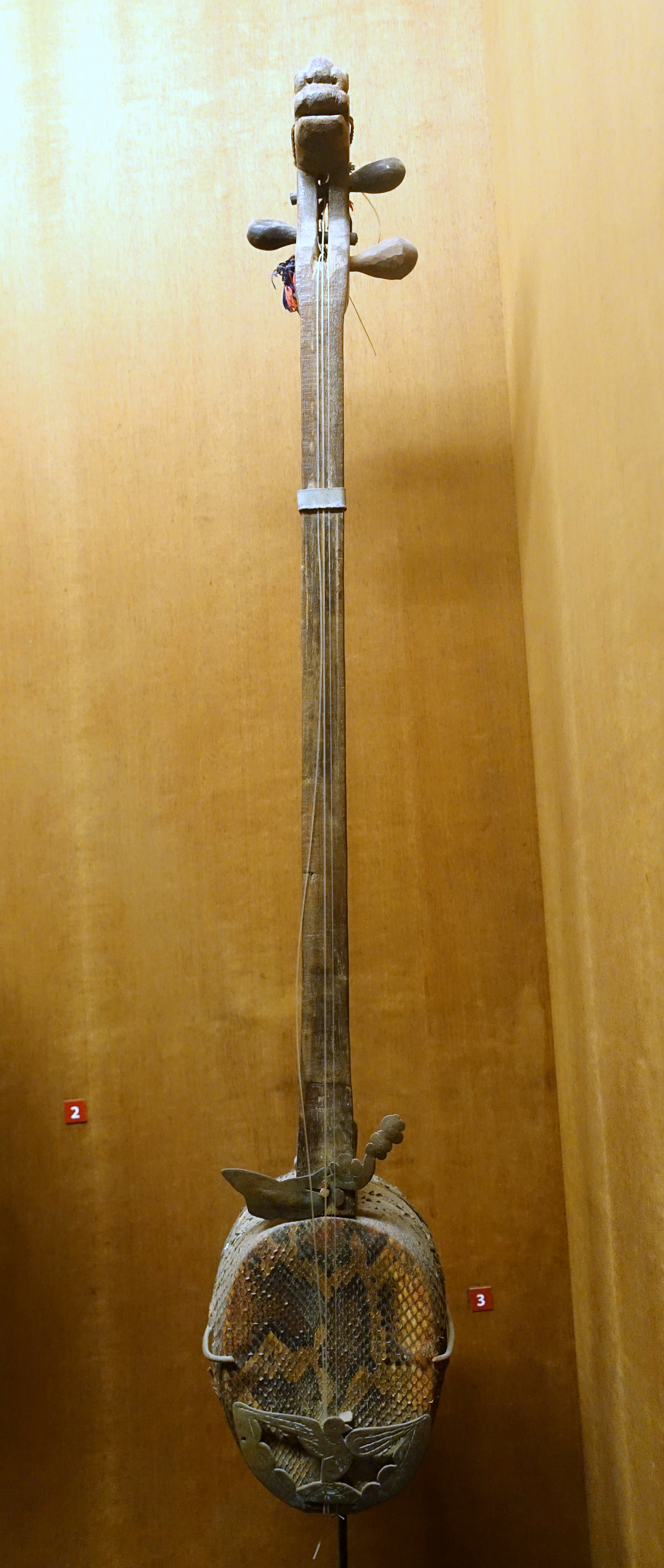
Đàn tam, tam means three (for three strings). Related to sanxian.

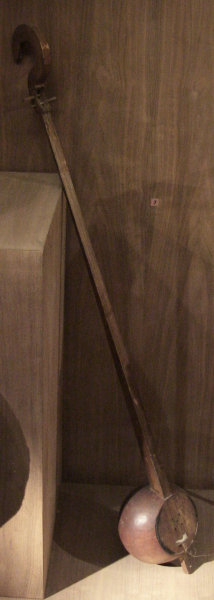
Vietnam, đàn tính, or tianqin (天琴). Gourd lute. A musical instrument of Zhuang people came to some ethnic groups in Northern mountainous region in Vietnam

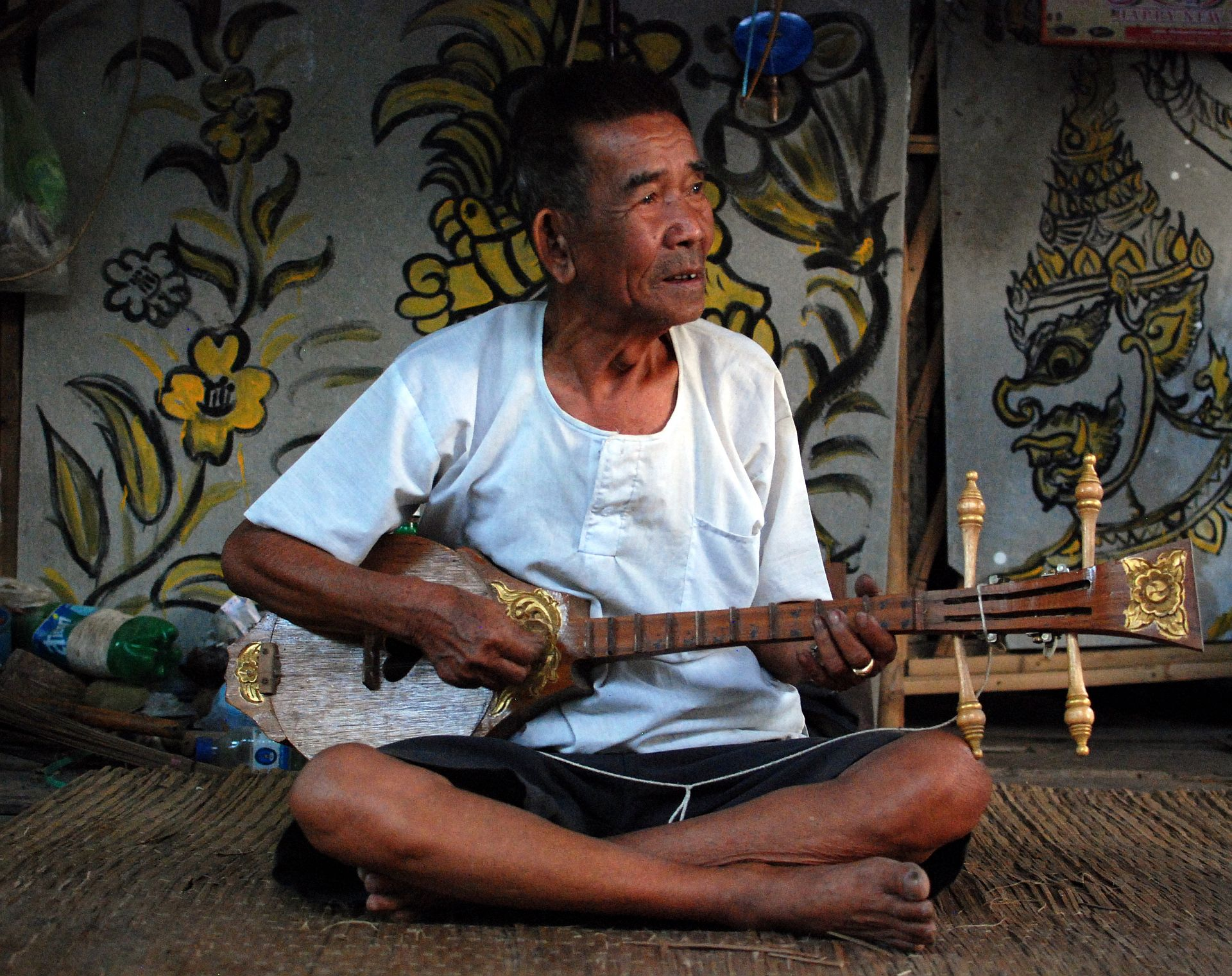
Thailand sueng

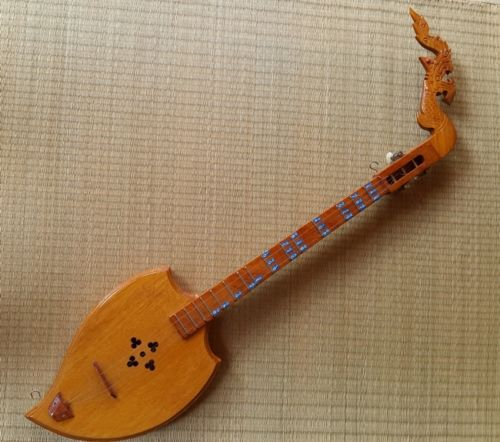
Thailand and Laos, phin

== Entering the Middle East, Northern Africa and Europe, the barbat and oud ==
8th–13th centuries AD

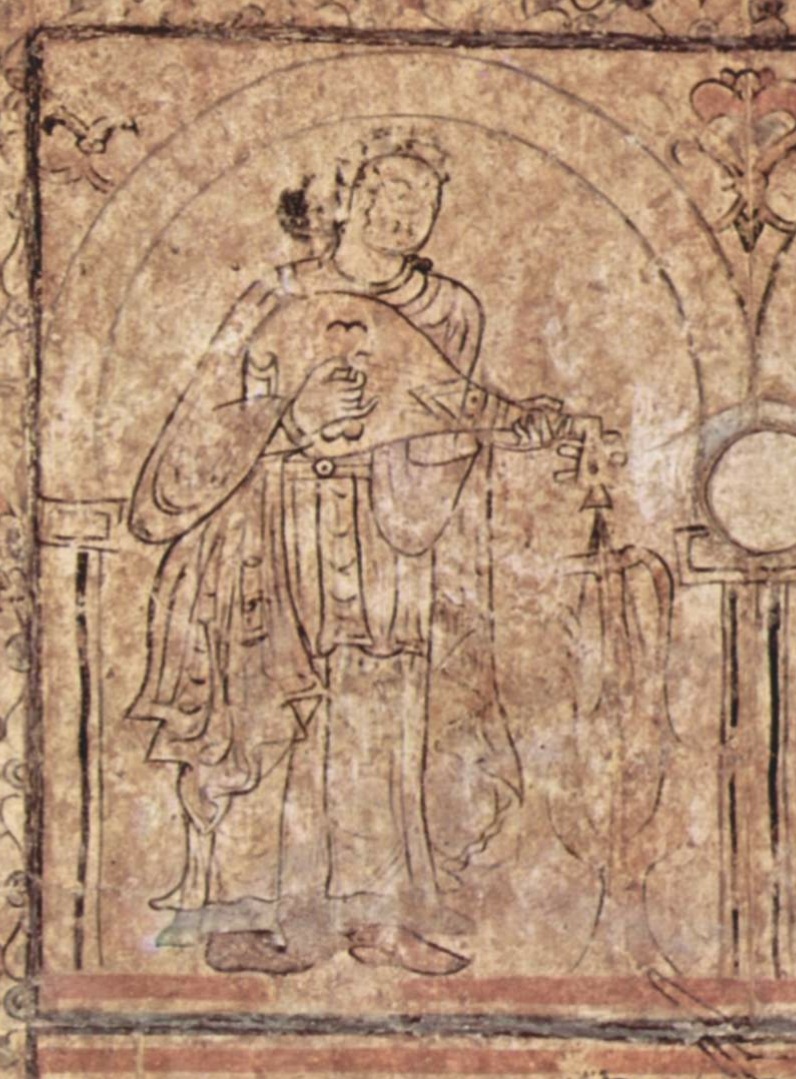
Syrian lute c. 730 AD

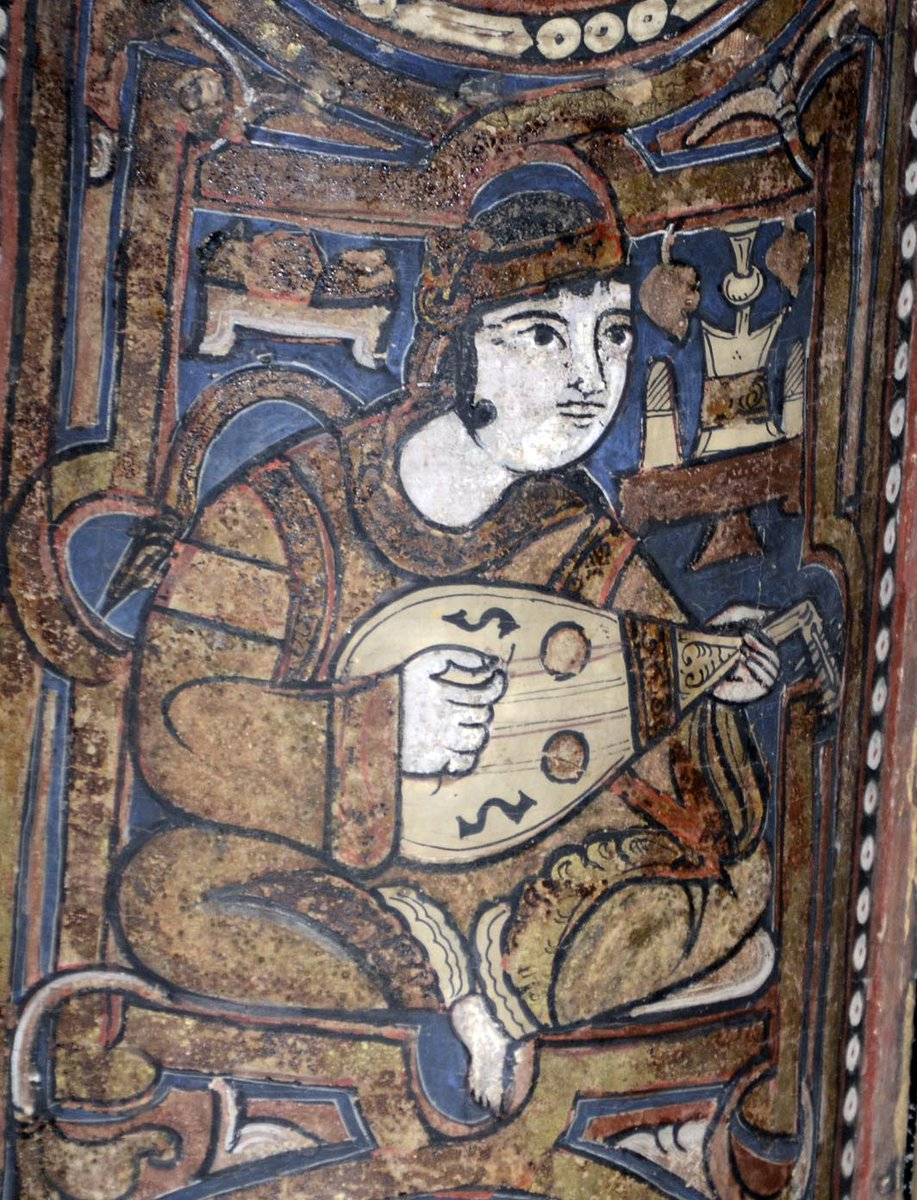
Sicily, c. 1140 AD

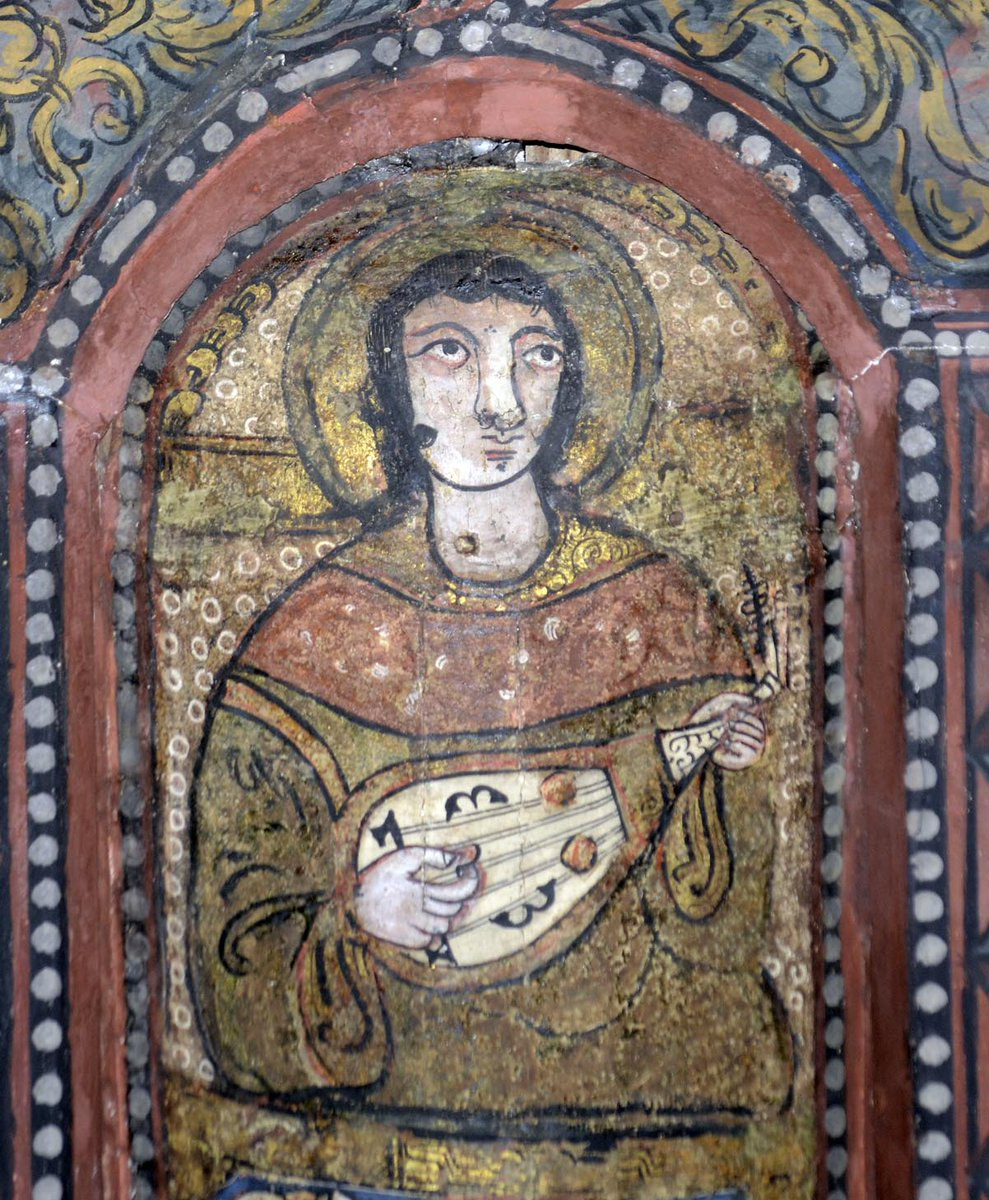
Sicily, c. 1140 AD

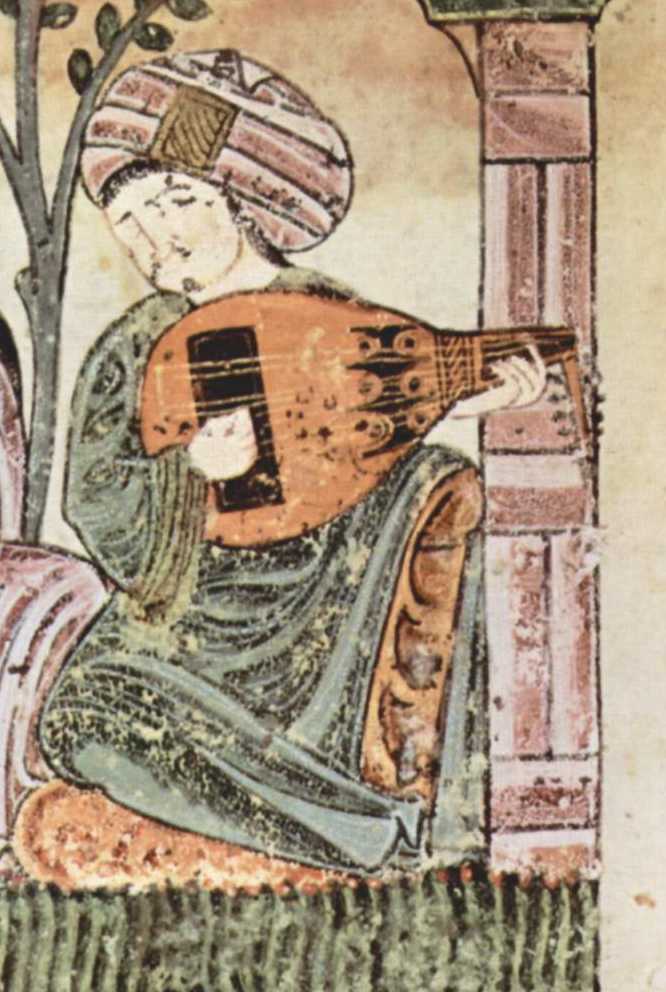
Lute from Al-Andalus copied manuscript, History of Bayâd and Riyâd. Copy from 13th century AD. Vatican Apostolic Library (MS Ar. 368)

(Left) oud found in Syria, has two features common to Tang dynasty pipa, the extra tip at the end of the peghead and the shape of the soundhole. (Center-two images) Oud-family instruments painted in the Cappella Palatina in Sicily, 12th century. Roger II of Sicily employed Muslim musicians in his court, and paintings show them playing a mixture of lute-like instruments, strung with 3, 4 and five courses of strings. (Right) 13th-century AD image of an oud, from a 13th-century copy of Bayâd and Riyâd, a larger instrument than those in images at the Cappella Palatina.

Bactria and Gandhara became part of the Sasanian Empire (224–651), the last empire of the Persians. Under the Sasanians, a short almond shaped lute from Bactria came to be called the barbat or barbud, which was developed into the later Islamic world's oud or ud. The lute was brought from Al-Hira in Persia to Mecca by Nadr ibn al-Harith, probably prior to 602 AD and was adopted by the Quraish, a mercantile Arab tribe. He taught the instrument and the song (ghina, Arabic: غِنَاء) that accompanied it to his people, where the instrument and song "were adopted by singing girls". Early musicians to use the lute include the Persian Sa'ib Khathir (died 683 AD), who brought the lute to Medina and Ibn Suraij in Mecca, said to have been the first to sing Arab songs on a lute "built in the Persian style" in 684 AD.

When the Umayyads conquered Hispania in 711 and created Andalusia, they brought their ud or quitra along, into a country that had already known a lute tradition under the Romans, the pandura.

During the 8th and 9th centuries, many musicians and artists from across the Islamic world flocked to Iberia. Among them was Abu l-Hasan 'Ali Ibn Nafi' (789–857), a prominent musician who had trained under Ishaq al-Mawsili (d. 850) in Baghdad and was exiled to Andalusia before 833 AD. He taught and has been credited with adding a fifth string to his oud and with establishing one of the first schools of music in Córdoba.

By the 11th century, Muslim sections of Spain, or Al-Andalus, had become a center for the manufacture of instruments. These goods spread gradually to Provence, influencing French troubadours and trouvères and eventually reaching the rest of Europe. While Europe developed the lute, the oud remained a central part of Arab music, and broader Ottoman music as well, undergoing a range of transformations.

Beside the introduction of the lute to Spain by the Moors, another important point of transfer of the lute from Arabian to European culture was Sicily, where it was brought either by Byzantine or later by Muslim musicians. There were singer-lutenists at the court in Palermo following the Norman conquest of the island from the Muslims, and the lute is depicted extensively in the ceiling paintings in the Palermo's royal Cappella Palatina, dedicated by the Norman King Roger II of Sicily in 1140. Sicilian influence increased as Tuscan poets visited Sicily in the 13th century to partake of the local culture. His Hohenstaufen grandson Frederick II, Holy Roman Emperor (1194–1250) continued integrating Muslims into his court, including Moorish musicians. By the 14th century, lutes had disseminated throughout Italy and, probably because of the cultural influence of the Hohenstaufen kings and emperor, based in Palermo, the lute had also made significant inroads into the German-speaking lands.

Although the major entry of the short lute was in western Europe, leading to a variety of lute styles, the short lute entered Europe in the East as well; as early as the 6th century, the Bulgars brought the short-necked variety of the instrument called Komuz to the Balkans.

Additionally, the Byzantine Empire bordered on both Europe and Persia. The Central Asian lute, now middle Eastern, can be seen in Byzantine artwork from the 9th and 10th centuries.

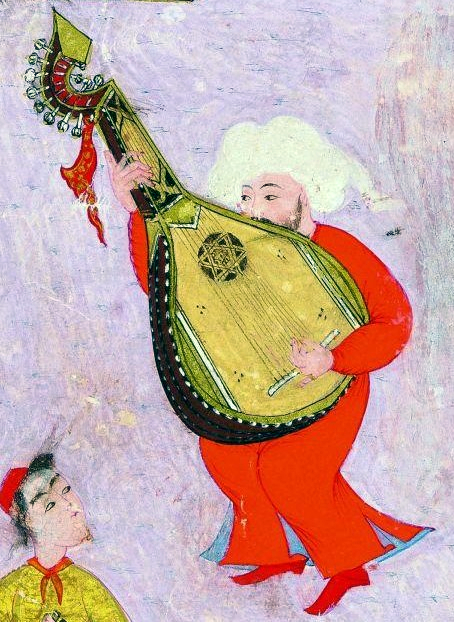
Ottoman Empire,1582. Shahrud, illustrated in the Surname-i Hümayun

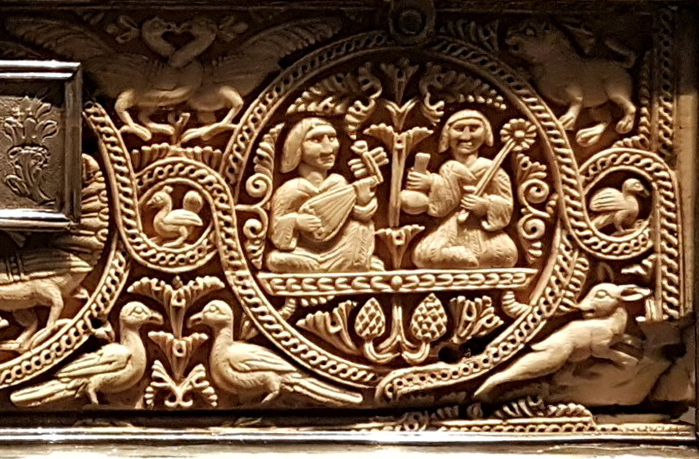
Oud, Spain, circa 1000-1025, Al-Andalus

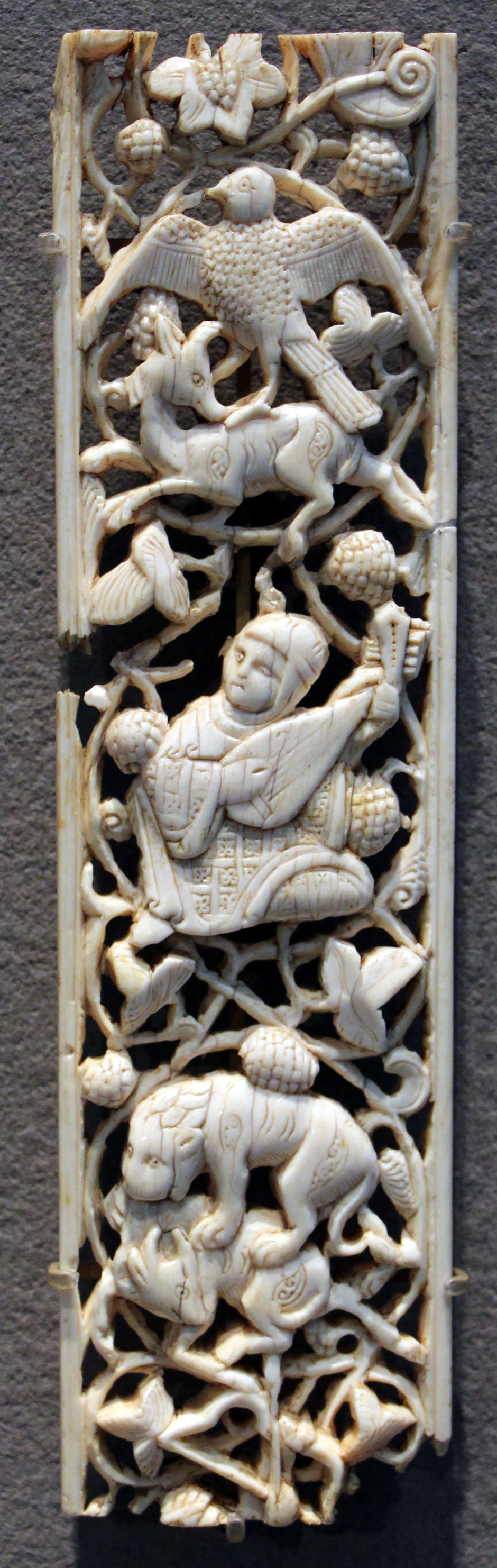
Oud, 11th century, Egypt.

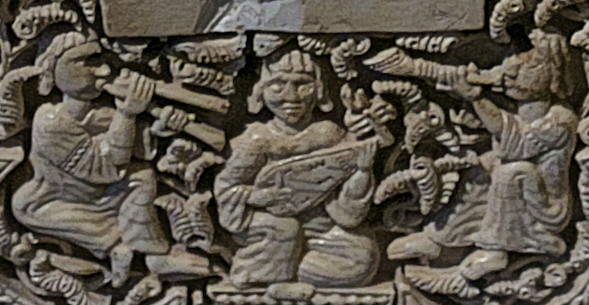
Circa 1004-1005 A.D., Caliphate of Cordoba. Oud player and two other musicians carved into the Arqueta de Leyre (Museo de Navarra)

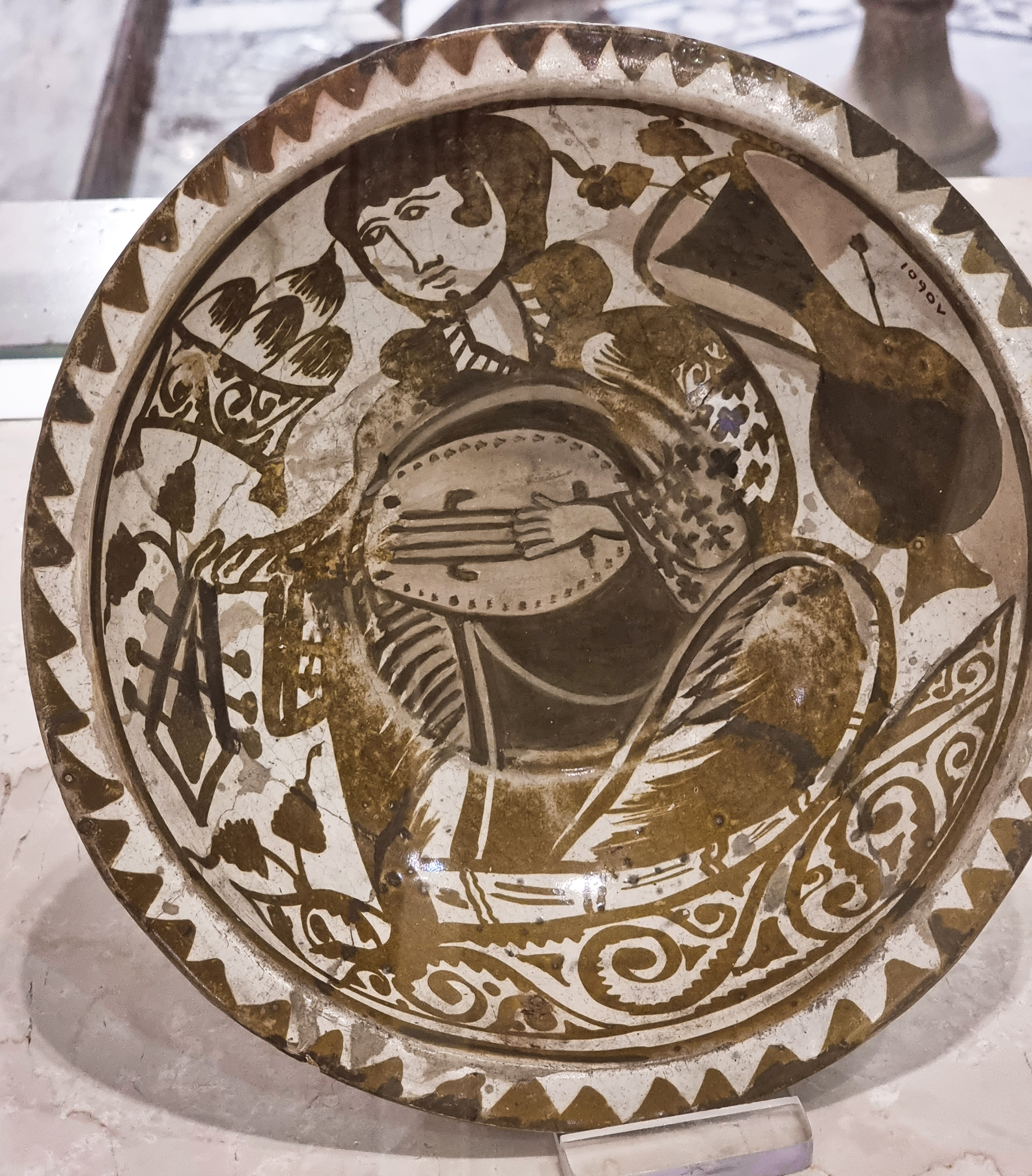
11th century, Cairo. Woman playing the oud. Fatimid dynasty.

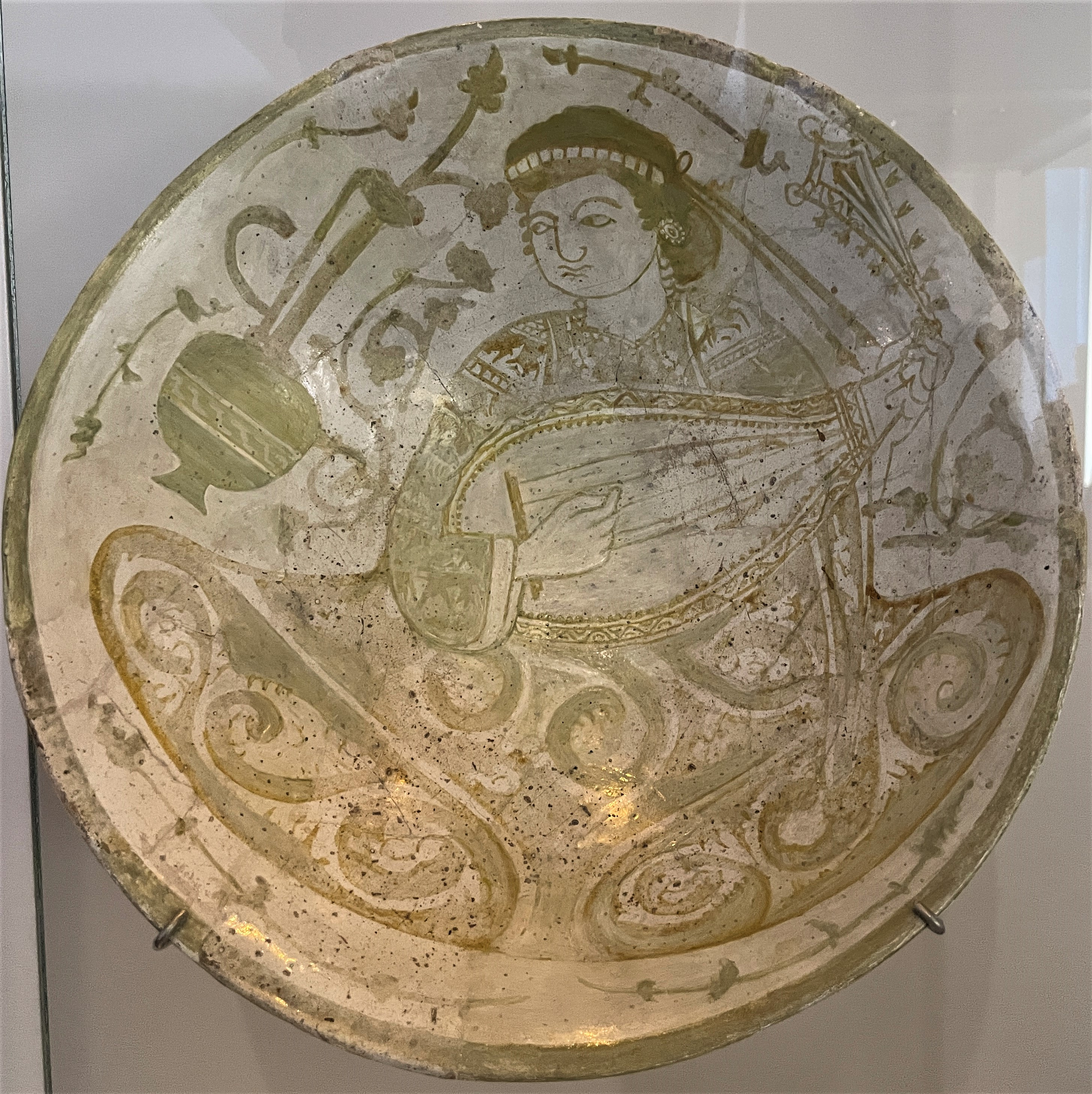
986-1015 A.D., Egypt. Woman playing the oud. Fatima's dynasty, 11th century. State Museums of Berlin, Museum of Islamic Art.

=== Muslim and European instruments, blended tradition ===
==== Fusion, instruments and music ====
Instruments from approximately the 12th and 13th centuries in Spain and Sicily, areas conquered by Muslims and then European Christians. Instrument identities are educated guesses, even by experts, as none of these were labeled and historical descriptions of different types are vague. Places where cultures interact are fertile sources of new ideas, where experimentation creates new instruments, the same process that blends different types of music to create new music by fusion. A similar process happened in Central Asia, over centuries of repeated trade by different cultures and conquests by different tribes.

Even after the Muslims were conquered in Spain or driven out, the process of experimentation continued, leading to a number of European instruments, including the guitar. A similar process occurred in Italy. Both Spain and Italy experimented with the viol or vihuela which led to bowed viols, violas, vielles, and guitars. Other experiments led to the citole and cittern or Portuguese guitar, the gittern and vandola (mandore, mandola) which also led to the guitar, but also to the mandolin family. Spanish instruments that survived in Spanish colonies include the tiple.

Portuguese experiments led to the Portuguese guitar, and other instruments seen today in places that Portuguese ships landed, including the cavaquinho and ukulele.

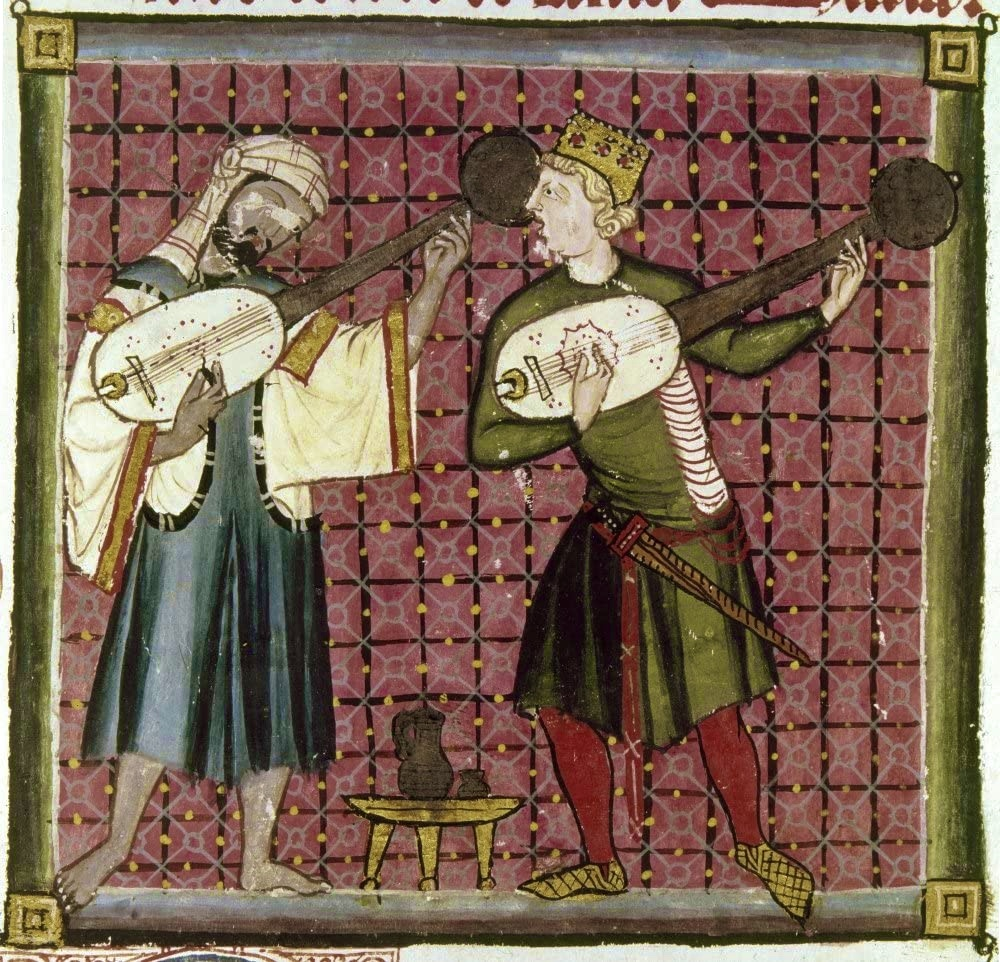
Al Andalus, Cantigas de Santa Maria, Musicians playing lute-family instruments. These have been called guitarra latina, guitarra morisca and tambura

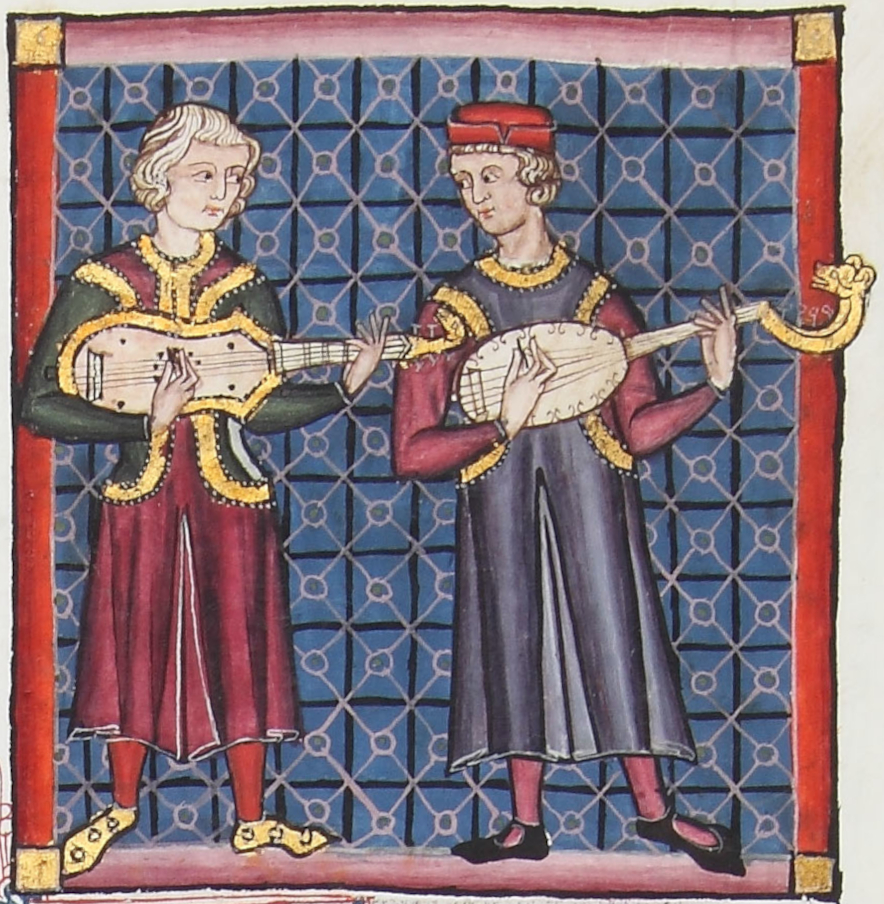
Al Andalus, Cantigas de Santa Maria, European musicians playing lute family instruments, possibly (left) citoles or guitarra latina and (right) guitarra morisca

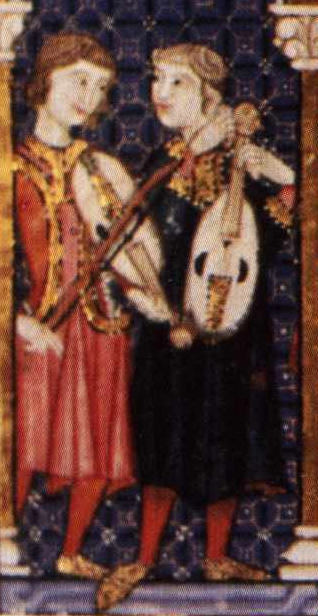
Al Andalus, Cantigas de Santa Maria, European musicians playing viola de arco

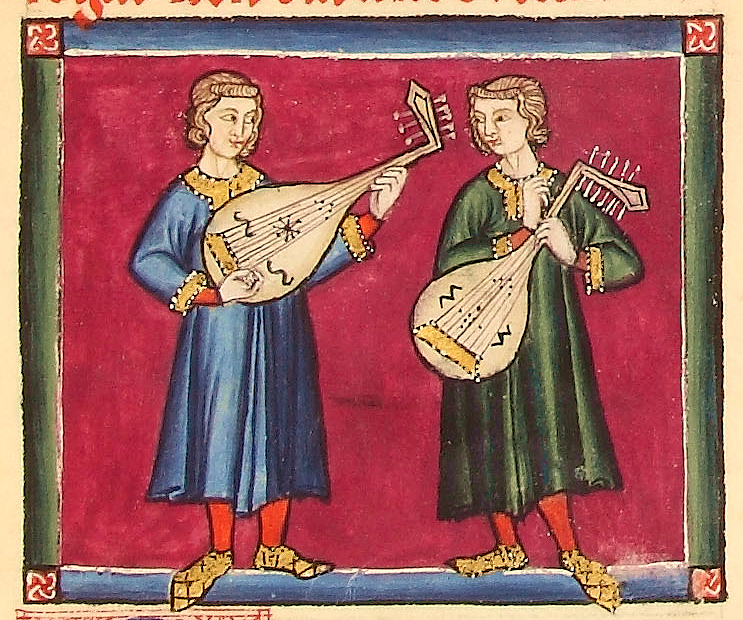
Al Andalus, Cantigas de Santa Maria, Europeans holding lutes with W sound holes (a Muslim instrument feature) and the drilled dots (found on the Gambus and on Eastern European lutes into the early 20th century AD.

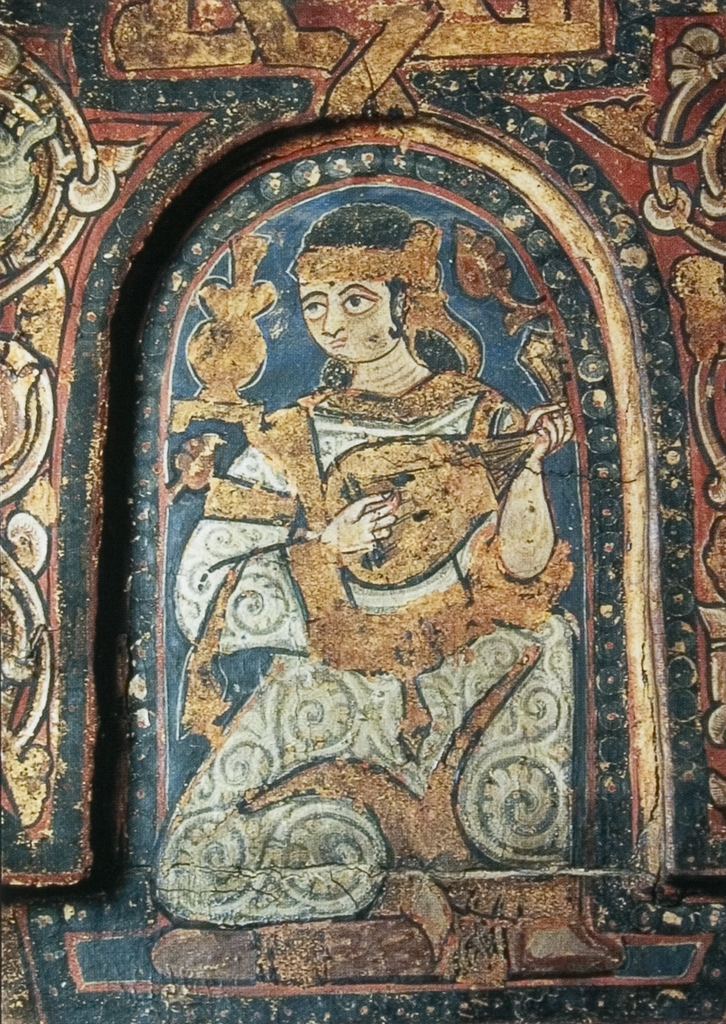
Palermo, Sicily, c. 1140 AD, oud from the Capella Palatina.

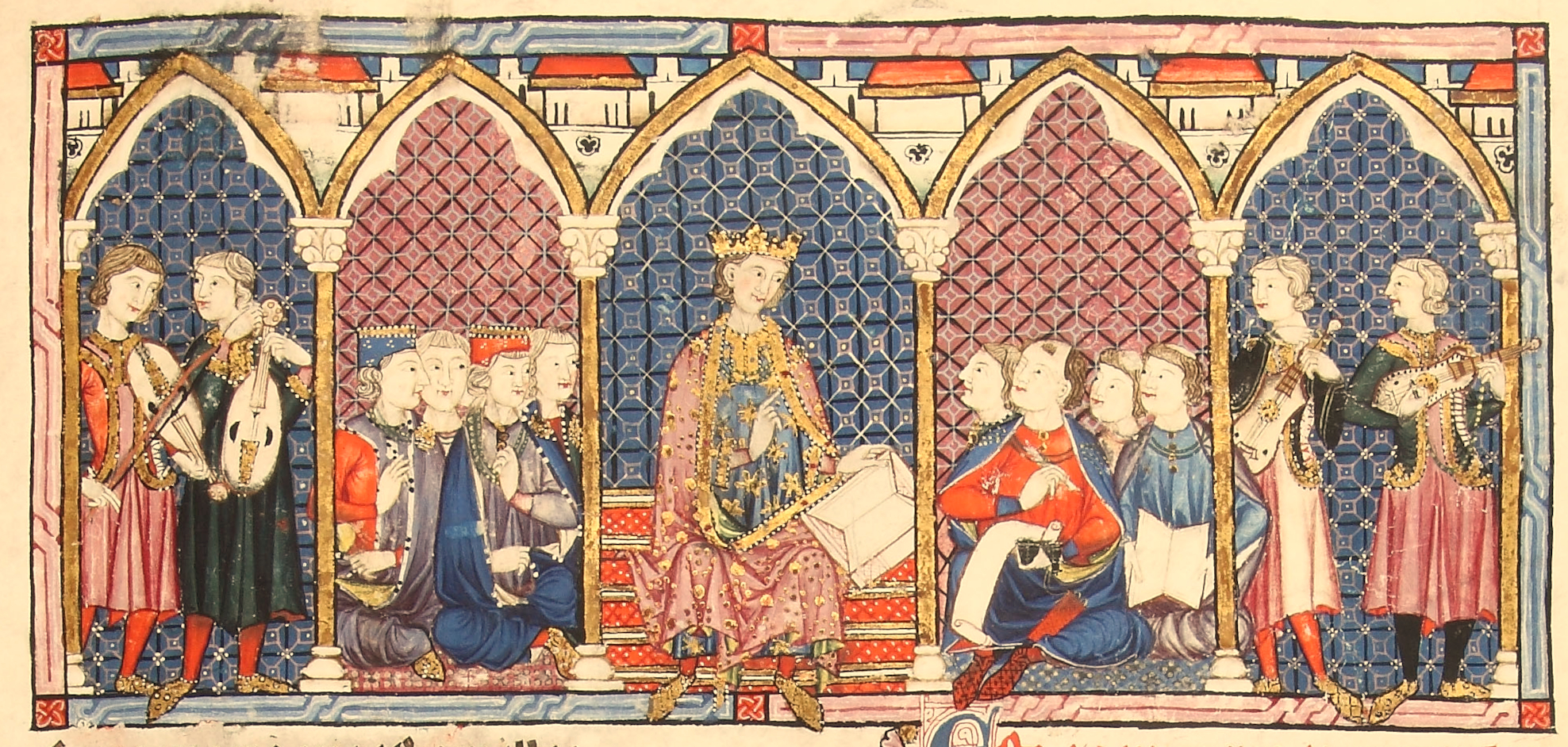
Al Andalus, Cantigas de Santa Maria, European musicians playing (left) viola de arco and (right) citoles or plucked fiddles or guitarra latina

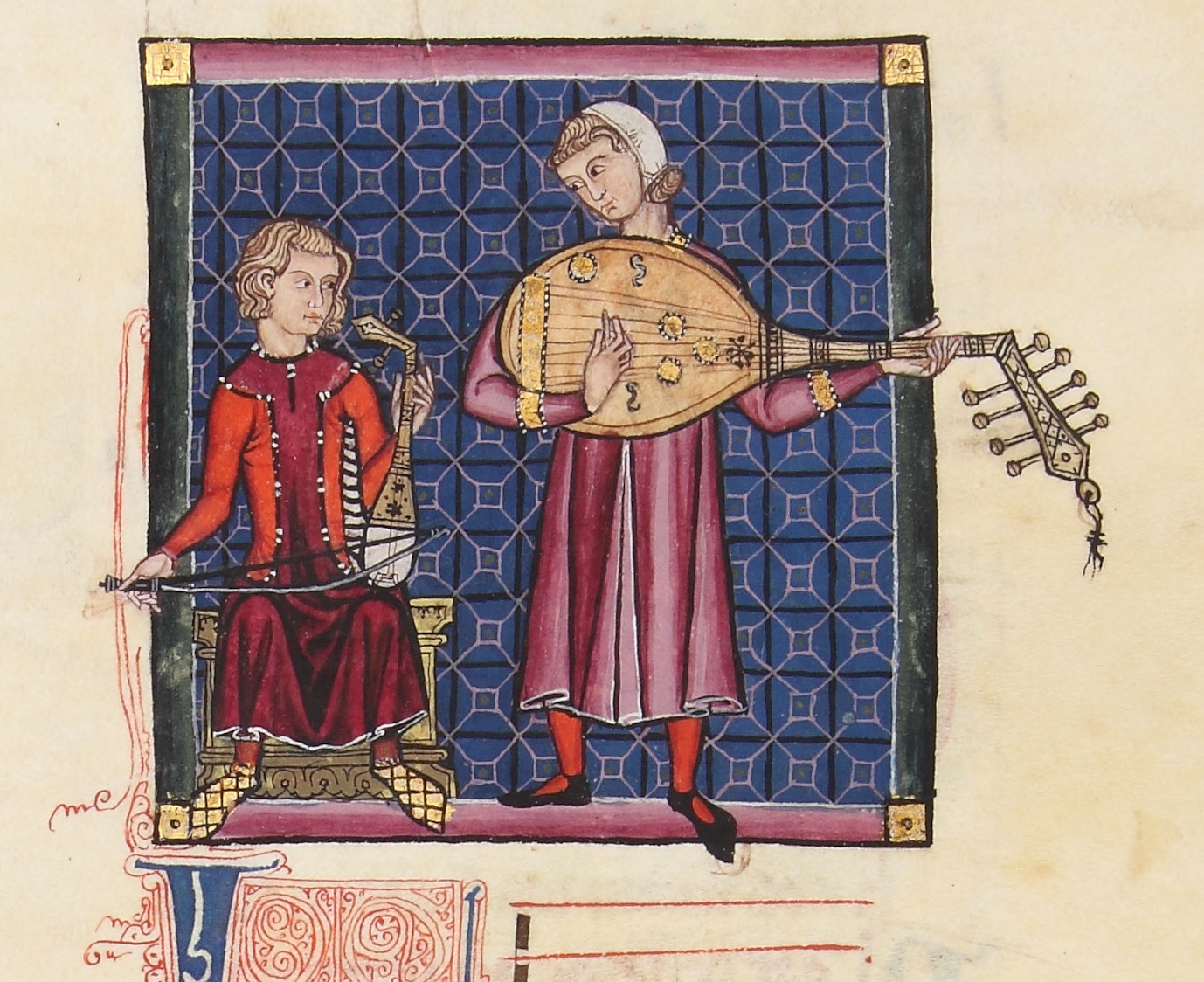
Al Andalus, Cantigas de Santa Maria, large instrument has been called barbat, oud and lute. Smaller instrument is a type of rubab or rebab.

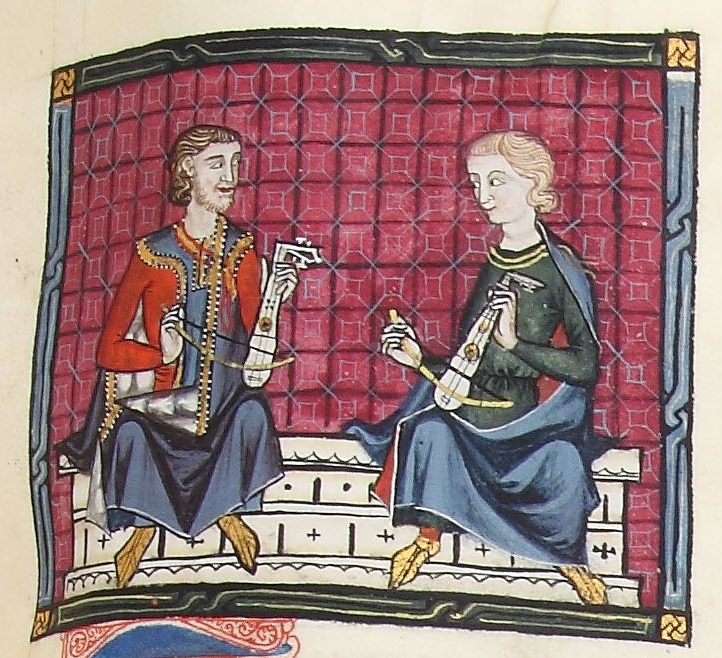
Al Andalus, Cantigas de Santa Maria, Andalusian or Magreb rebab

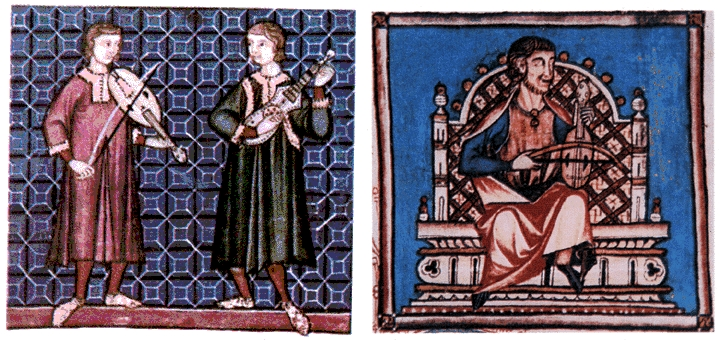
Al Andalus, Cantigas de Santa Maria, Right Image:Vielle or viola de arco and citole or guitarra latina. Left image Vielle

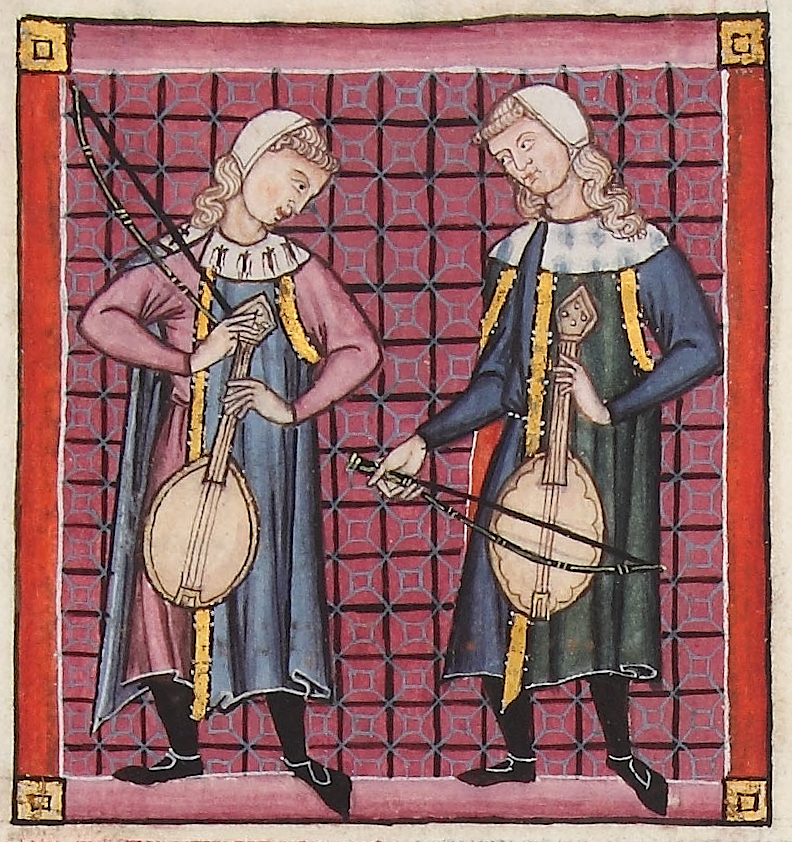
Al Andalus, Cantigas de Santa Maria, unknown fiddles

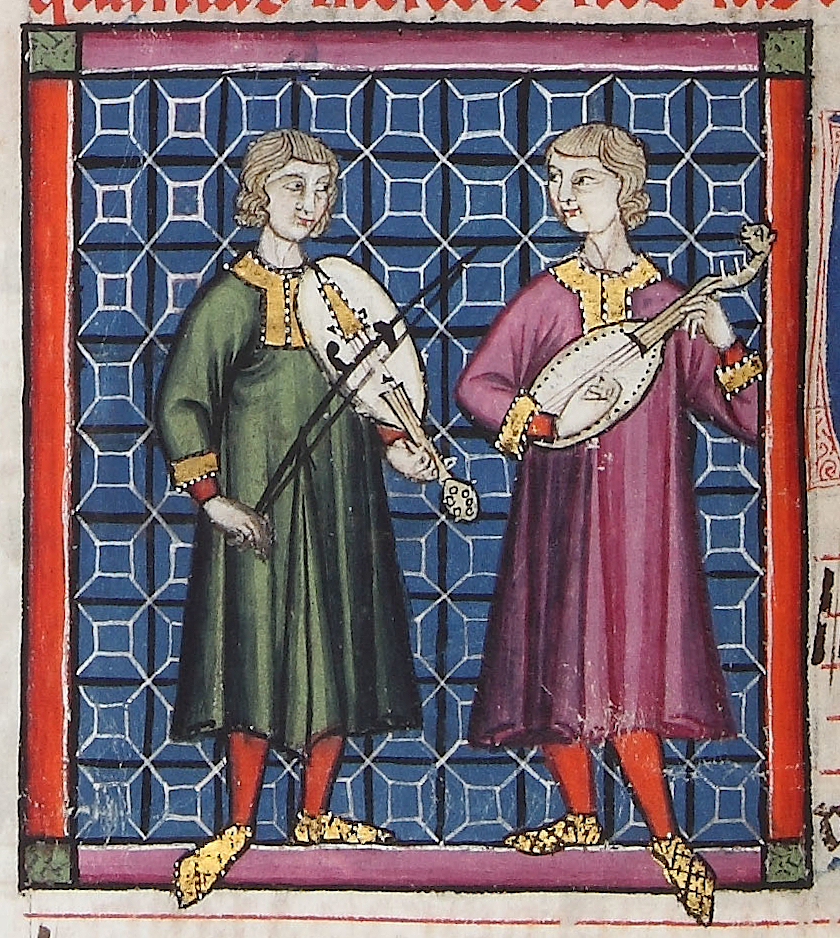
Al Andalus, Cantigas de Santa Maria, fiddle and plucked fiddle.

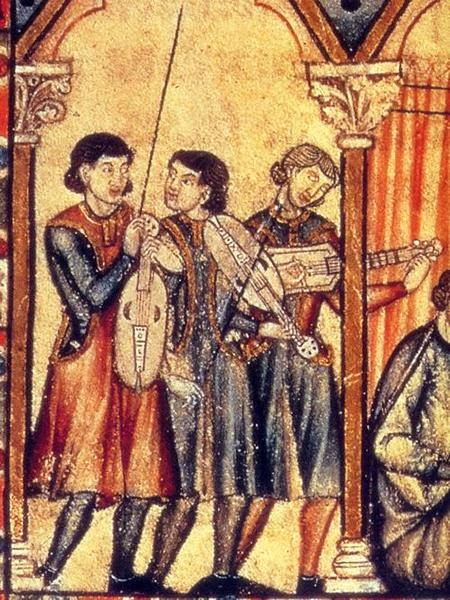
two vielles and a citole

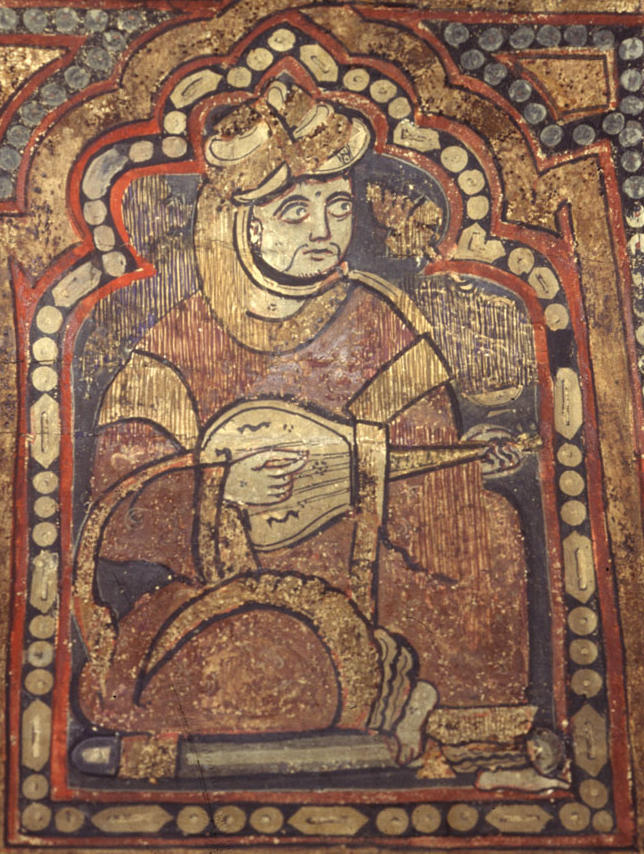
Sicily, c. 1140 AD. Lute family instrument or rubab. Not clear whether wood or leather top; both rubab and lute style soundholes.

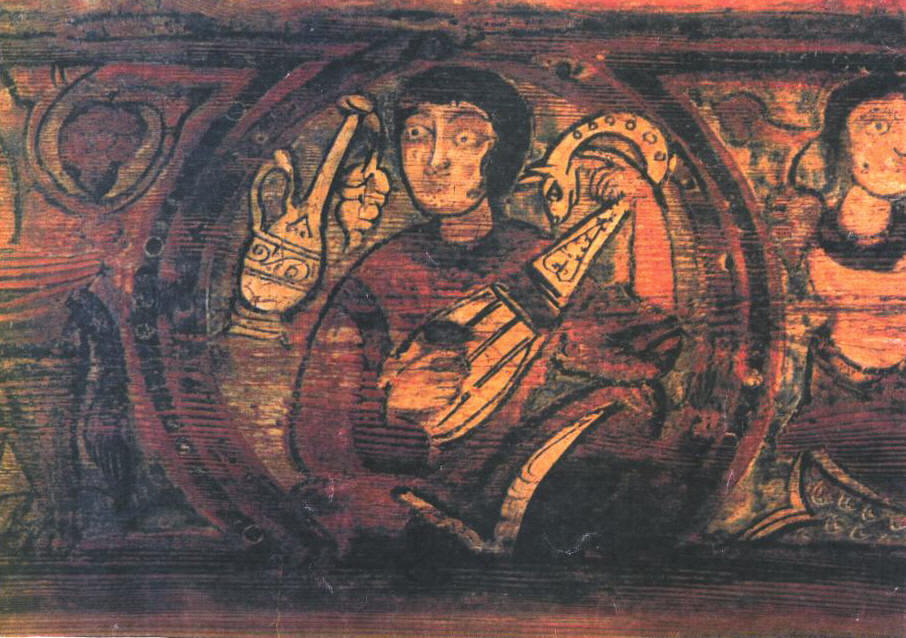
Sicily, 12th century image from the Cefalù Cathedral. Skin topped lute, possibly guitarra morisca or rubab

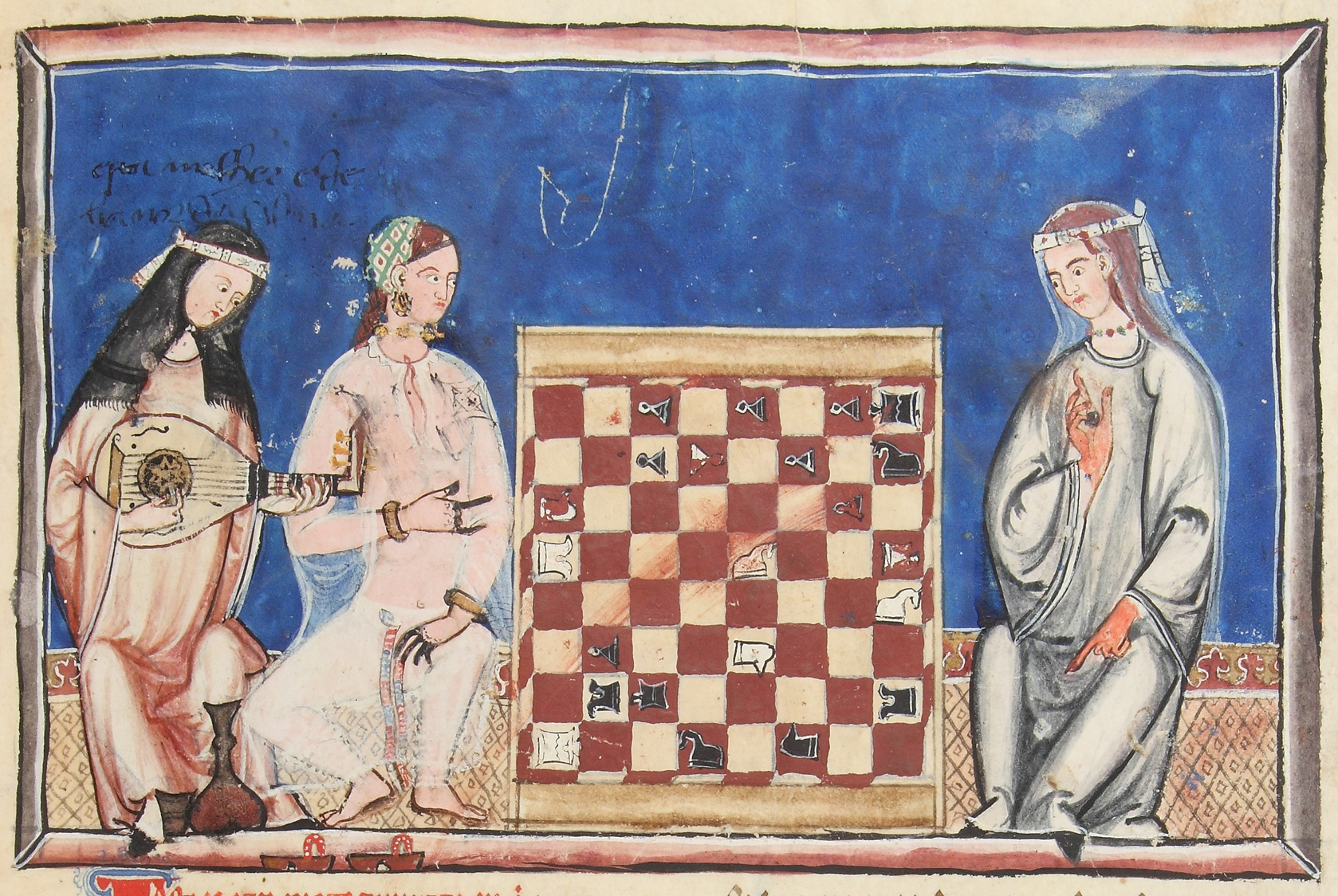
León and Galicia, c. 1283. European image of Muslim Spain, showing a European woman, playing lute or oud for Moorish women.

== Indo-Persian-Chinese-Mongolian culture ==
Double-chambered lutes: India, Central Asia, China, Mongolia

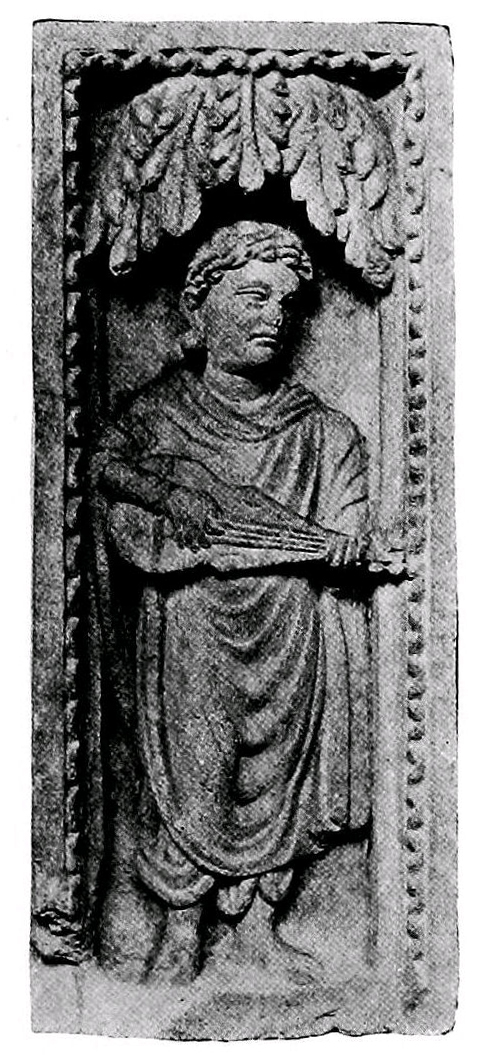
Kushan lute, 1st to 3rd century AD. Found in Yusufzai district near Peshawar, Pakistan. In related instruments, the round section is a skin soundboard.

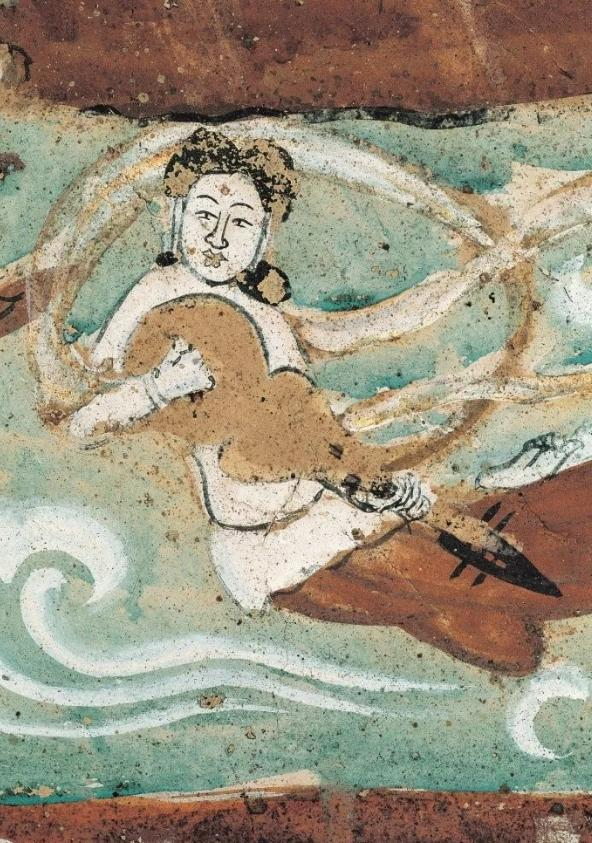
Chinese double-chambered lute, Mogao Cave 322, Early Tang dynasty (618–704 AD) Possible lutes include the huobosi and a calabash-back huluqin 葫蘆琴.

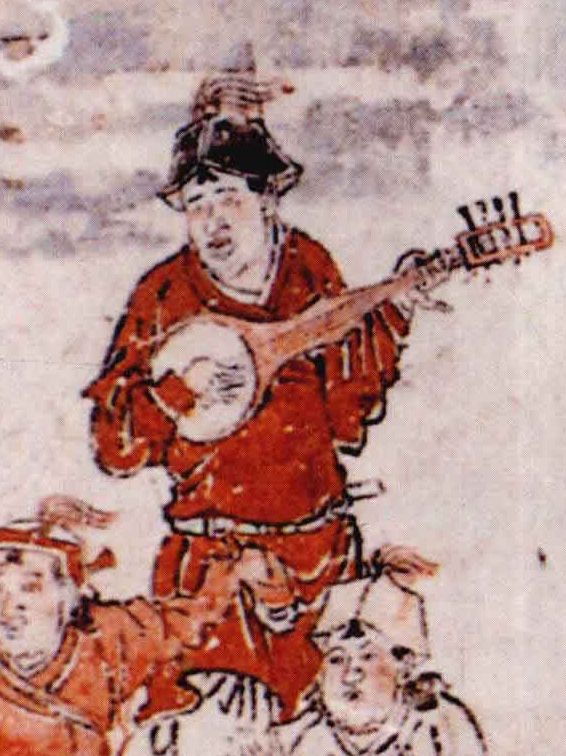
Mongolian lute, c. 1297, Tomb of Wang Qing, China. Probable shidurghū or sugudu. Possibly version of sanxian.

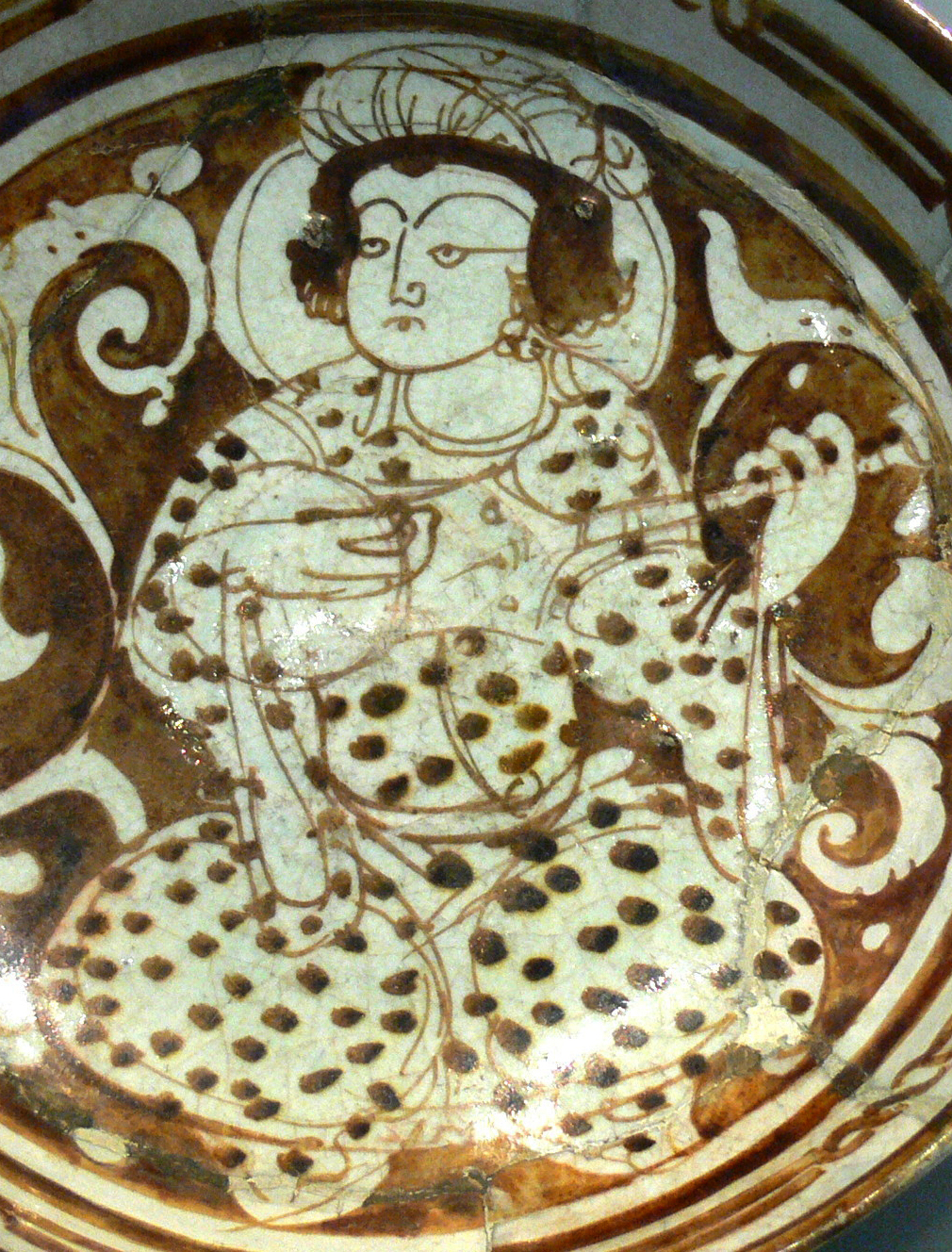
Iranian style rubab from the 13th century AD, found in Rayy (near Tehran, Iran).

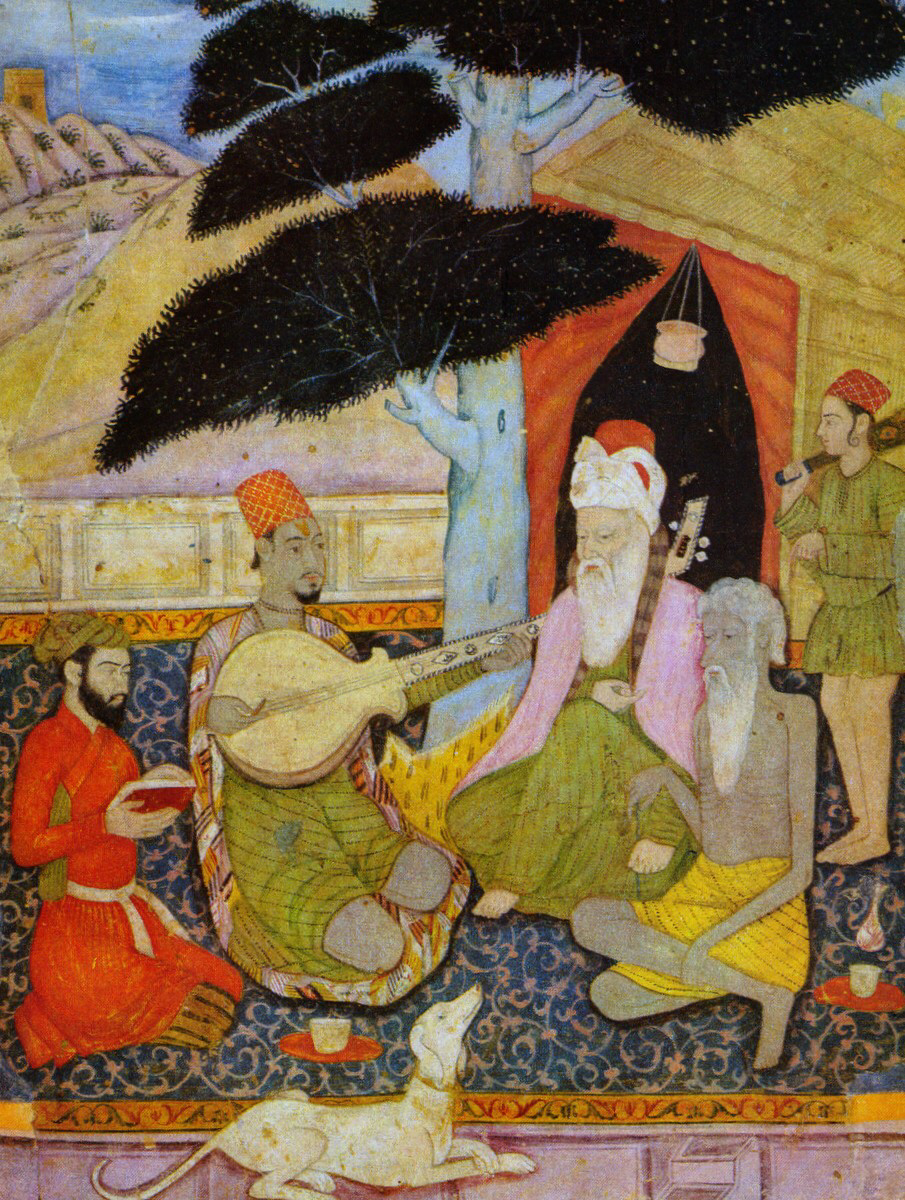
Music in Golkonda, 1660–1670. Musician plays a form of rubab known in India today as the seni rabab. A similar bowed version still exists today, the Kamaica.

Surviving related instruments include the medieval Iranian rubab, the rubab of Afghanistan, Pakistan and Northern India, the Indian sarod, sursingar and kamaica, the Nepali tungana, the Bangladeshi, Bengali and Assamese dotara, the Tibetan and Bhutanese dramyen or zhamunian, the Pamiri rubab, the Uyghur rawap.

In China the huobosi (火不思), also called the hubo (胡撥), and the sugudu (苏古笃), both with 4 strings are still played by the Naxi people. Historical variants known from writing include the shidurghū or sanxian (3 strings classically, modern 4 strings), qūpūz-e rumī (5 double strings), qūpūz-e ozan (3 single strings), and rūdkhānī."

The family of instruments blended Persian and Indian cultures, and has been played by Hindus, Buddhists, Muslims and Zoastrians. The instruments share a common name, because the vowel sounds are not always indicated in Arabic script. Plucked and bowed versions have shared the name.

In areas around the Himalayas, variations of the rubab developed, part of Indo-Persian culture. From India, north through Pakistan, Nepal, into Persian/Turk areas of Central Asia, a group of barbed lutes and double-chested, skin-topped lutes developed. Today these include both plucked and bowed instruments, the sarod, rubab, sarinda, rebab, tungana.

The instruments had a connection to the steppes horse cultures, that conquered from China to Europe in waves of invaders. Images have been found from Mongolian peoples in northern China, to the Turkic and Persian peoples in Northern India, Central Asia and Iran. Like the barbat and oud, these instruments went both east and west. They can be found in Nepal, Tibet, Southeast Asia and China. The instruments also traveled through Arabia (and on boats from there to Southeast Asia), across Northern Africa to the Iberian peninsula.

=== Chinese sanxian ===
It has been suggested that the sanxian, a form of spike lute, may have its origin in the Middle East, and older forms of spike lute were also found in ancient Egypt. Similar instruments may have been present in China as early as the Qin dynasty as qin pipa (pipa was used as a generic term in ancient China for many other forms of plucked chordophones) or xiantao (弦鼗). Some thought that the instrument may have been re-introduced into China together with other instruments such as huqin by the Mongols during the Yuan dynasty (1271–1368), however, an image of a sanxian-like instrument was found in a stone sculpture dating from the Southern Song period (1217–79). The first record of the name "sanxian" may be found in a Ming dynasty text.

The instrument was transmitted to other East Asian countries, for example to Japan as shamisen.

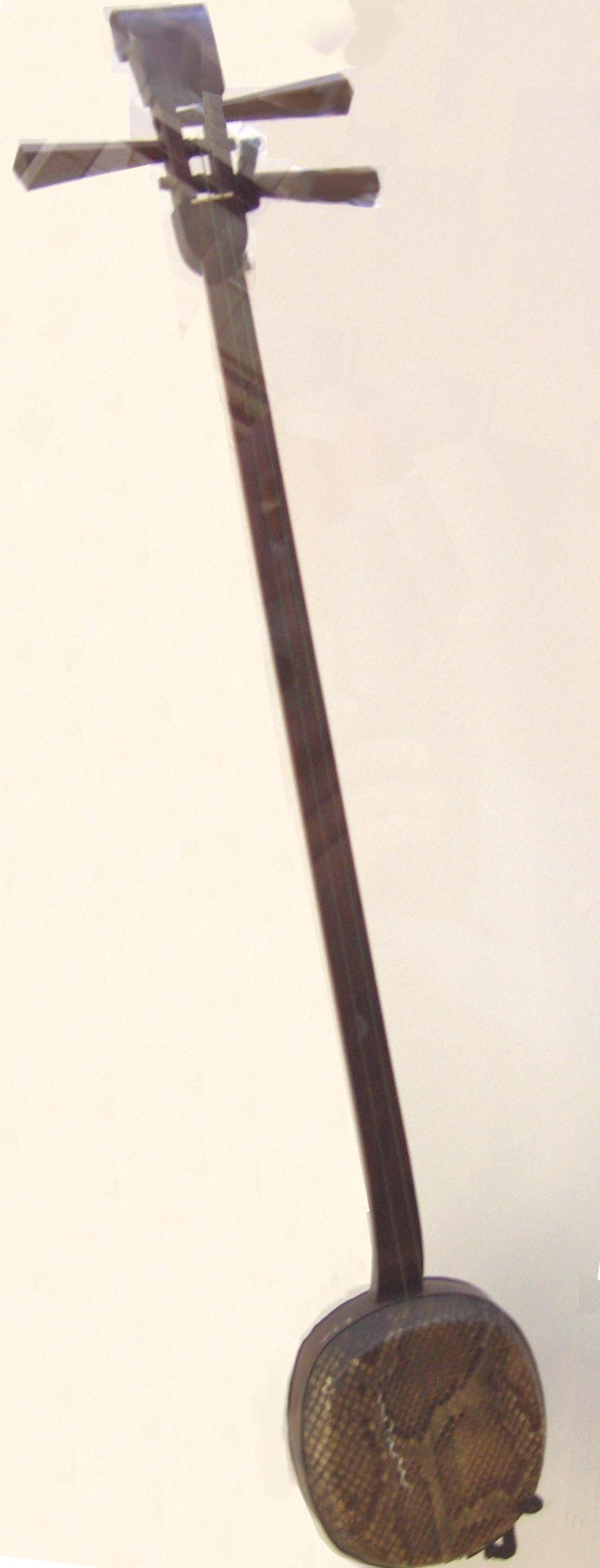
A sanxian

=== Gambus and rabâb, skin tops plucked and bowed, rebab, rubab rabâb, robab ===
Rababs, rebabs, or rebecs in Europe, c. 1260

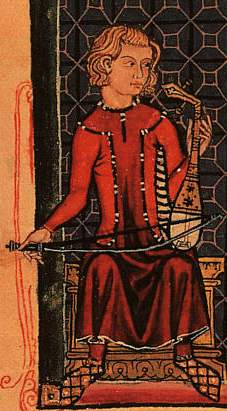
Rebab player. 2 strings. Soundboard is cut in half. Sachs said of another example that this was probably wood and skin.

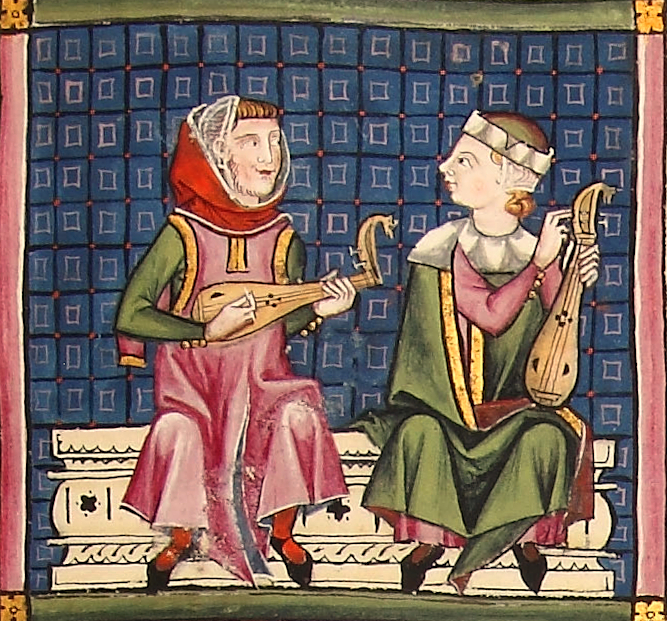
Three-string rebabs or rebecs with wooden soundboards. These have also been called gitterns an instrument ancestral to the guitar and according to Sachs the mandore/mandola.

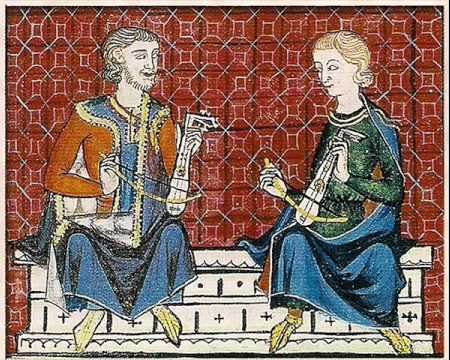
Rebabs of the same style that Sachs labels rabâb, now called Maghreb rebabs. 2 strings. Wood and skin soundboards. Examples were still being made in Morocco in 1991.

Sachs said these instruments entered Europe through Spain. He felt that they were the likely candidate for the Moorish guitar, "with shrill and harsh notes", and ultimately related to the mandore or mandola. The Cantigas de Santa Maria, c. 1260, captured some of the musical instruments introduced from Muslim dominated Andalusia to Southern Europe. The plucked and bowed versions existed alongside each other. The bowed instruments became the rebec and the plucked instruments became the gittern. Curt Sachs linked this instrument with the mandola, the kopuz and the gambus, and named the bowed version rabâb. When the Muslims were driven out of Spain, Andalusian music and instruments survived in North Africa, in the Maghreb.

In the late 8th century A.D. r-bab (rabāb) was used in Arabic for a plucked boat-shaped lute. The name would also be used for bowed spike lutes by the 900s A.D., mentioned by Al Farabi. The boat-shaped lute would become bowed as well, used in northern Africa as the Maghreb rebab and in Andalusia, becoming the rebec.

These were the instruments that Sachs talked about in The History of Musical Instruments, a second kind of short lute found in the "Islamic Near East", carved from a single piece of wood, no distinct neck and a pegbox that was sickle shaped. There was also a kind with "an inferior stringholder".

The instruments that would become the gambus with sickle shaped pegbox traveled east "as far as the Celebes in Southeast Asia and southwards to Madagascar off the east coast of Africa". Another scholar thinks they traveled across the Indian ocean as well on Yemeni ships, as the Yemeni quanbus The gambus is among the last of the family of skin-topped lutes which survive into the 21st century. Sachs names the instruments gambus, kabosa and qūpūz.

The gambus is plucked, but many of the variants are bowed. By the time the instrument became bowed, it was named rabâb, a name that has been used for long-necked skin topped instruments as well. The Cantigas de Santa Maria in Southern Spain had examples of both bowed and unbowed instruments.

The early instruments traveled west to enter Europe through Andalusia and Eastern Europe where they gained wooden tops and became lyras and rebecs. In Yemen, the instrument was known as the quanbus. It traveled to Southeast Asia with Yemeni sailors. Over time, some of these became intertwined with spike fiddles. Variations of these instruments can be found in China, Southeast Asia, Central Asia, and Europe.

Variations include the rebabs that spread via Islamic trading routes over much of North Africa, the Middle East, parts of Europe, and the Far East. The Medieval European Rebec, Croatian Lijerica, Cretan Cretan lyra, Bulgarian Gadulka and Russian Gudok, the Gusle used in Serbia, Romania, Albania and Bulgaria, the Eastern Mediterranean Kemenche and Persian Kamancheh, the Kazakh Kobyz, Bangladeshi Ektara are variations.

=== Gallery: skin topped lutes and rubabs ===
These can blur the line between long-necked instruments and short necked. The soundbox is, in some cases, so long that it effectively adds to the instrument's scale-length, like a long neck.

==== Gambus or qanbus ====
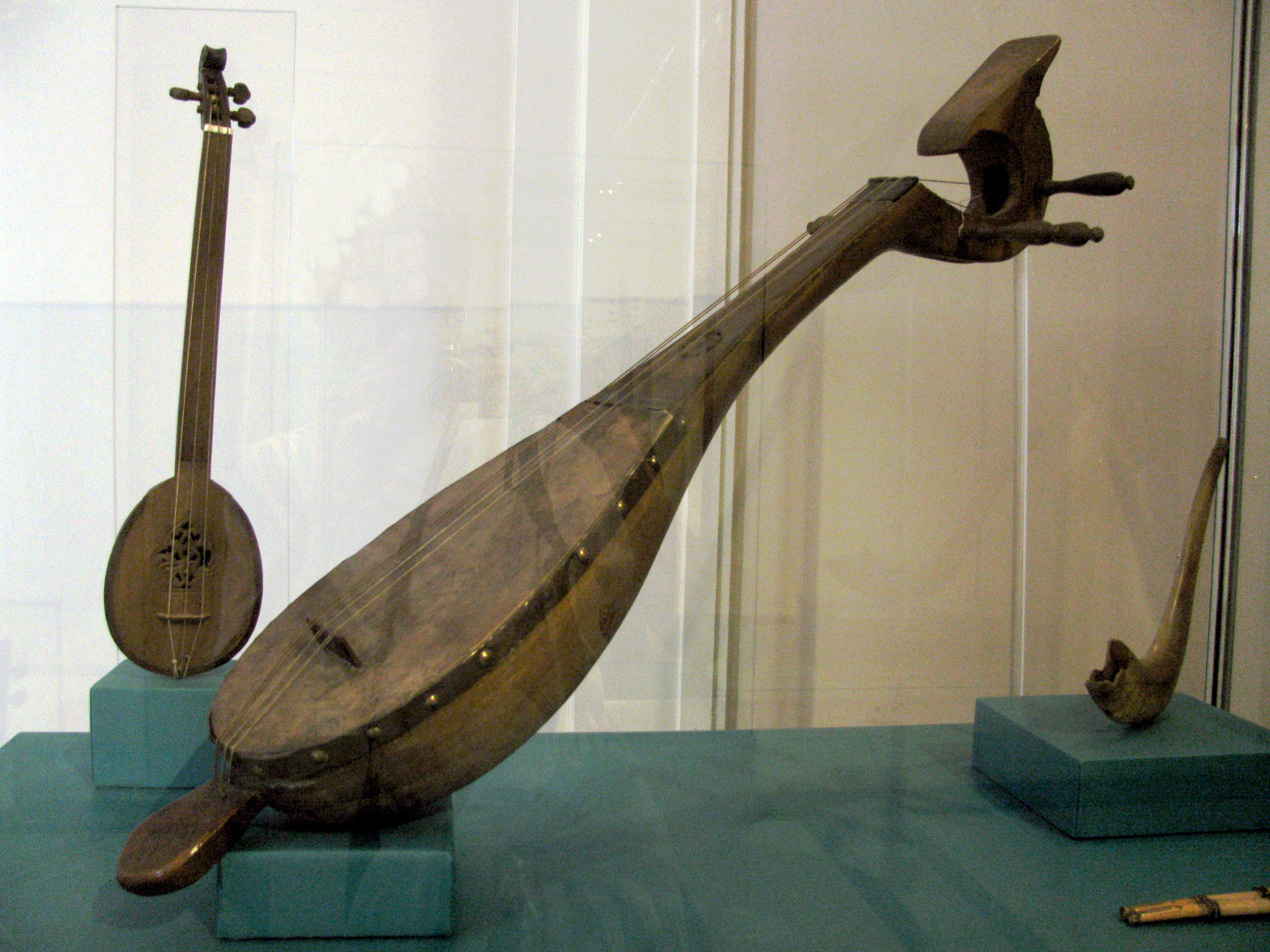
Yemen or Indonesia. Gambus or qanbūs

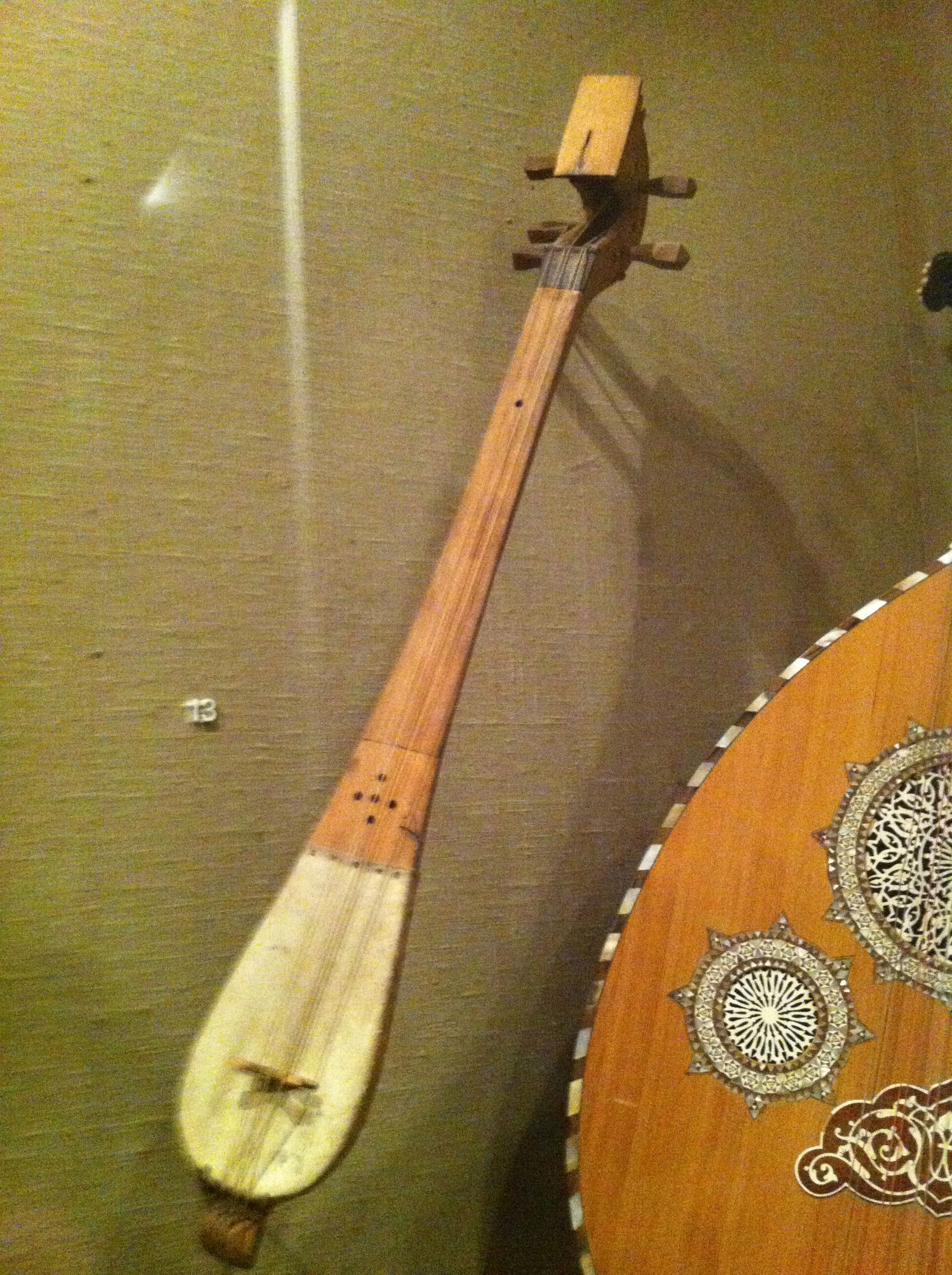
Syria, 1899. Qanbūs.

==== Short-necked rabab with double sound chamber ====
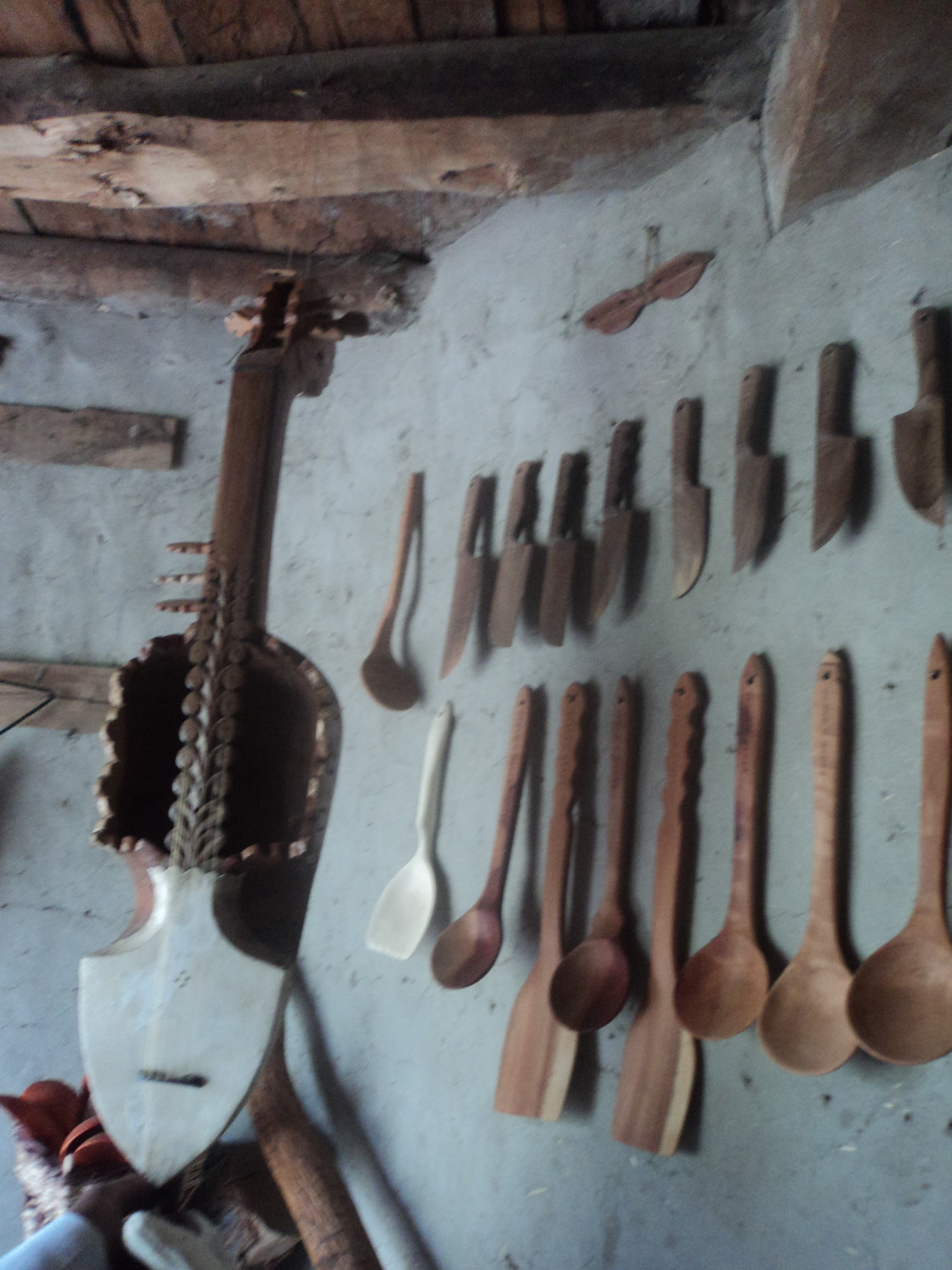
Pakistan. Rubab with upper sound chamber expose

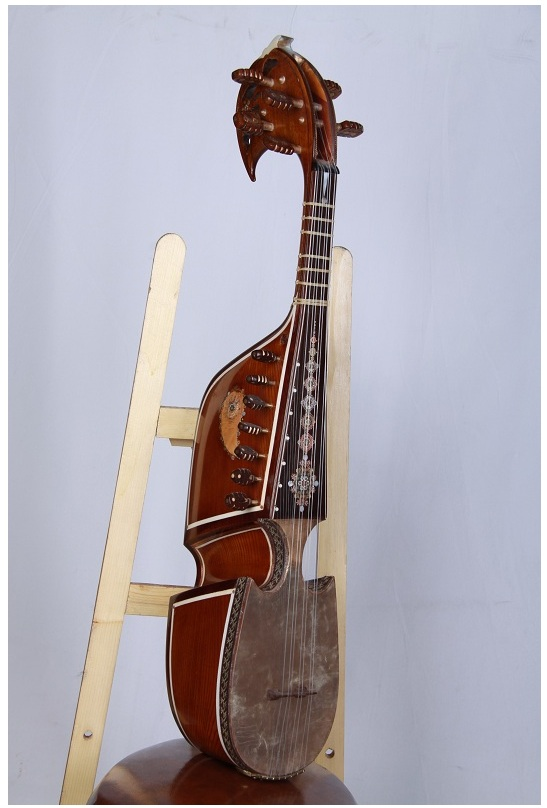
Iran. Robab, upper sound chamber covered with wood, top has frets

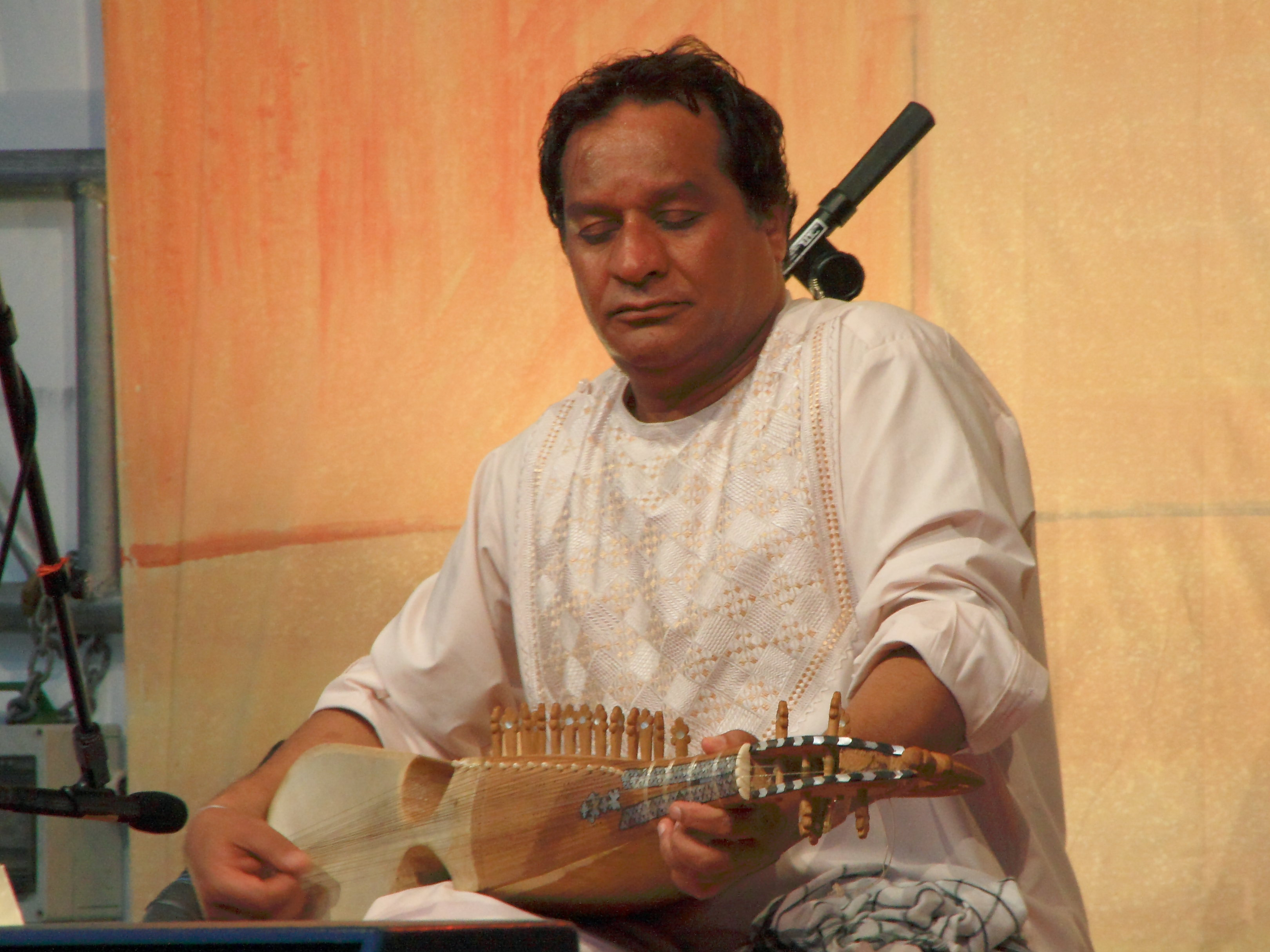
Afghanistan. Rubab, top has frets

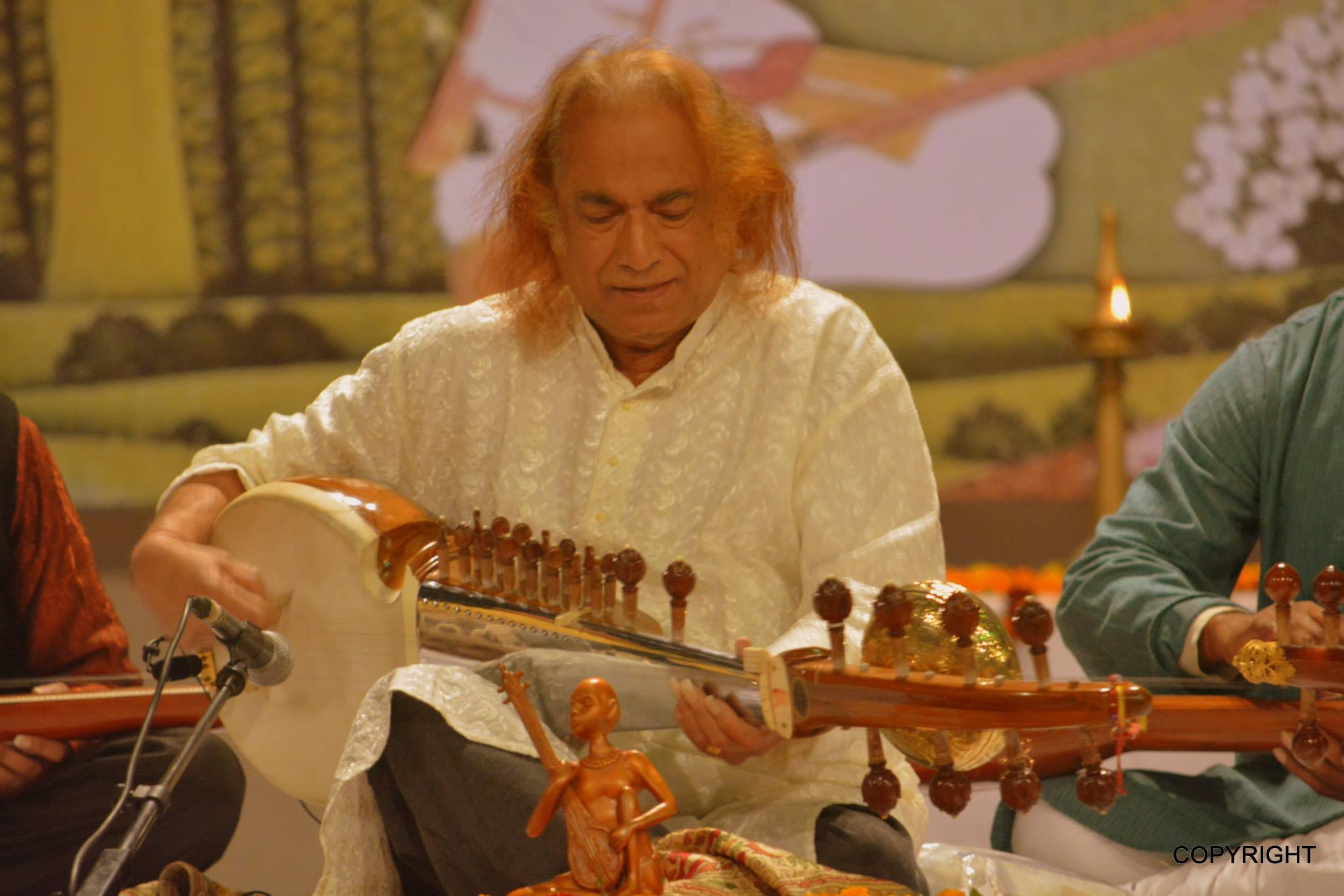
India. Sarod, has no frets

==== Barbed lutes, long-necked with double chamber or chamber extending into neck ====
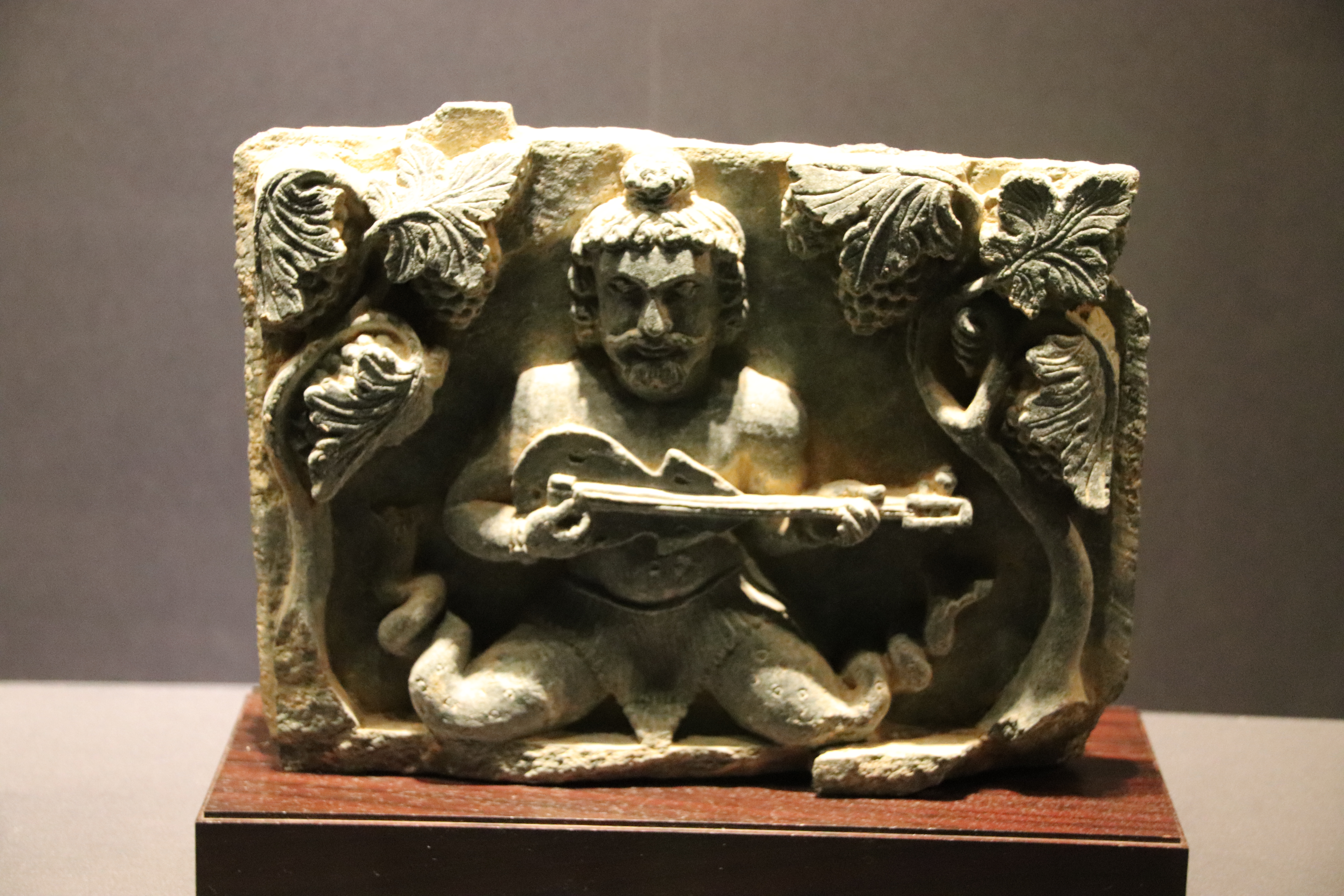
1st-3rd century A.D. Nereus or possibly Triton playing a double chamber lute.

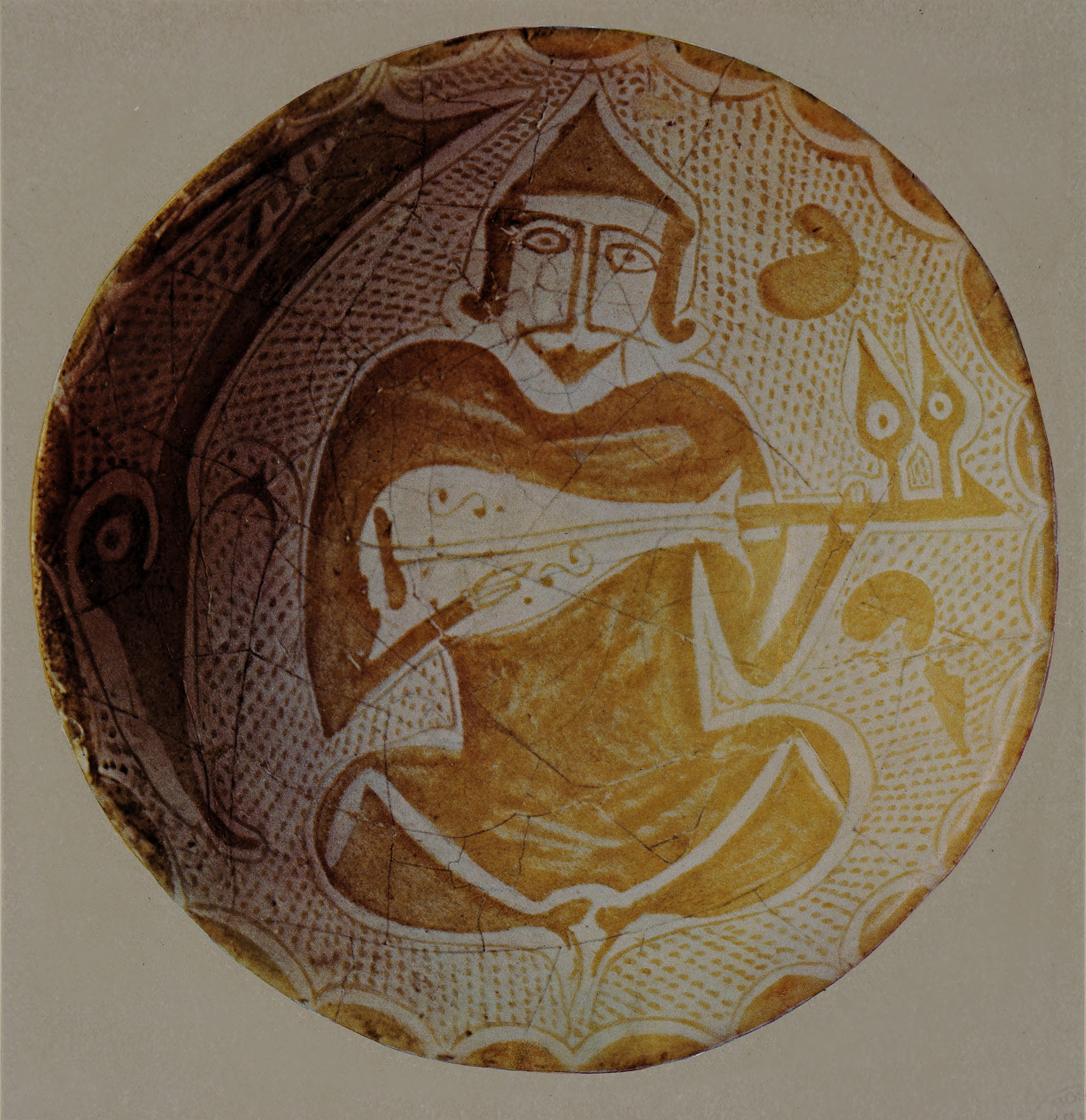
10th century A.D., Iraq. Rubab that blends instrument types. Body becomes a hollowed neck; the neck is extended with an inserted stick (making it a spike lute or tang lute).

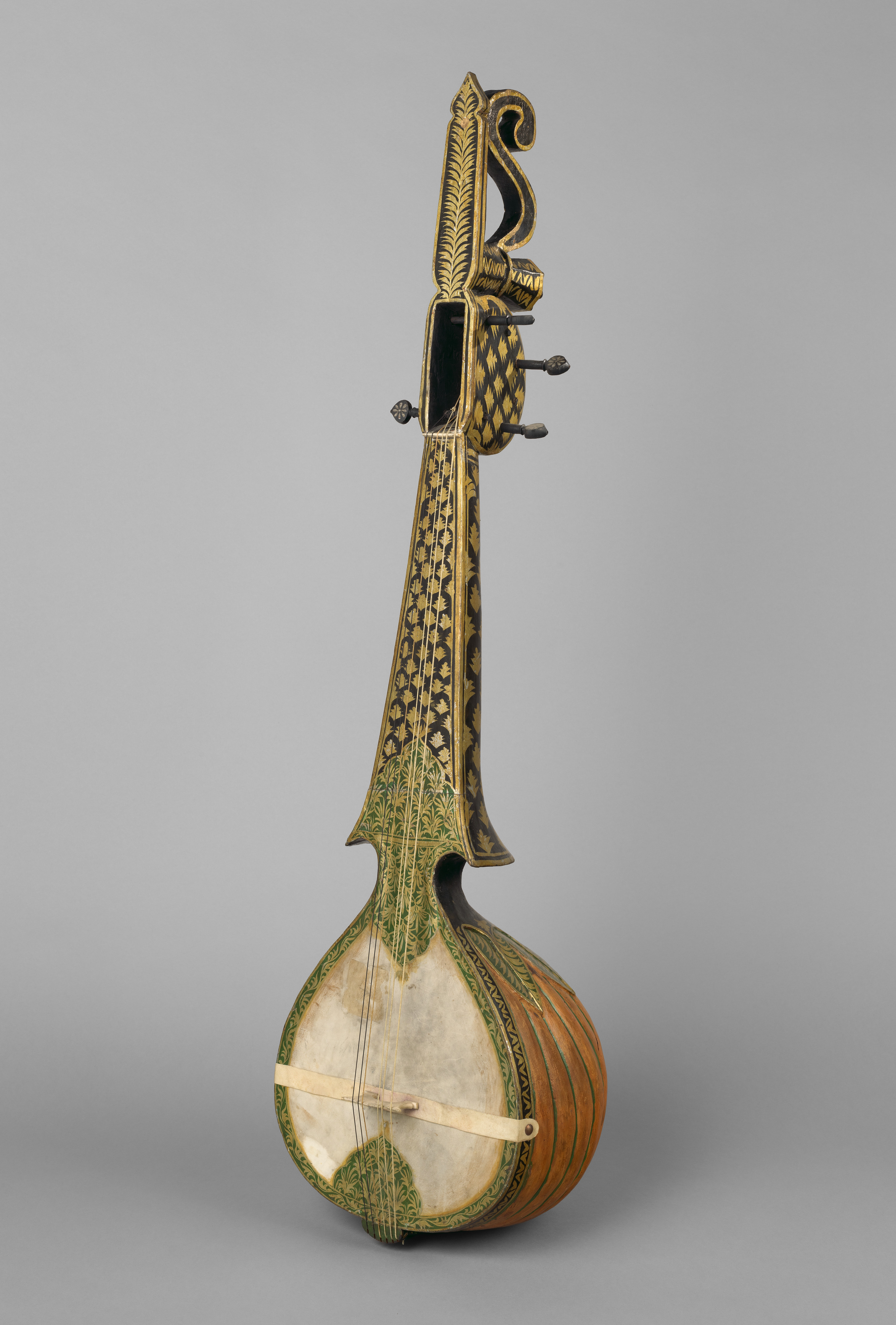
India (Northern). Rabab c. 1885, Metropolitan Museum of Art. Was called rudra veena when collected.

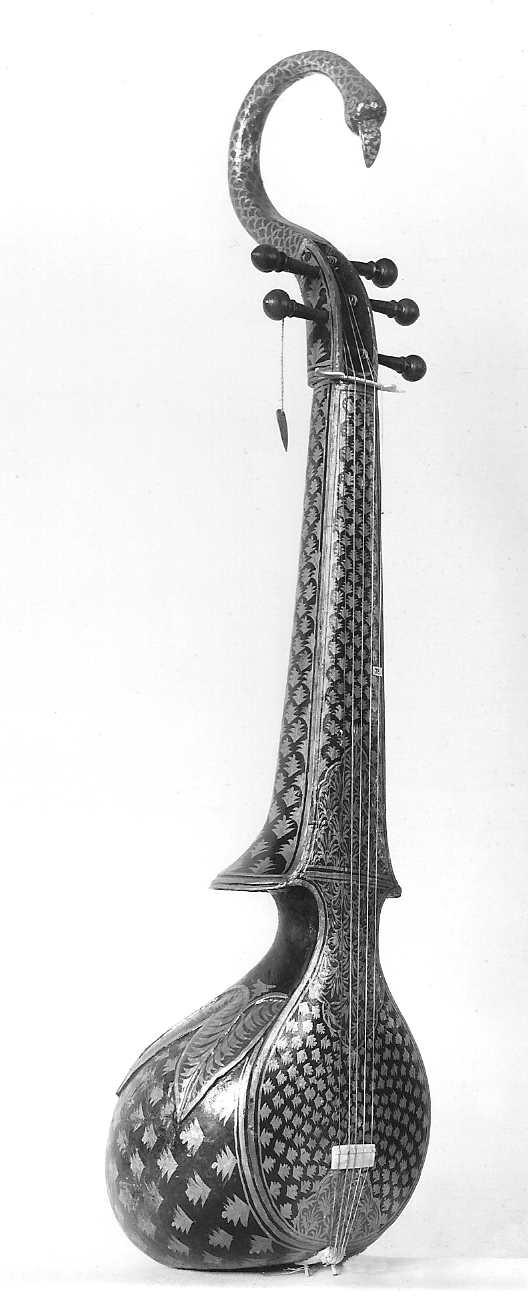
Sursingar or sursanga, 19th century by Ali Akbar Khan. Metropolitan Museum of Art

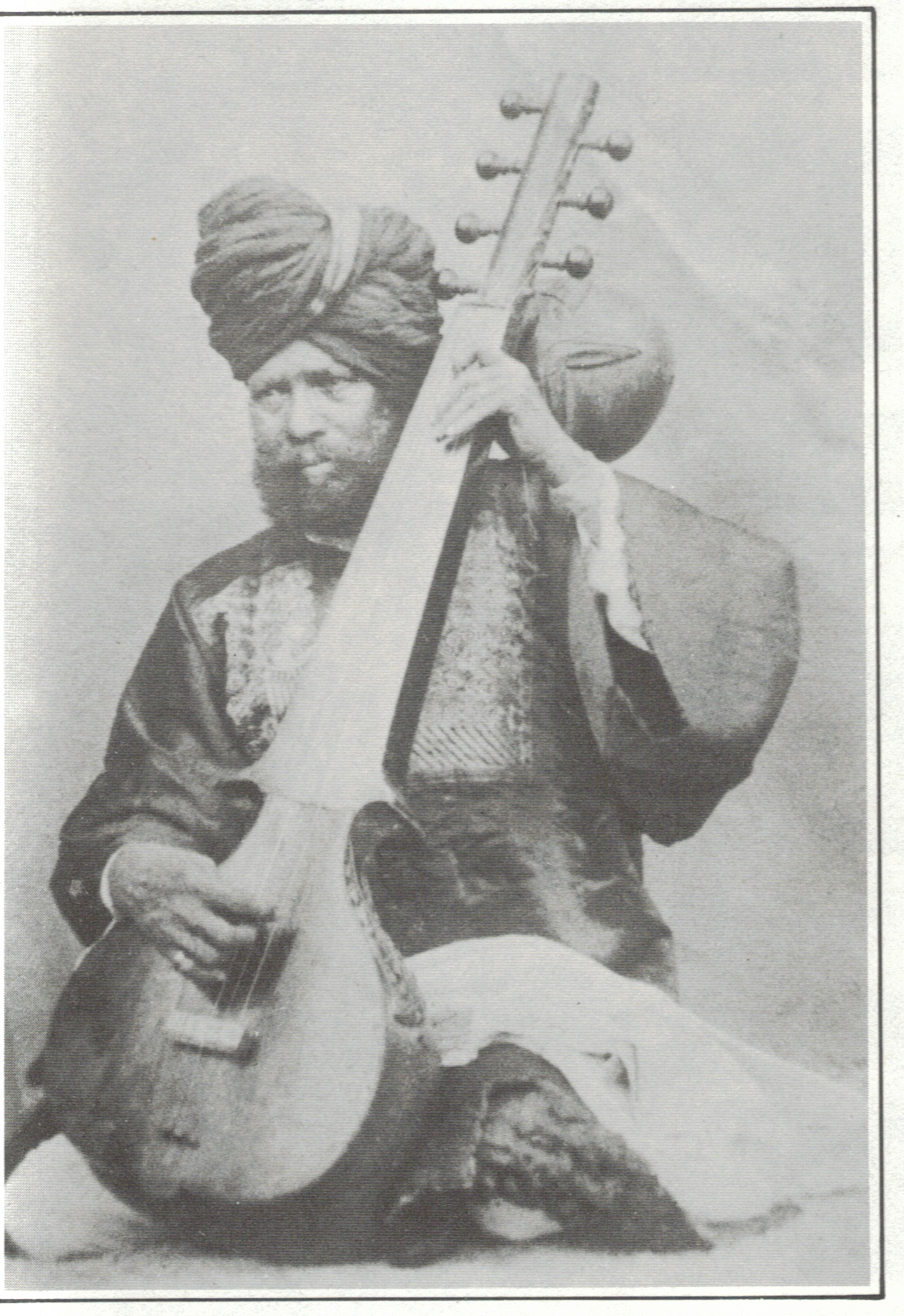
Sursingar player

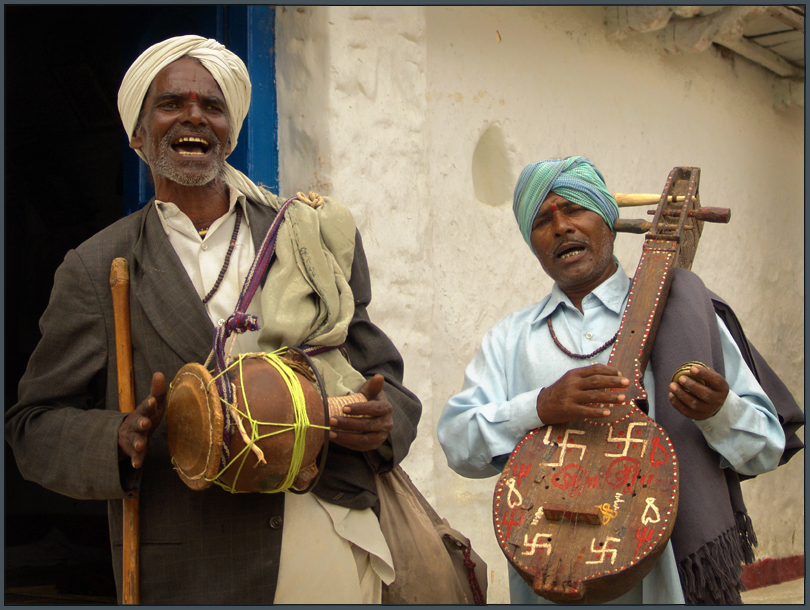
Tambura; this one is very similar in shape to the bowed Kamaica and Seni rebab

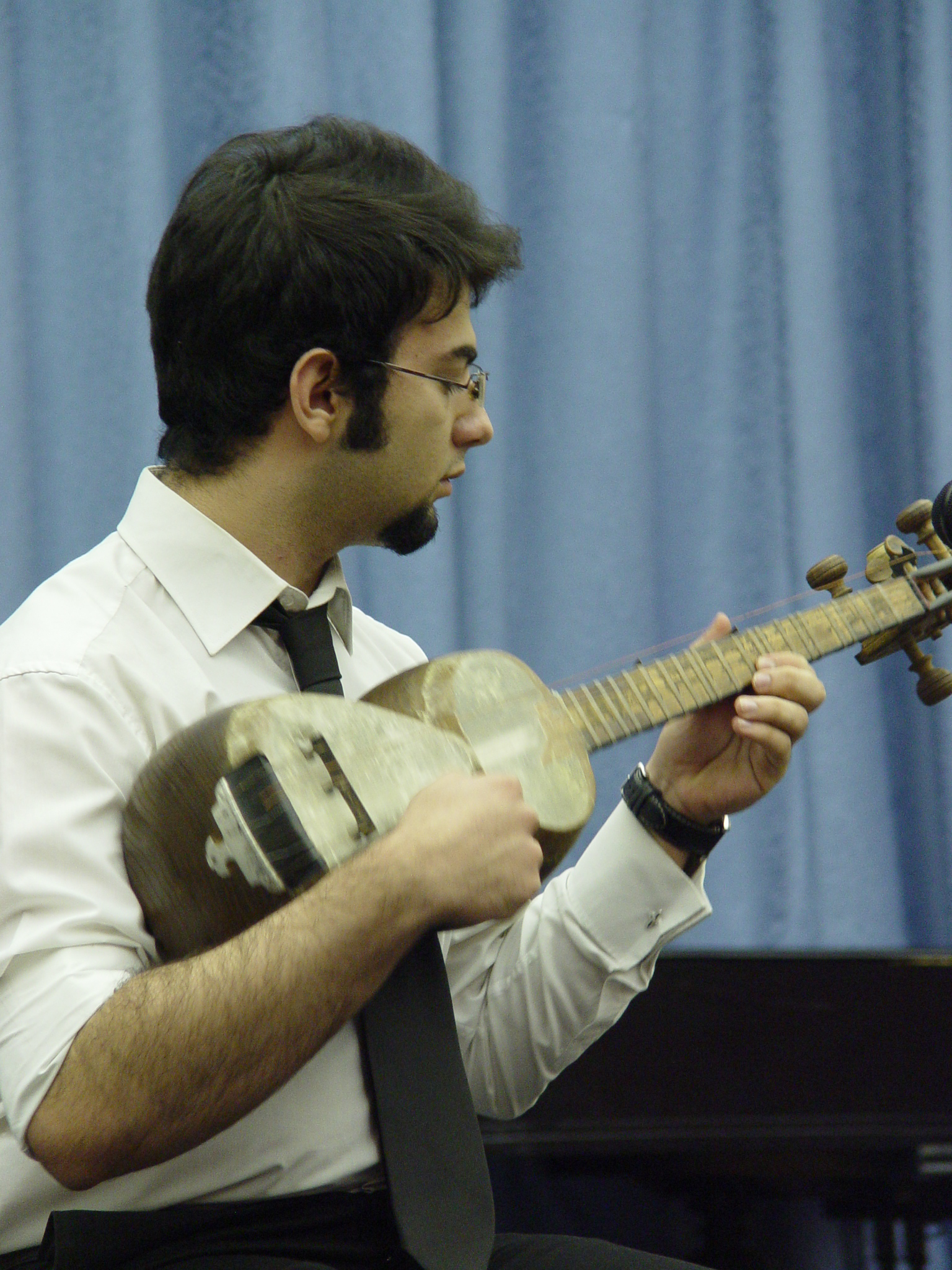
Iran. Tar, double sound chambers with a skin top

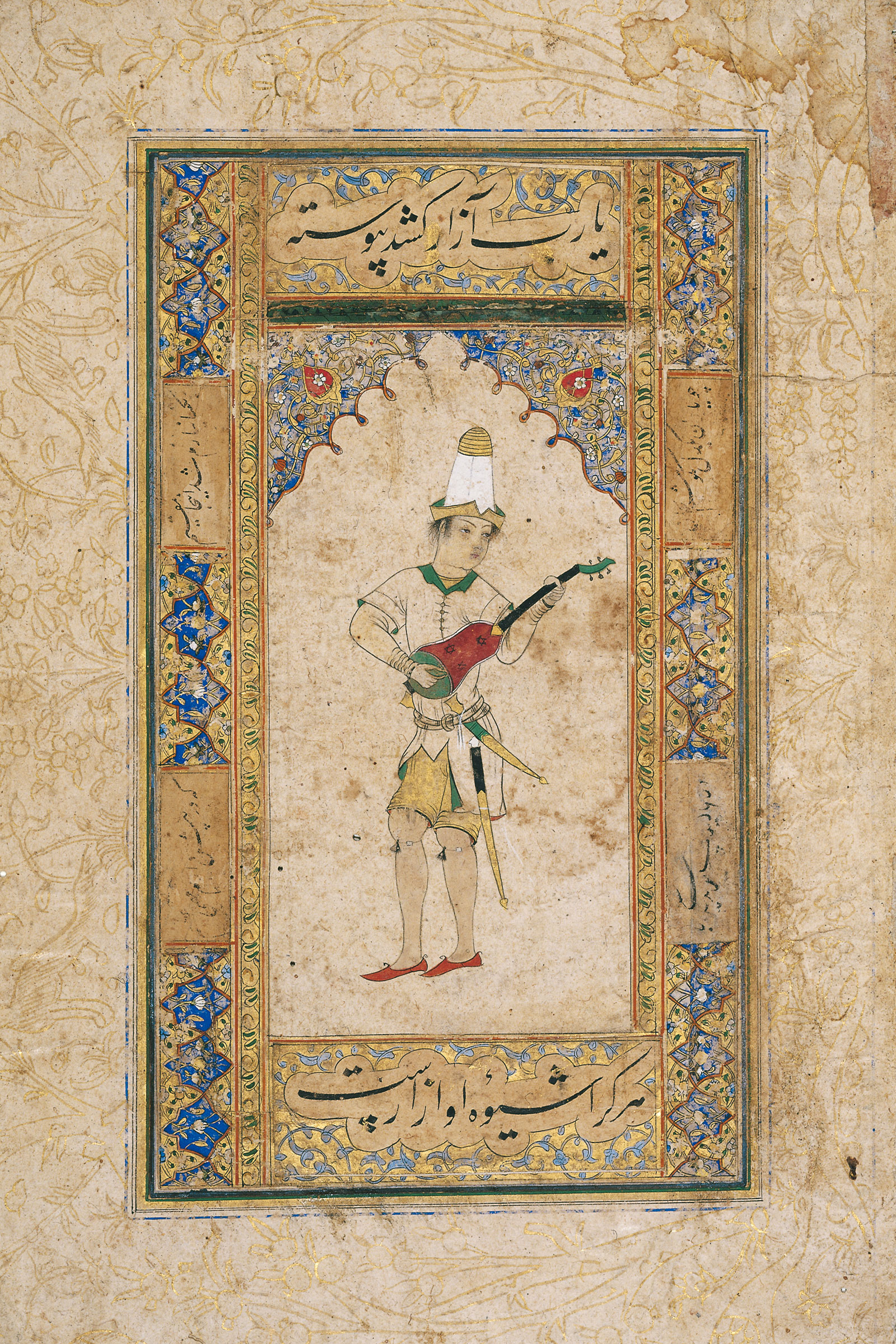
Iran, rubab or tar, (possibly showing wooden upper top, skin lower top), c. late 16th century AD

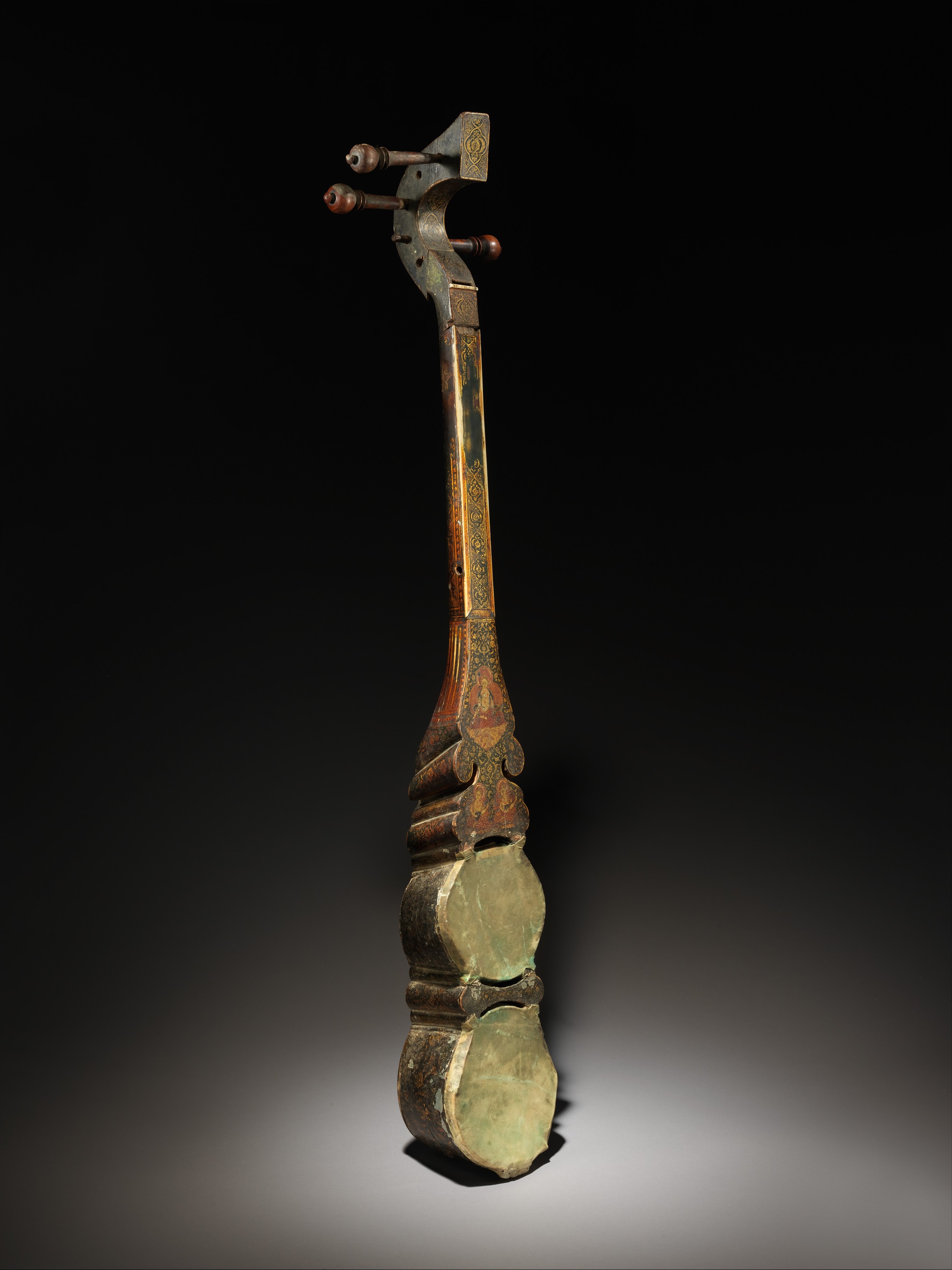
Sgra-Snyan, 14th–16th centuries, Tibetan. Two sound chambers

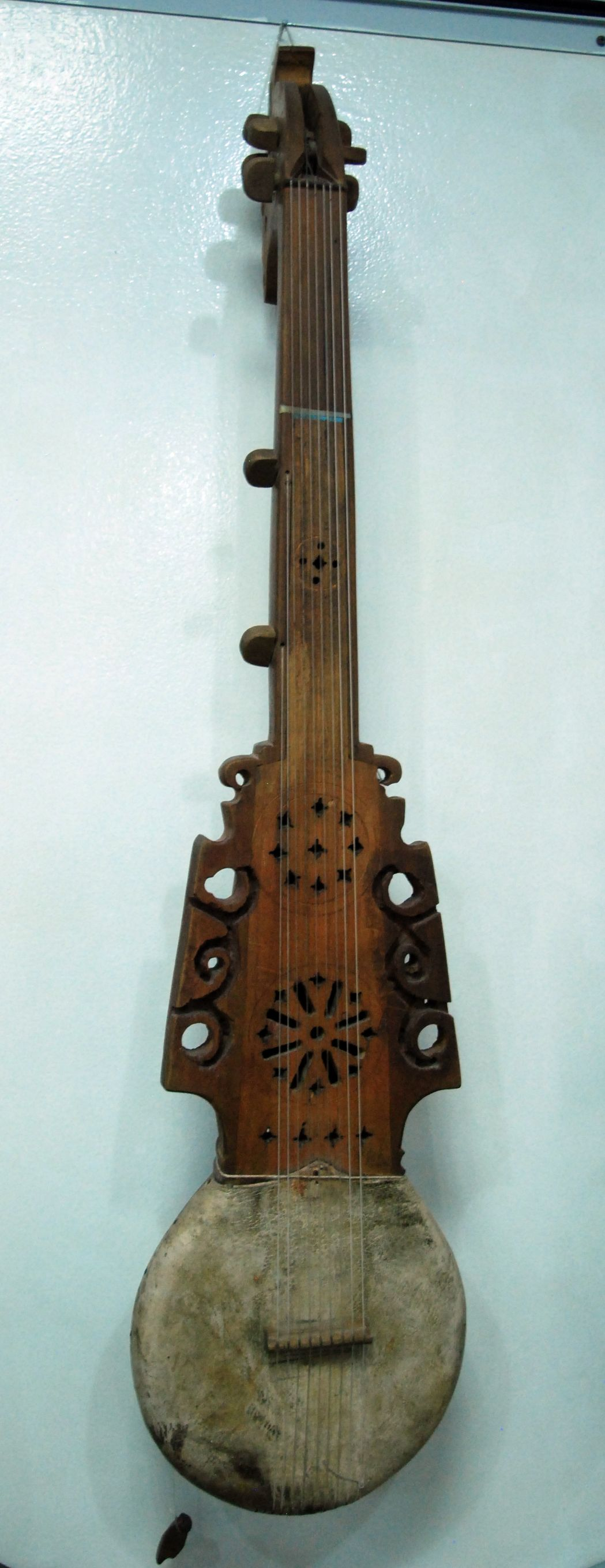
Pamiri rubab, longer necked type of rubab, sound holes up neck show it is hollow

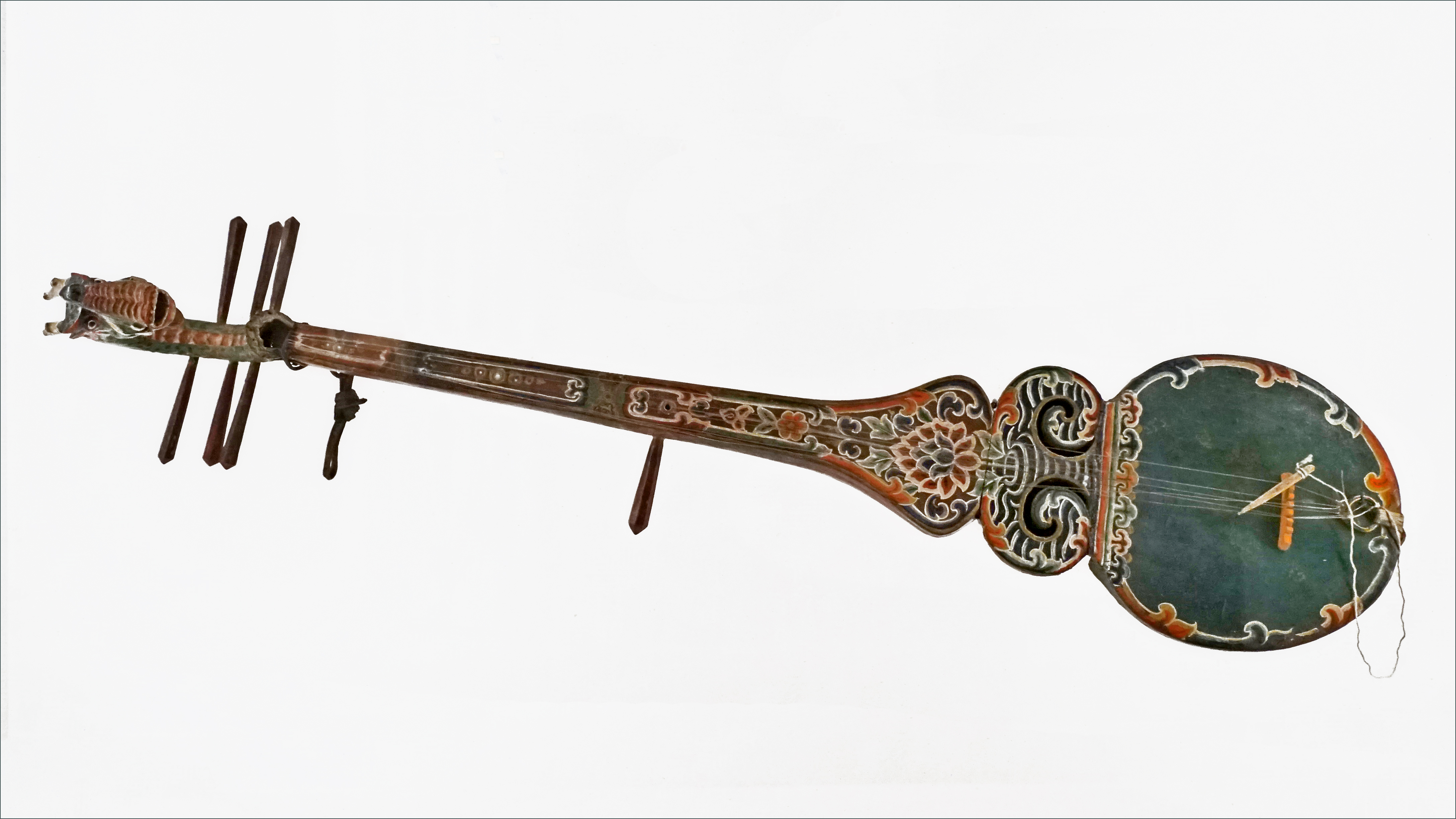
Bhutan. Dranyen.

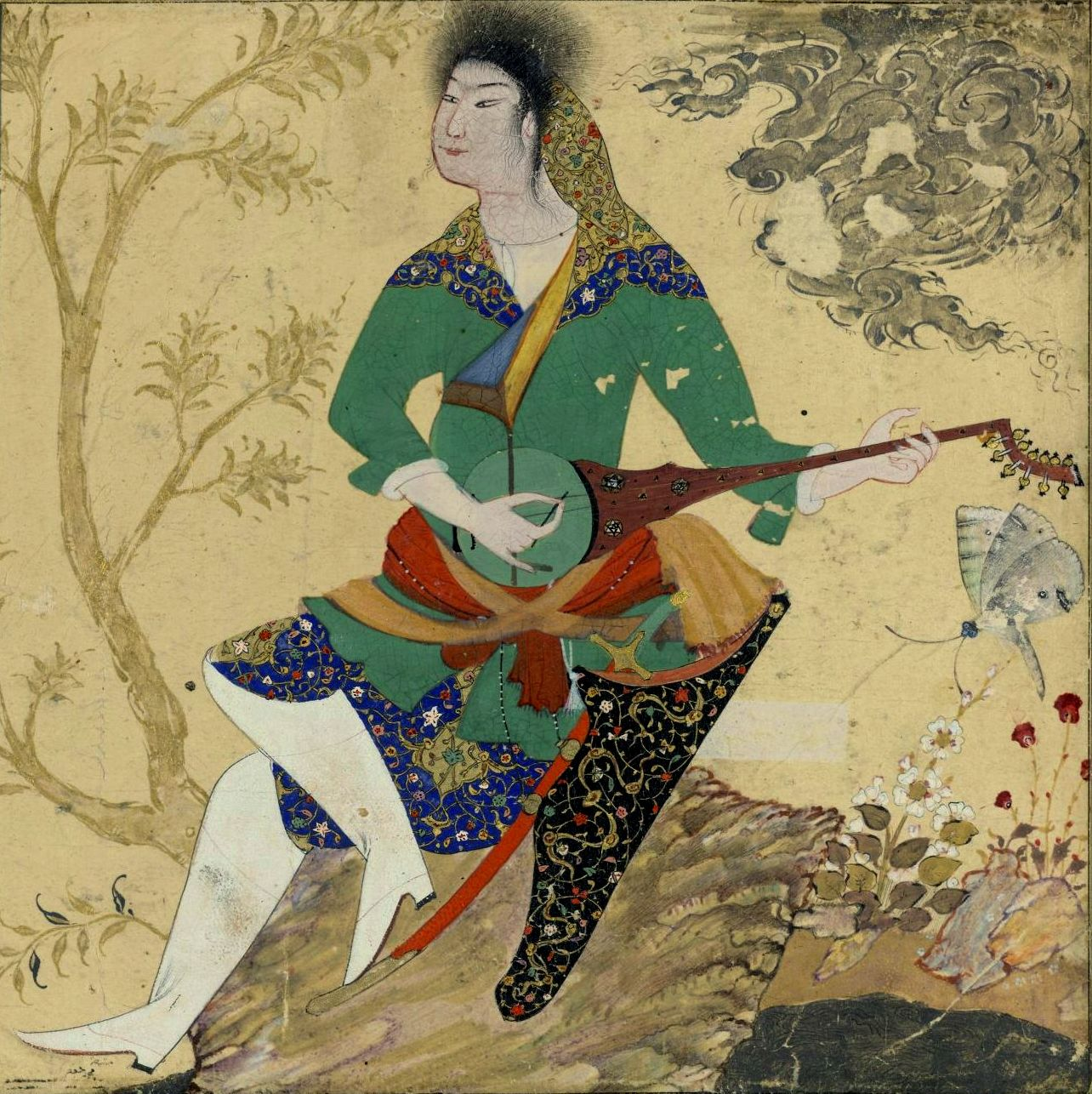
Iranian style rubab c. 1590, longer neck, painted by Muhammad Jaffar

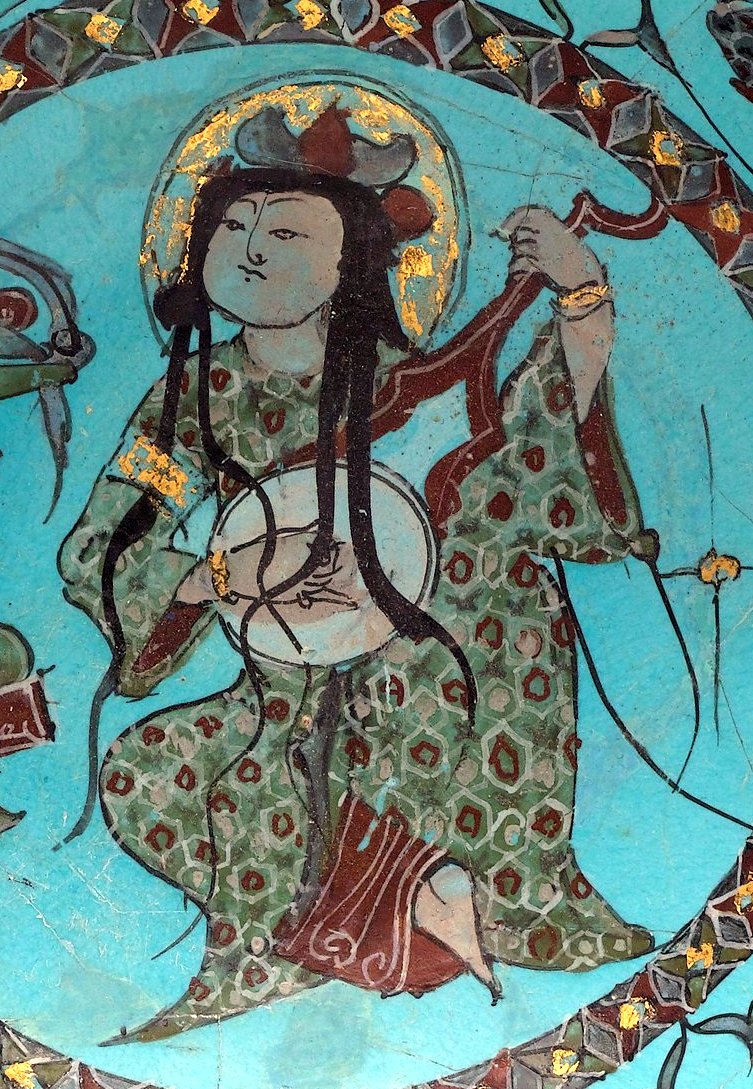
Iranian or Persian rubab, late-12th to early 13th century AD, Iran

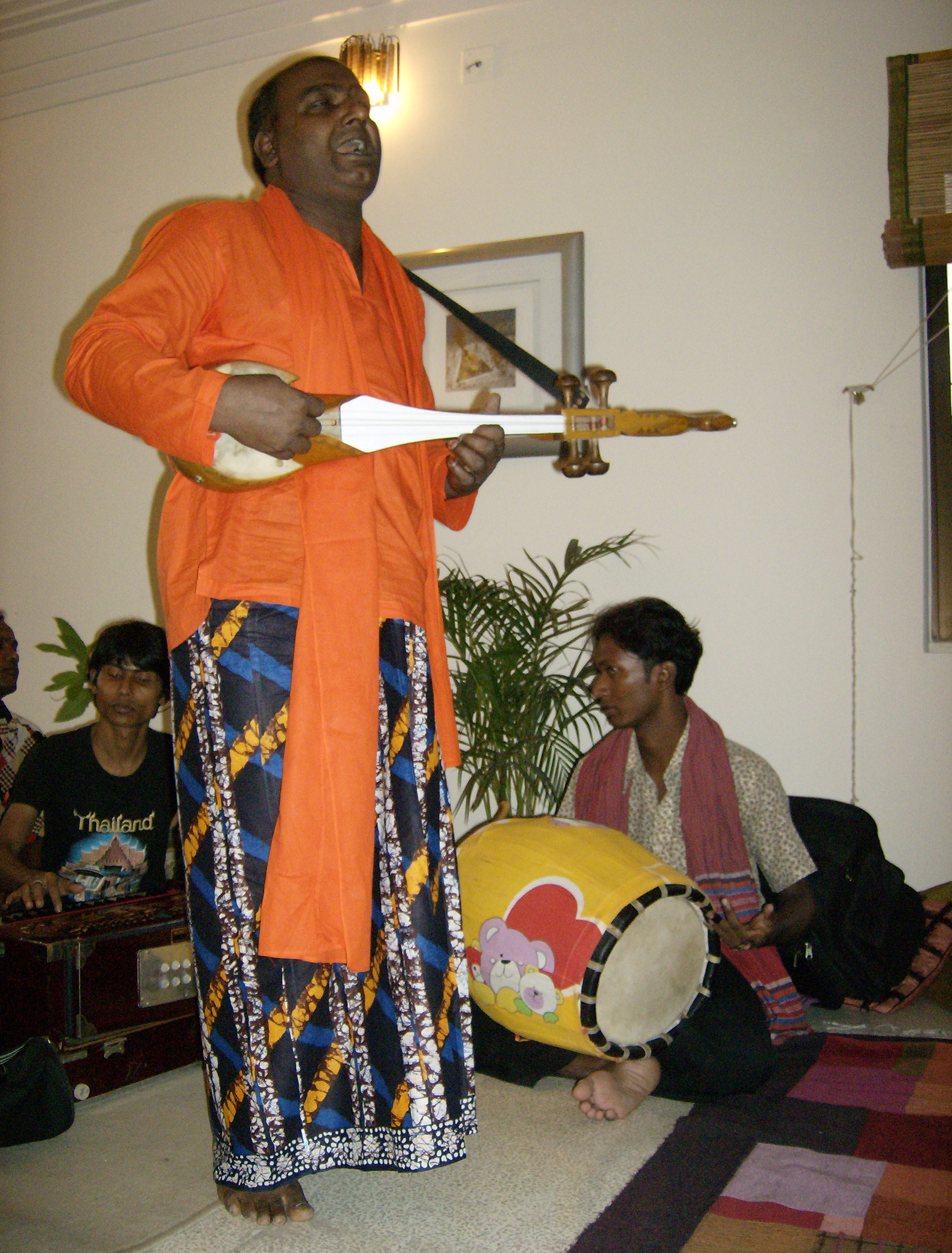
Bangladesh, Bengal, and Assam. Dotara

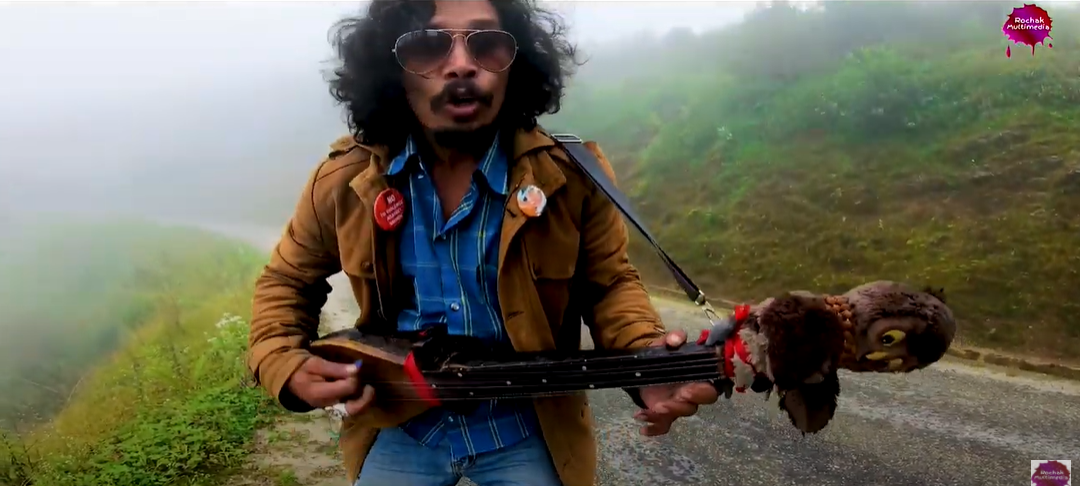
Nepal, arbajo

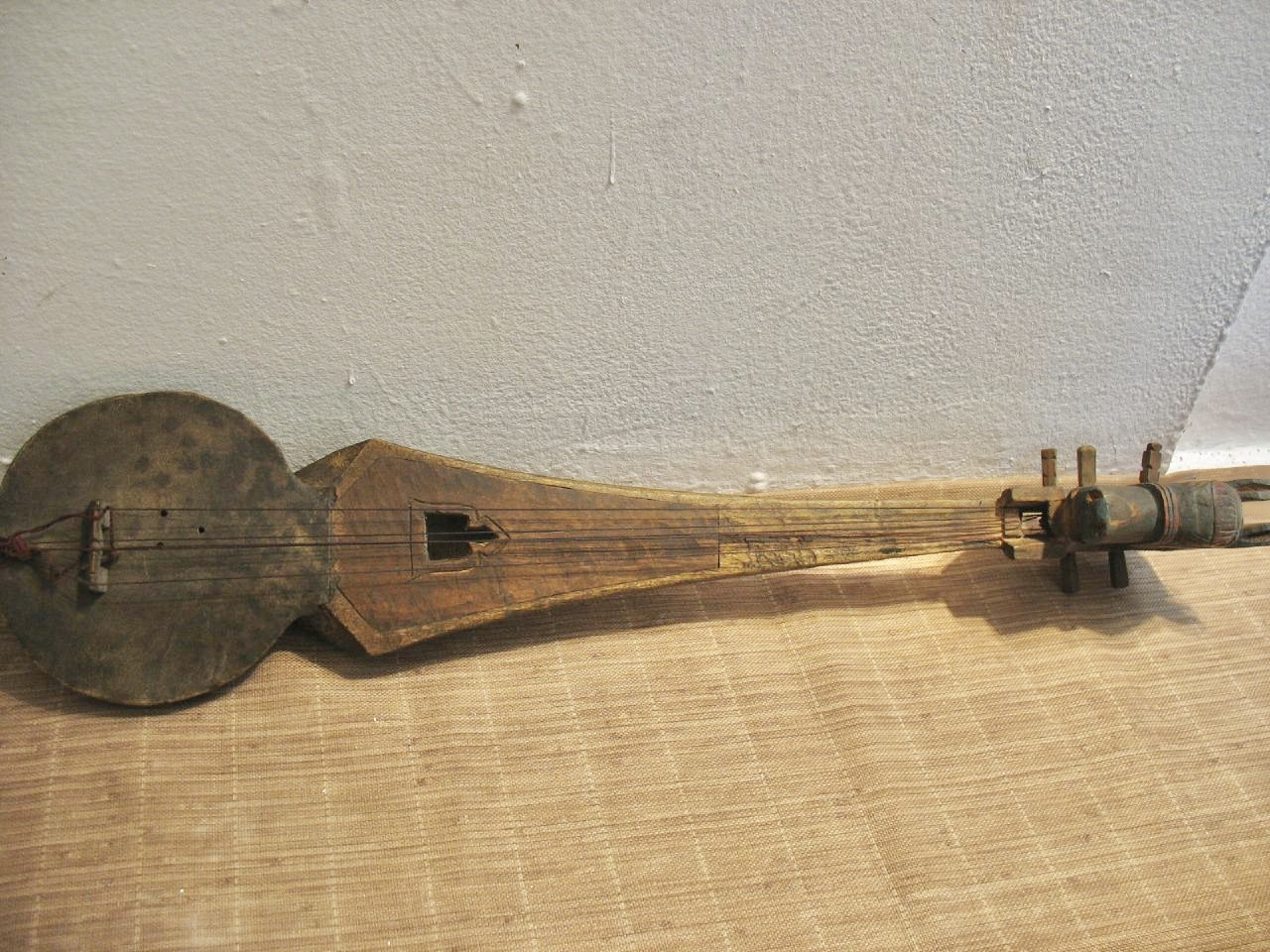
Nepali tungana

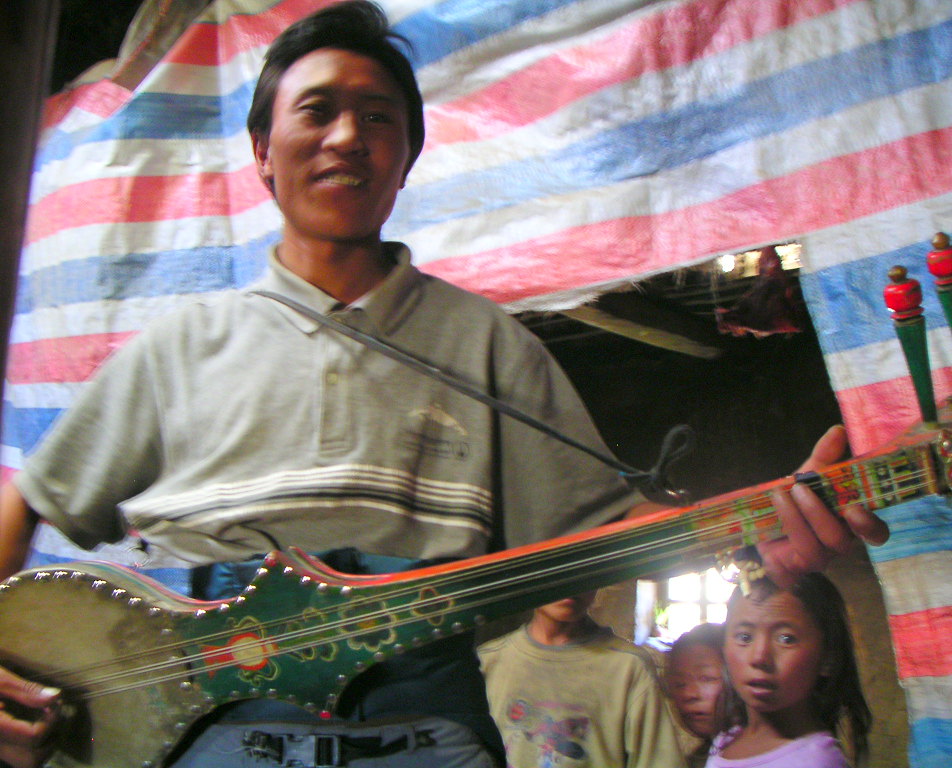
Dramyin or dranyen, 2005, Tibet

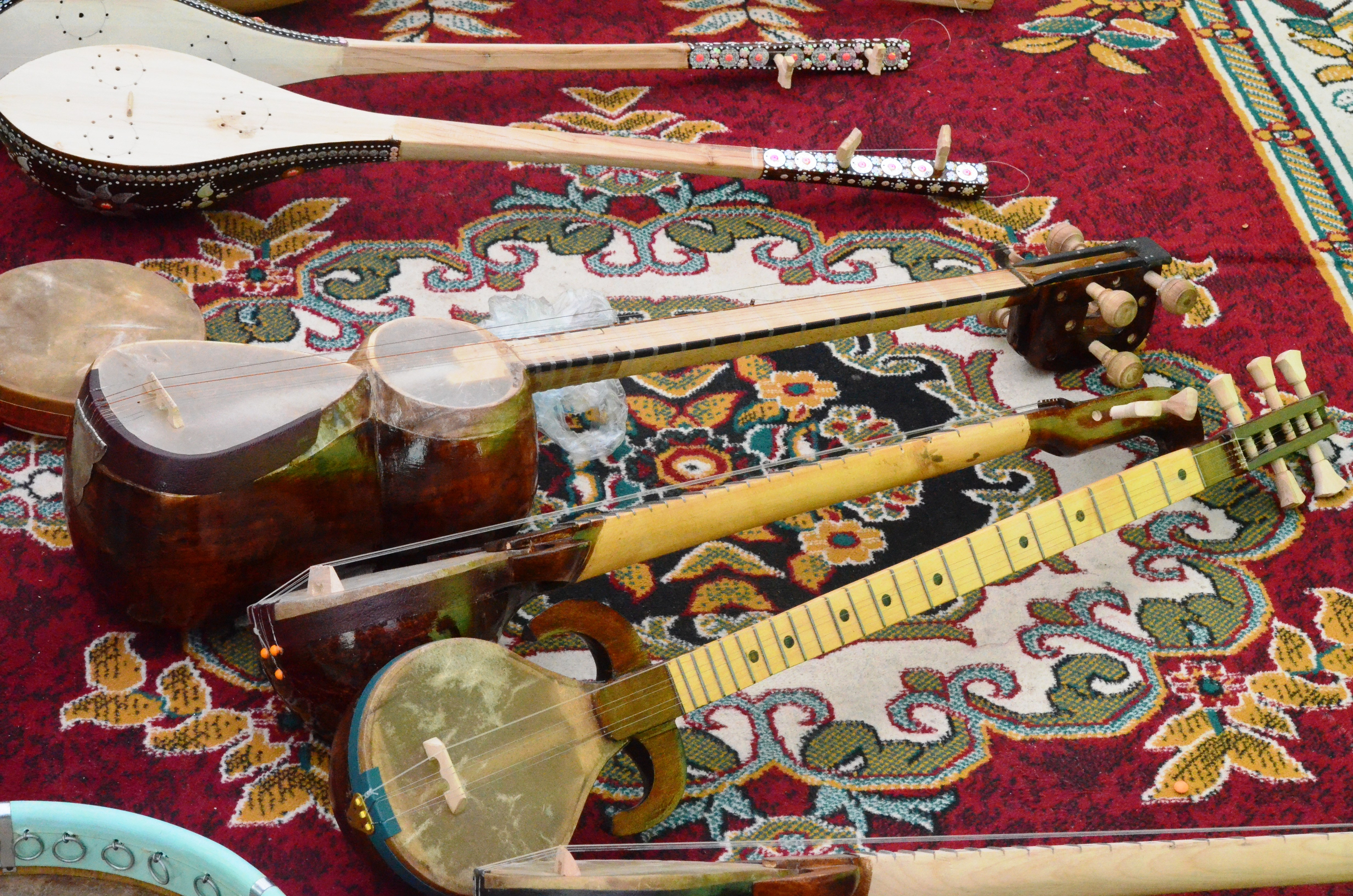
Bottom Tajik rubab (or rawap), middle tar, top dutar. The sound chamber on the rawap does not extend beyond the round bowl.

==== Gallery: spike fiddles, bowed rabâbs, kamanchas, liras ====
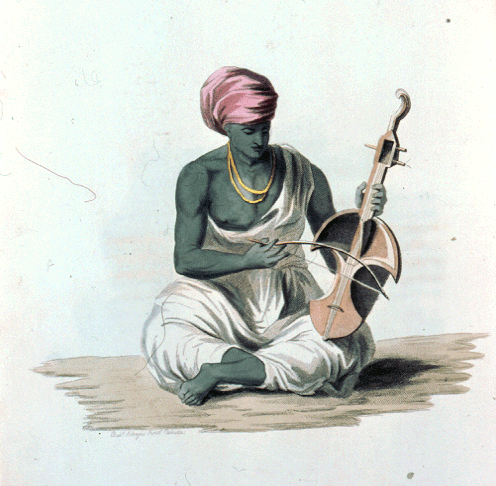
India, sarinda. Double chambered like Afghan rubab.

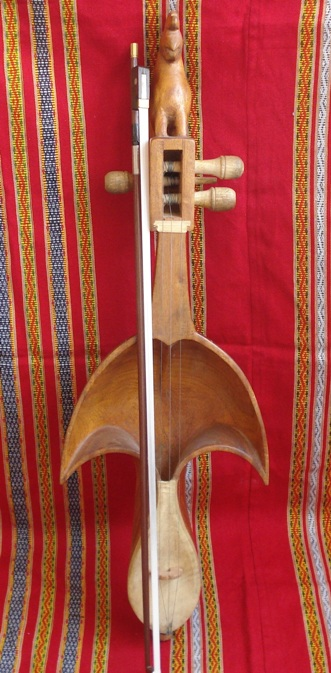
Eastern India. Tribal fiddle instruments called "Dhodro Banam" used by Santal people.

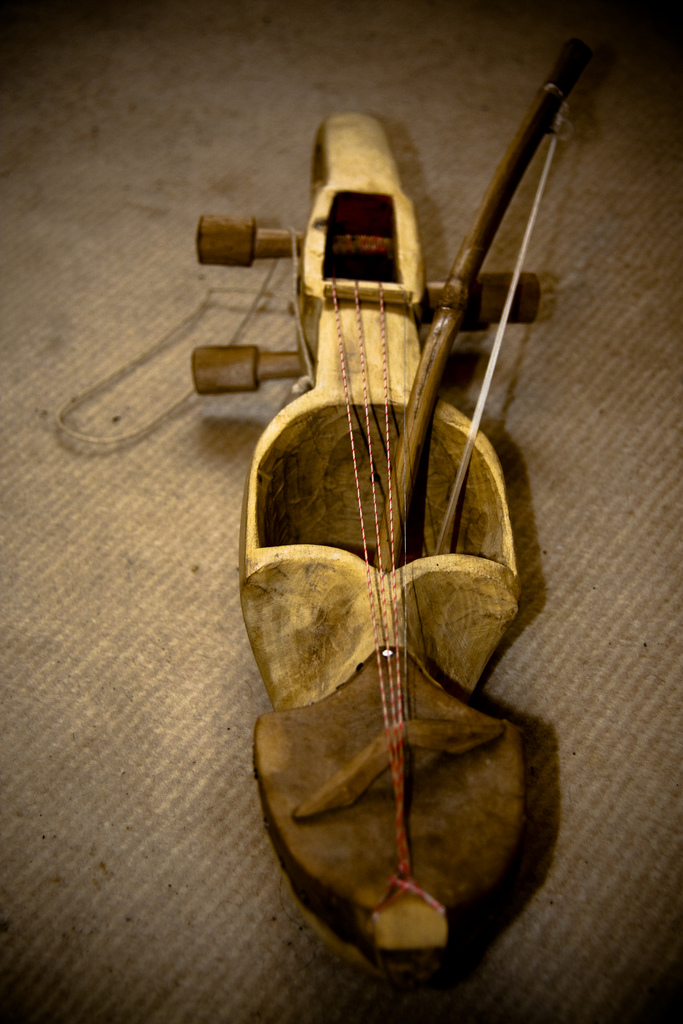
Nepal. Nepali sarangi

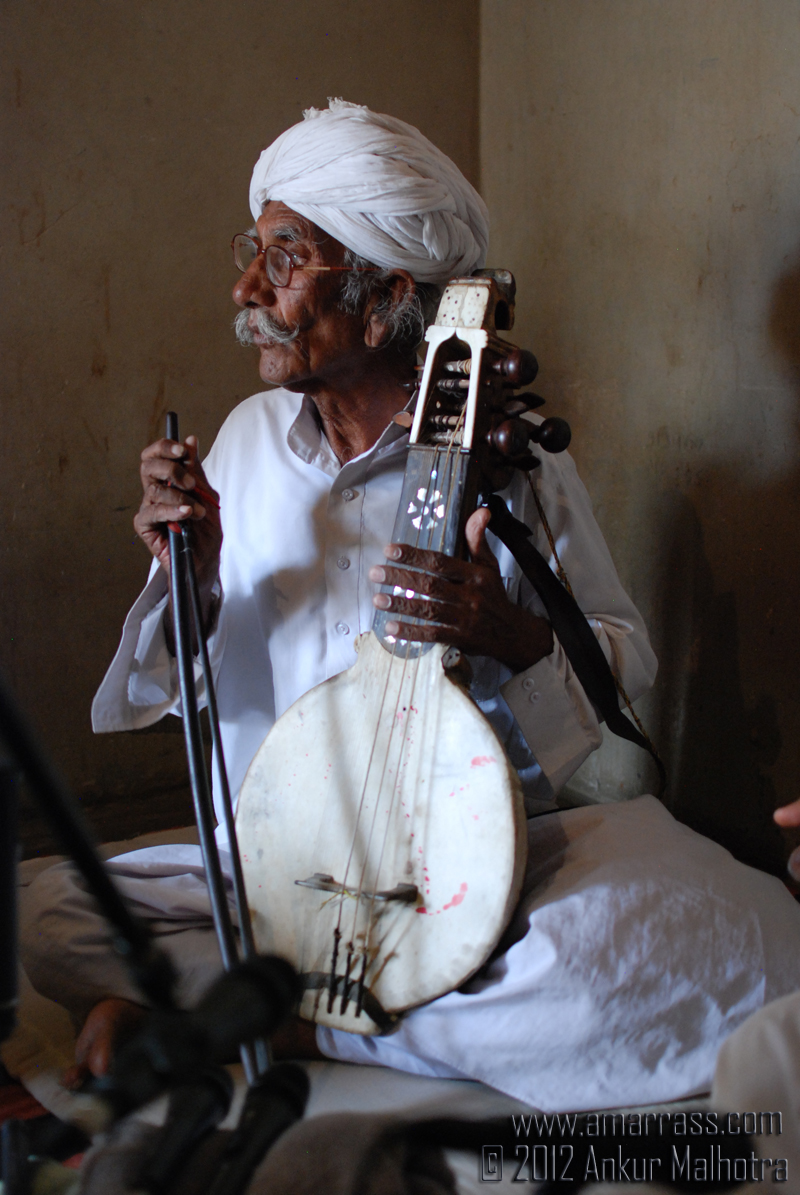
India. Kamsica, close relative to the plucked Seni rebab and sursingar

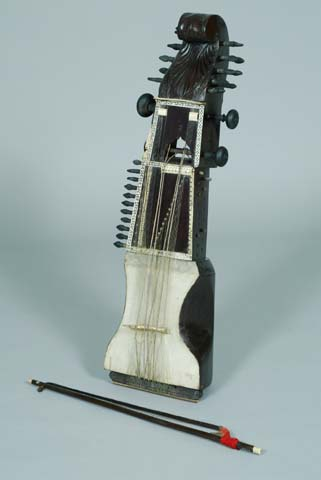
India, sarangi

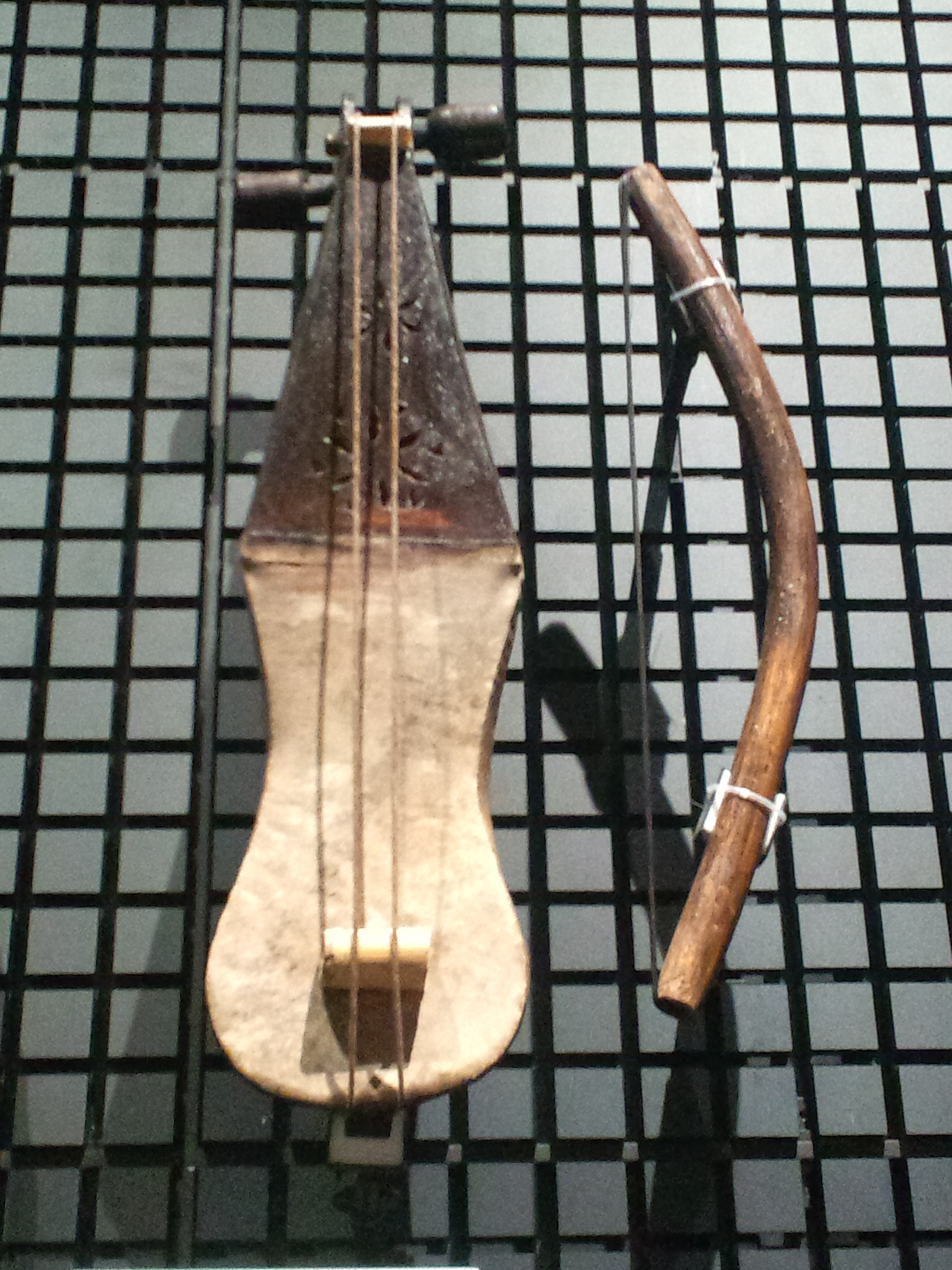
Morocco, 1991. Maghreb rebab or Rabab Andalusiyyah (Andalusian Rabab), brought to North Africa from The Iberian Peninsula after Reconquista

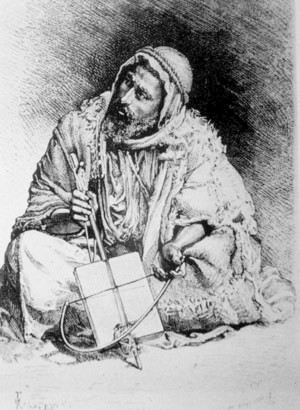
rabâb saharaoui, 1879

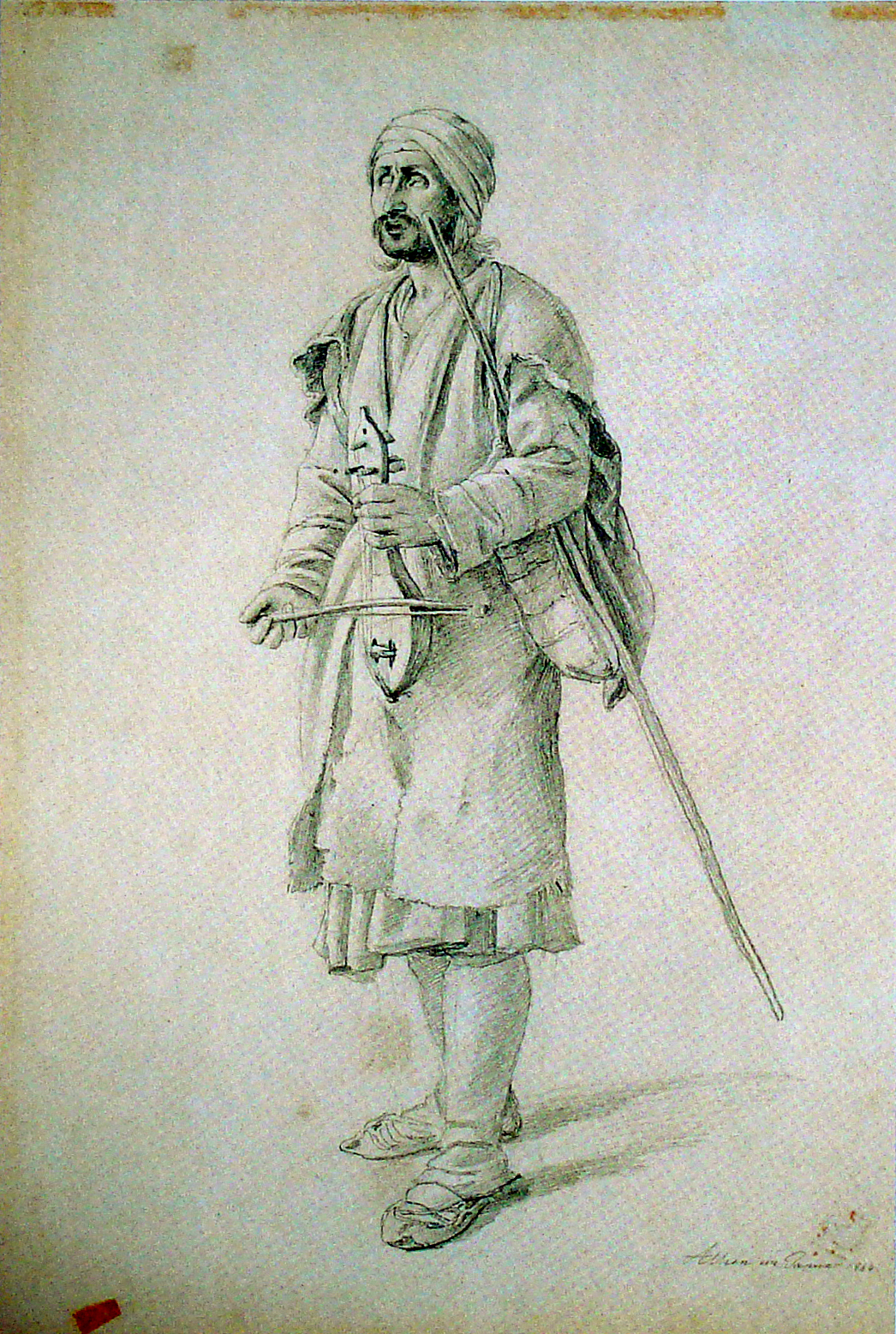
kemenche, 1844

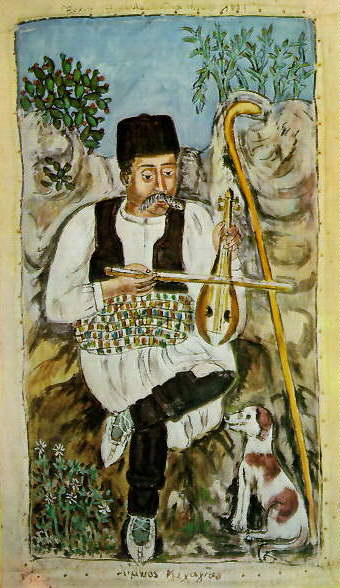
kemenche, Greece, late 19th or early 20th century

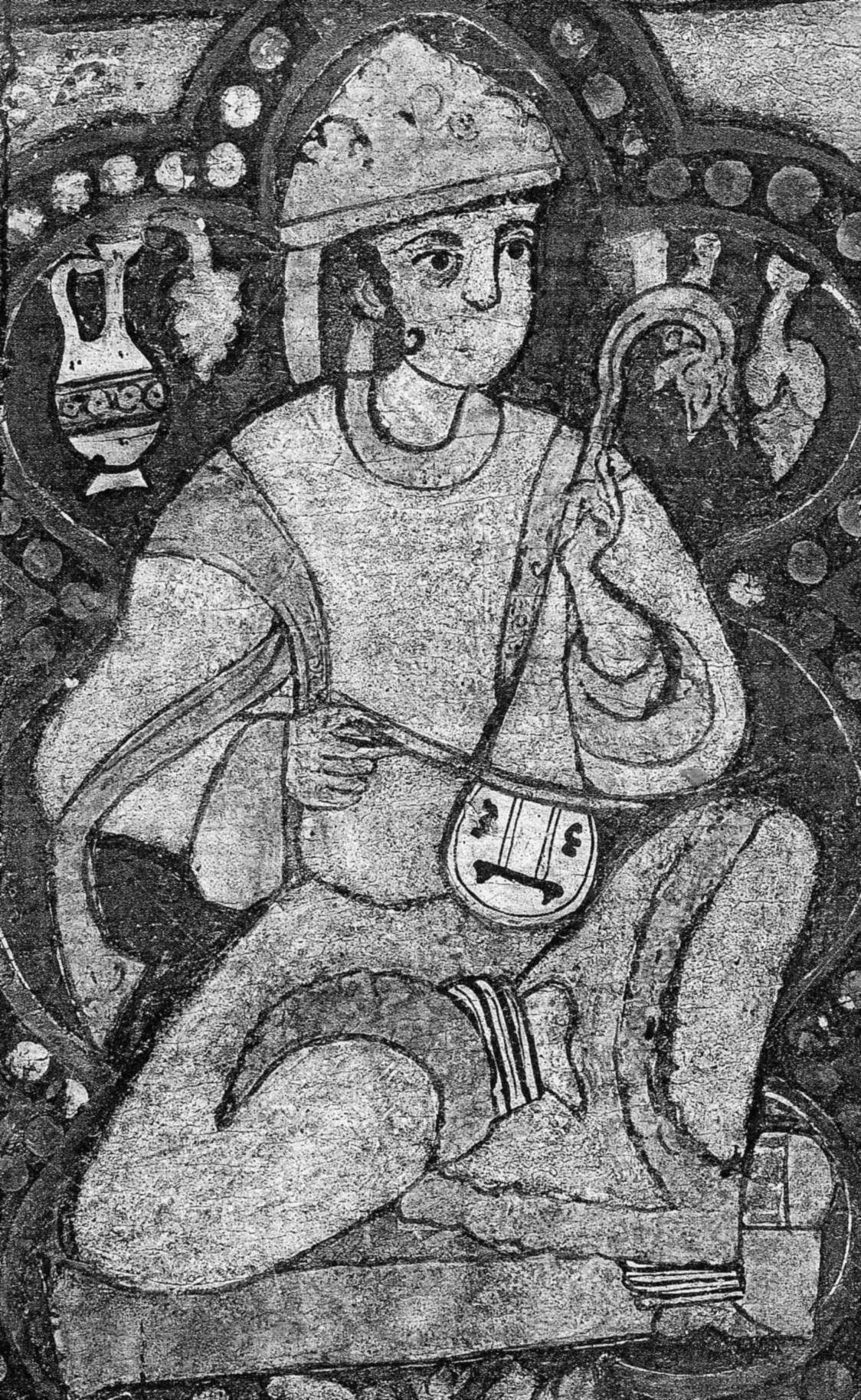
Rebab, Sicily, c. 1140 AD. Painting from the Cappella Palatina. Same sound holes found on Al Andalusia lutes

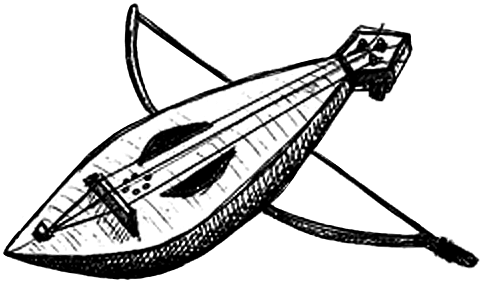
gudok, Russia

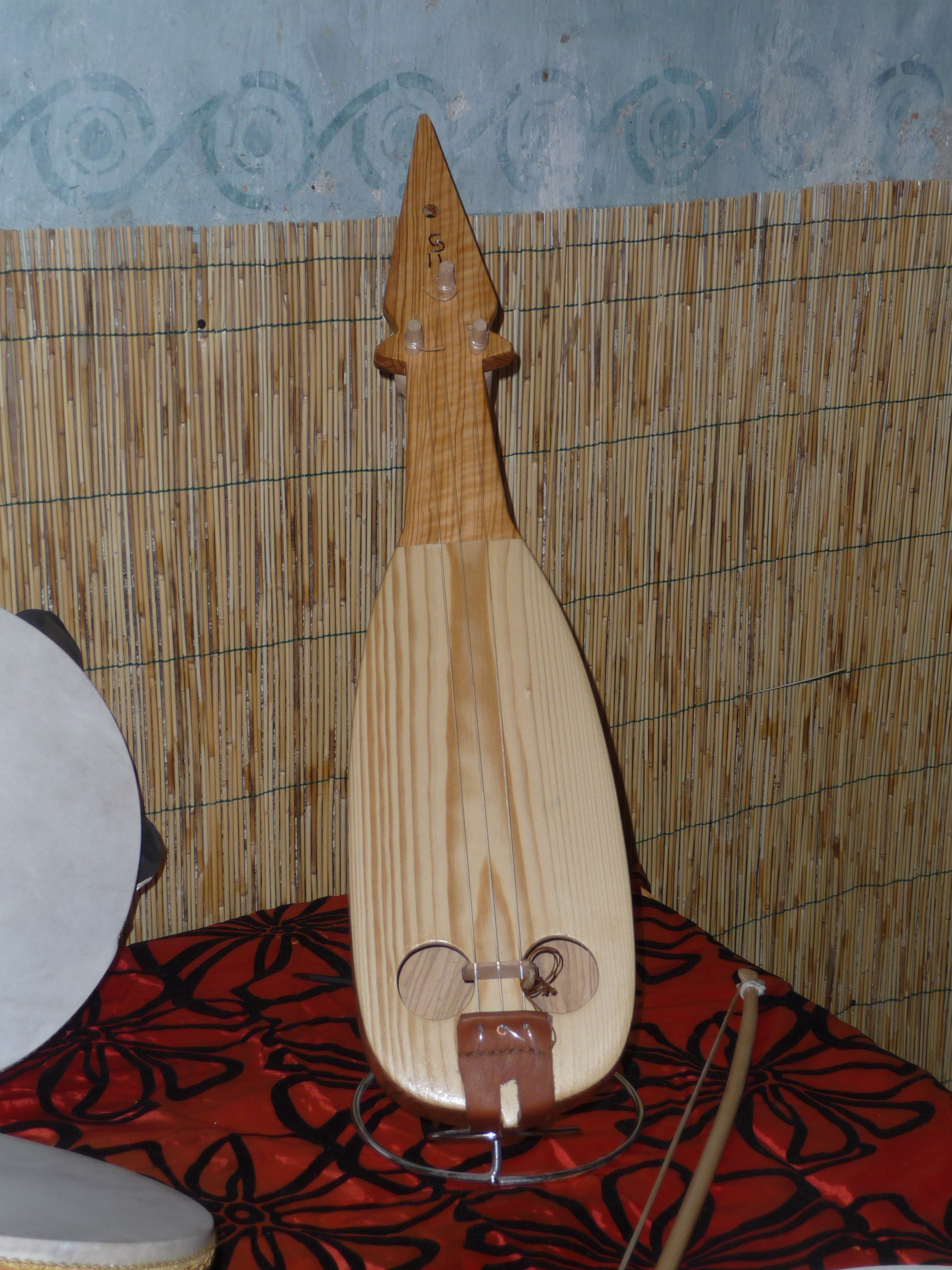
Calabrian lira

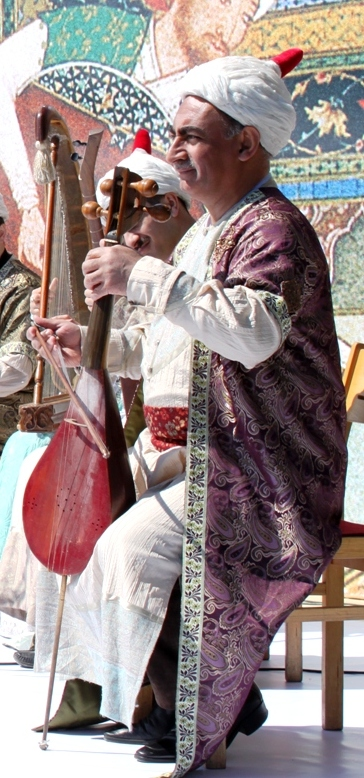
Azerbaijan, 3010. Chagane

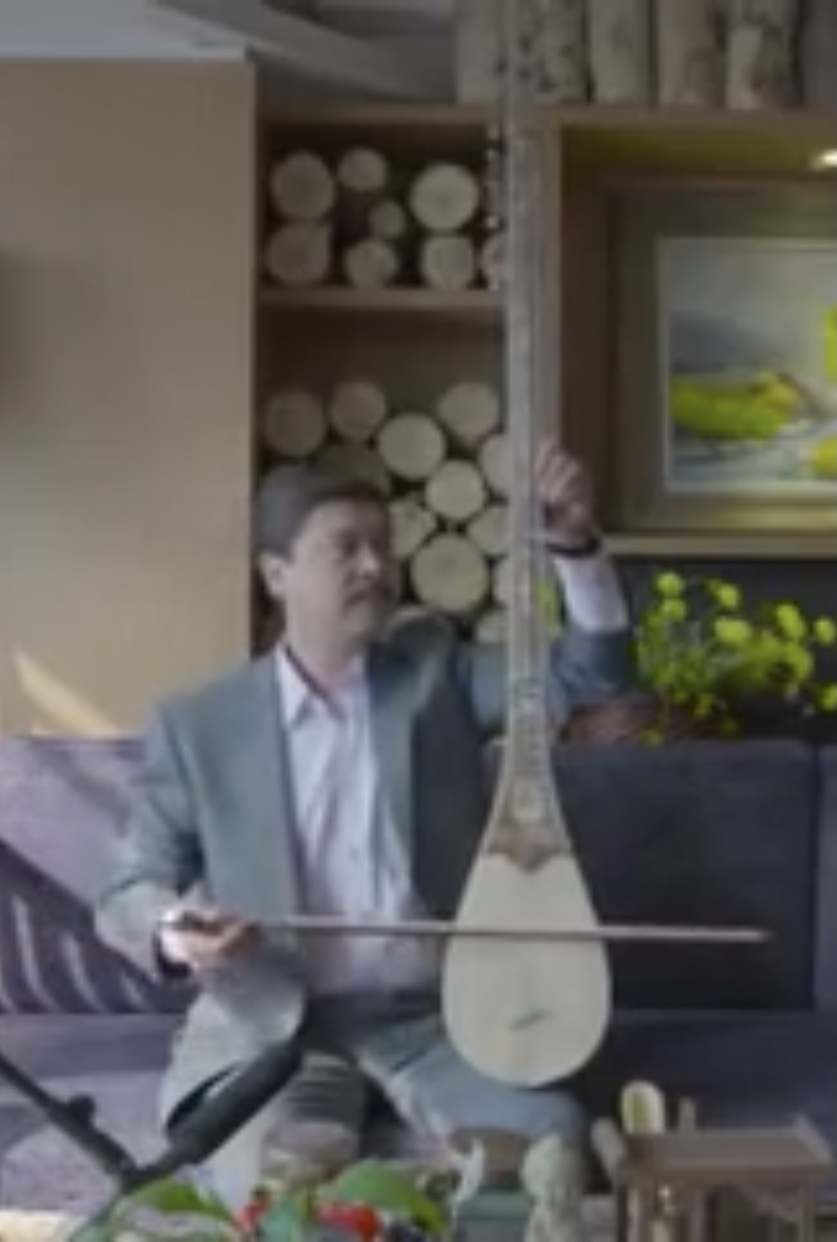
Uyghur man playing Satar, Xinjiang, China

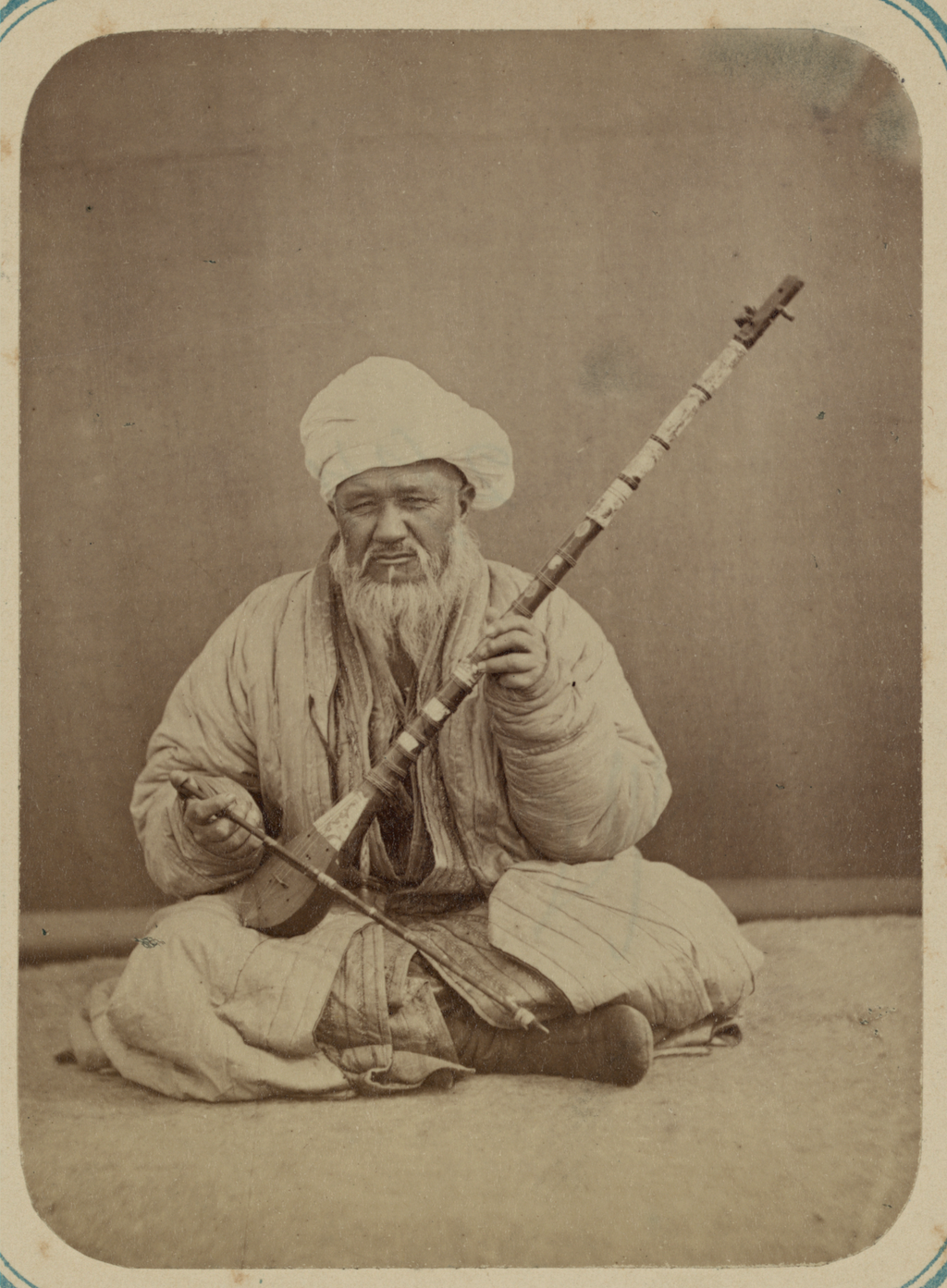
kamancha, a Long-necked Stringed Instrument, c. 1865–1872, Turkestan

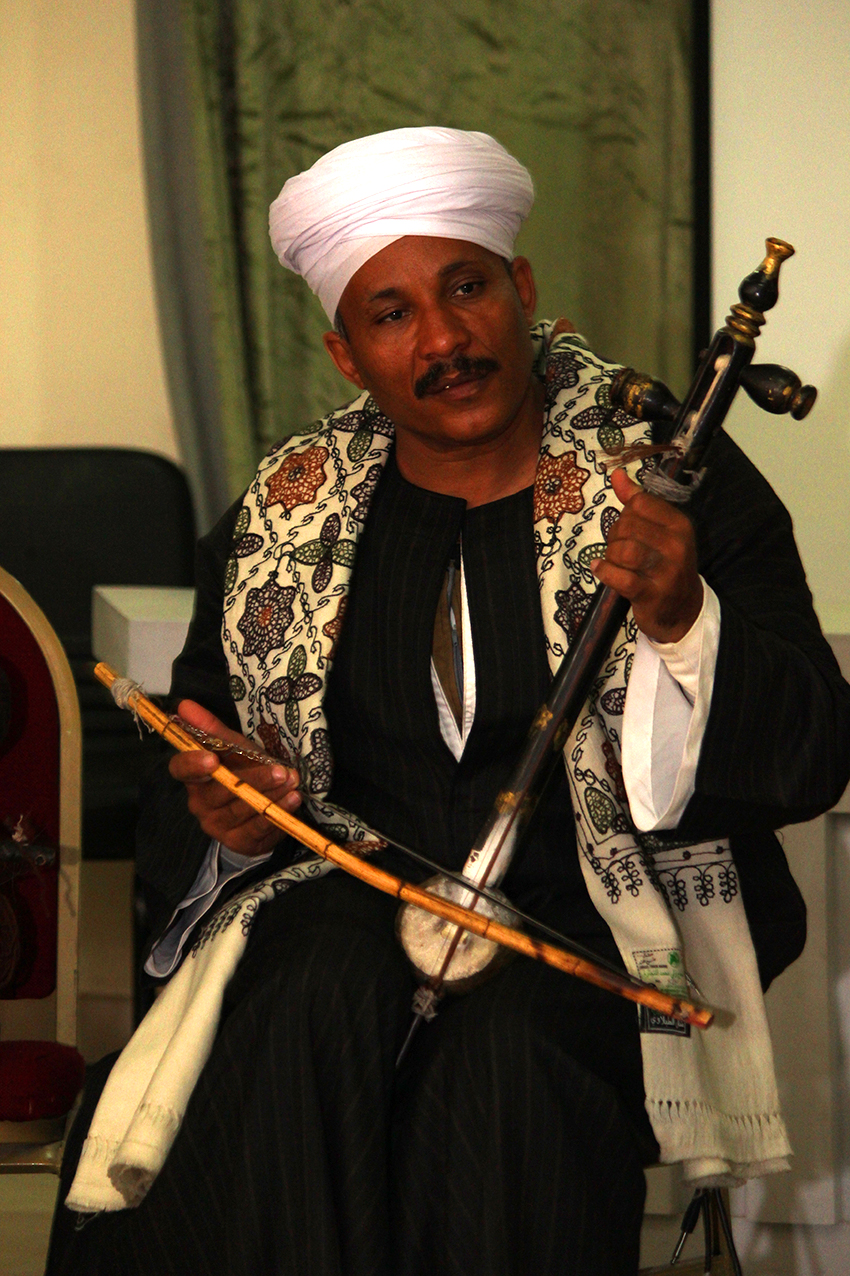
kamancheh, 2016, Egypt

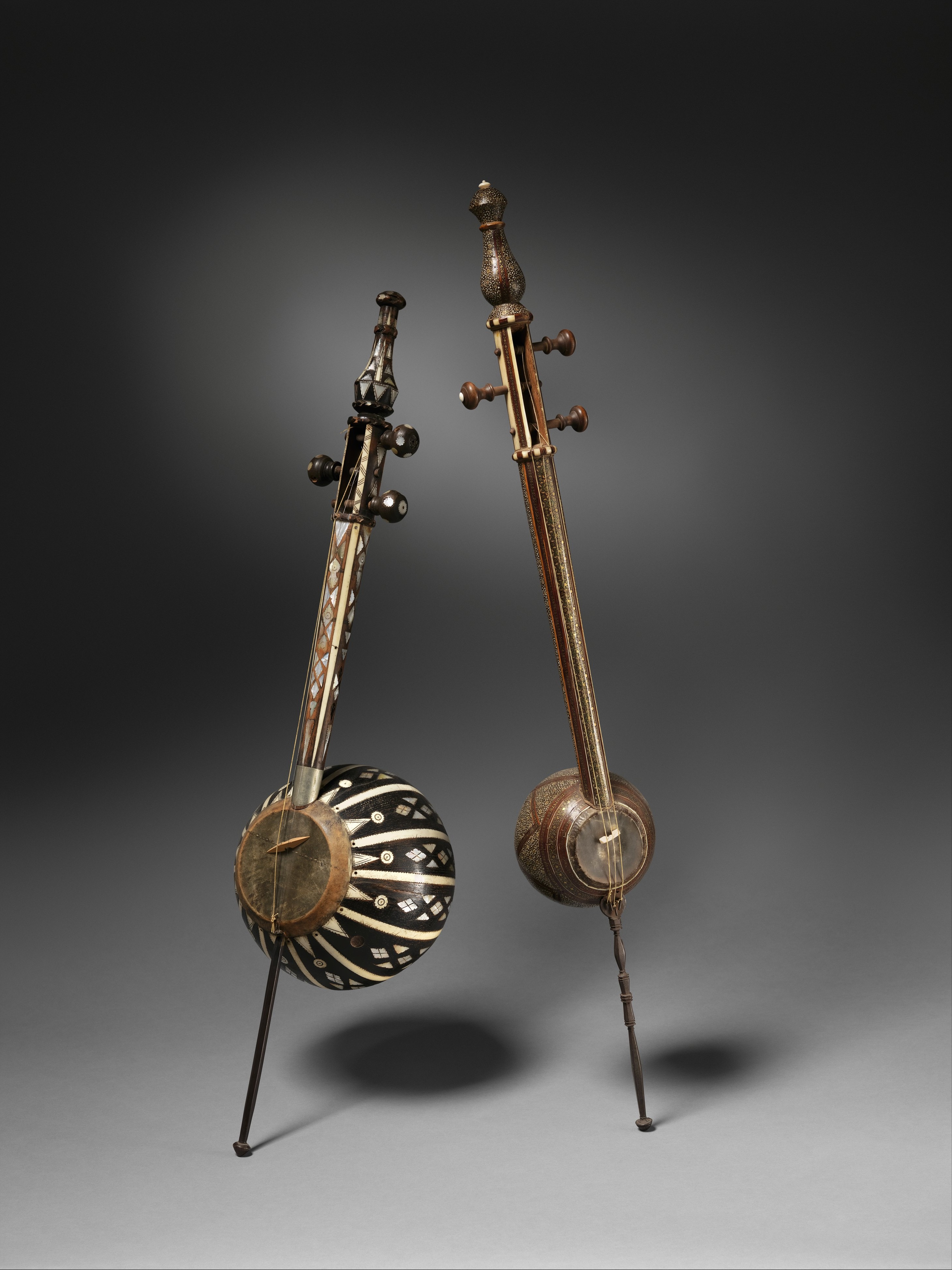
kamancheh, c. 1880s, Iran

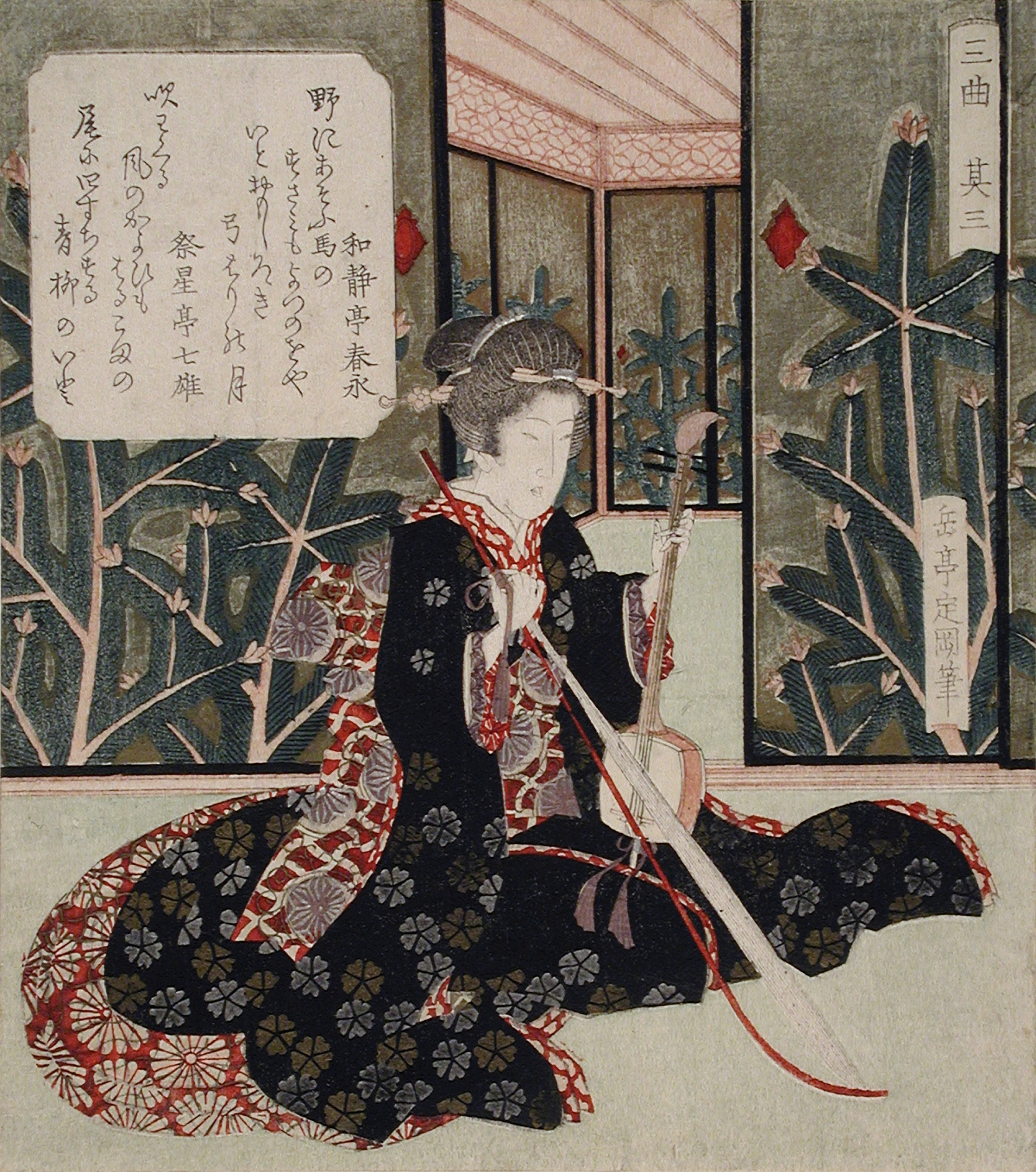
kokyū, Japan, 19th century

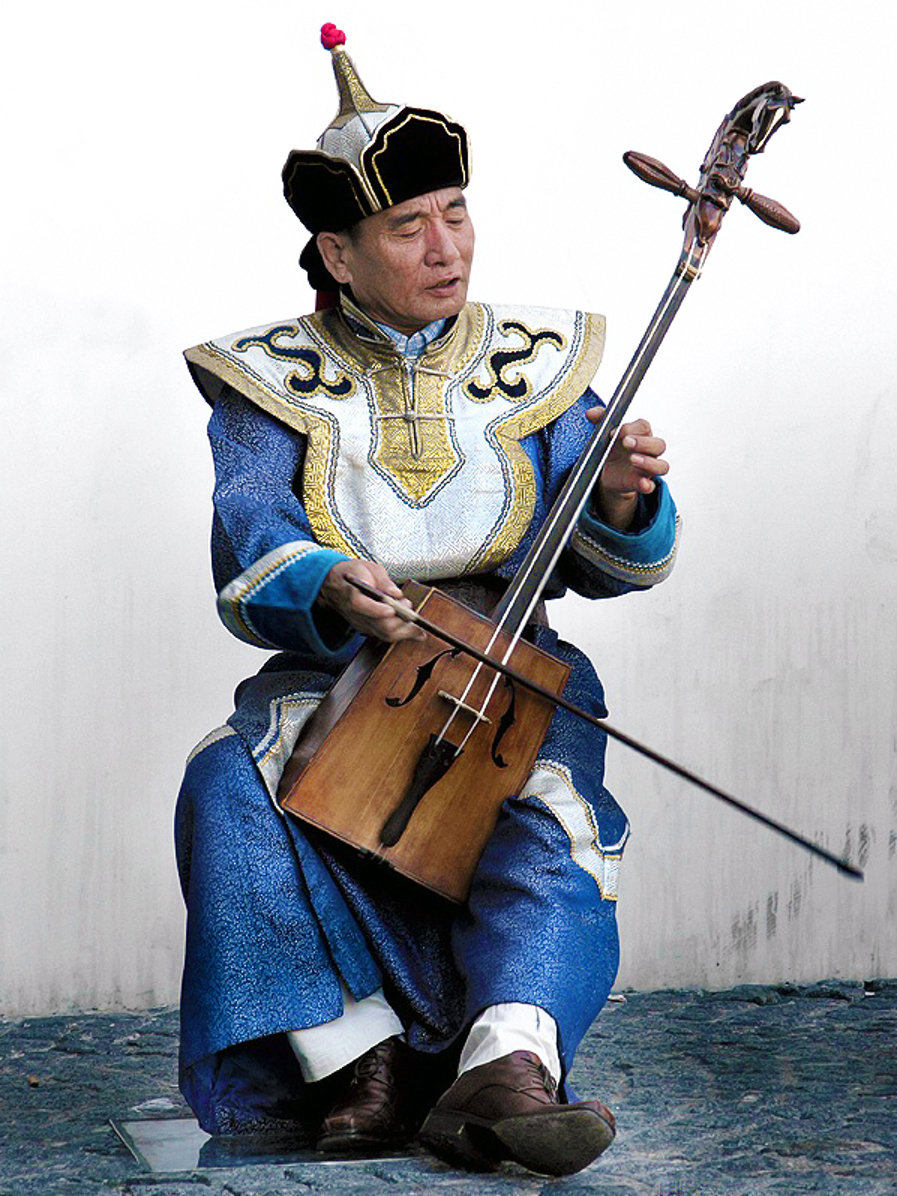
morin khuur, Mongolia 2005

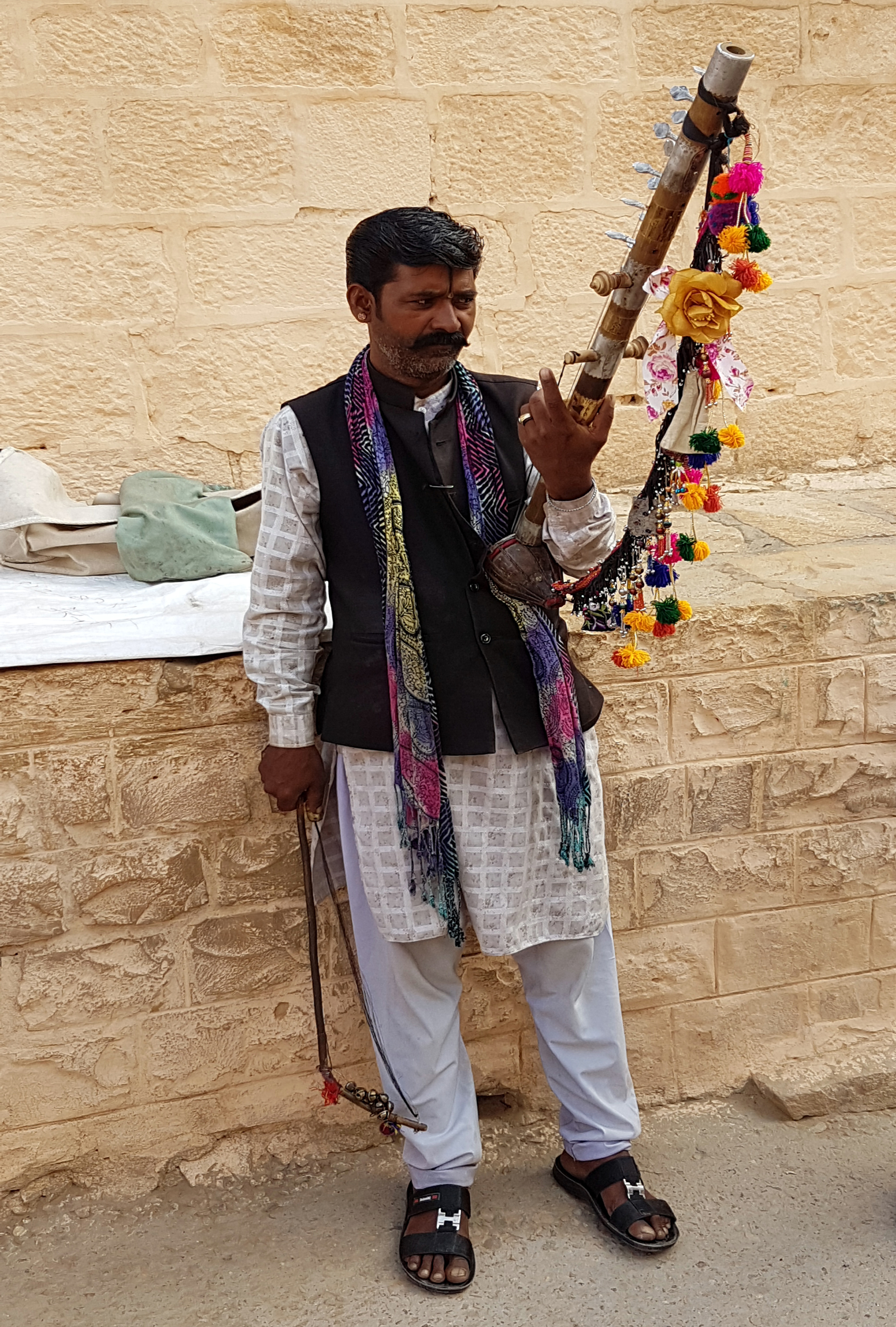
ravanahatha, 2017, India

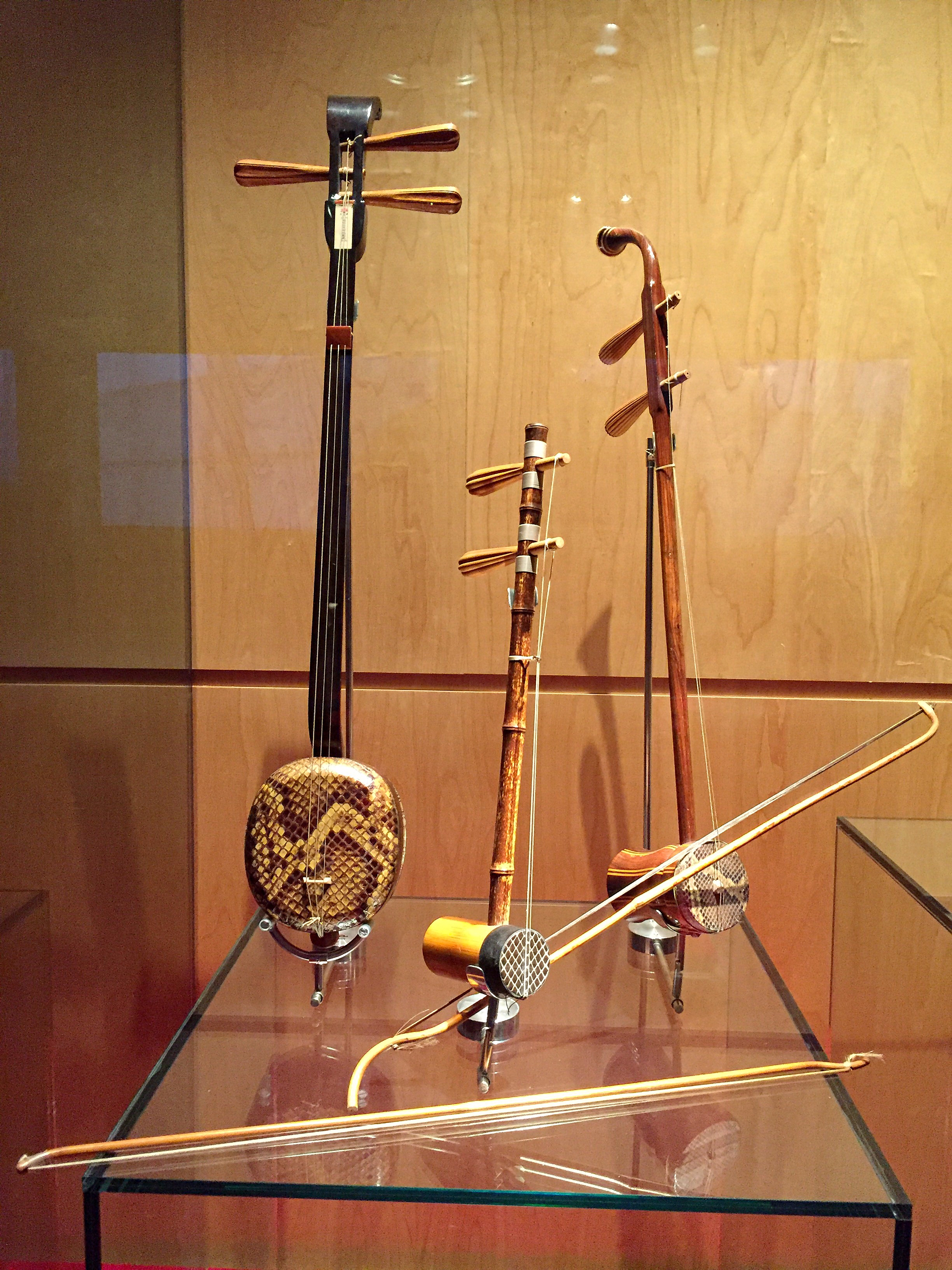
huqin-family instruments, China

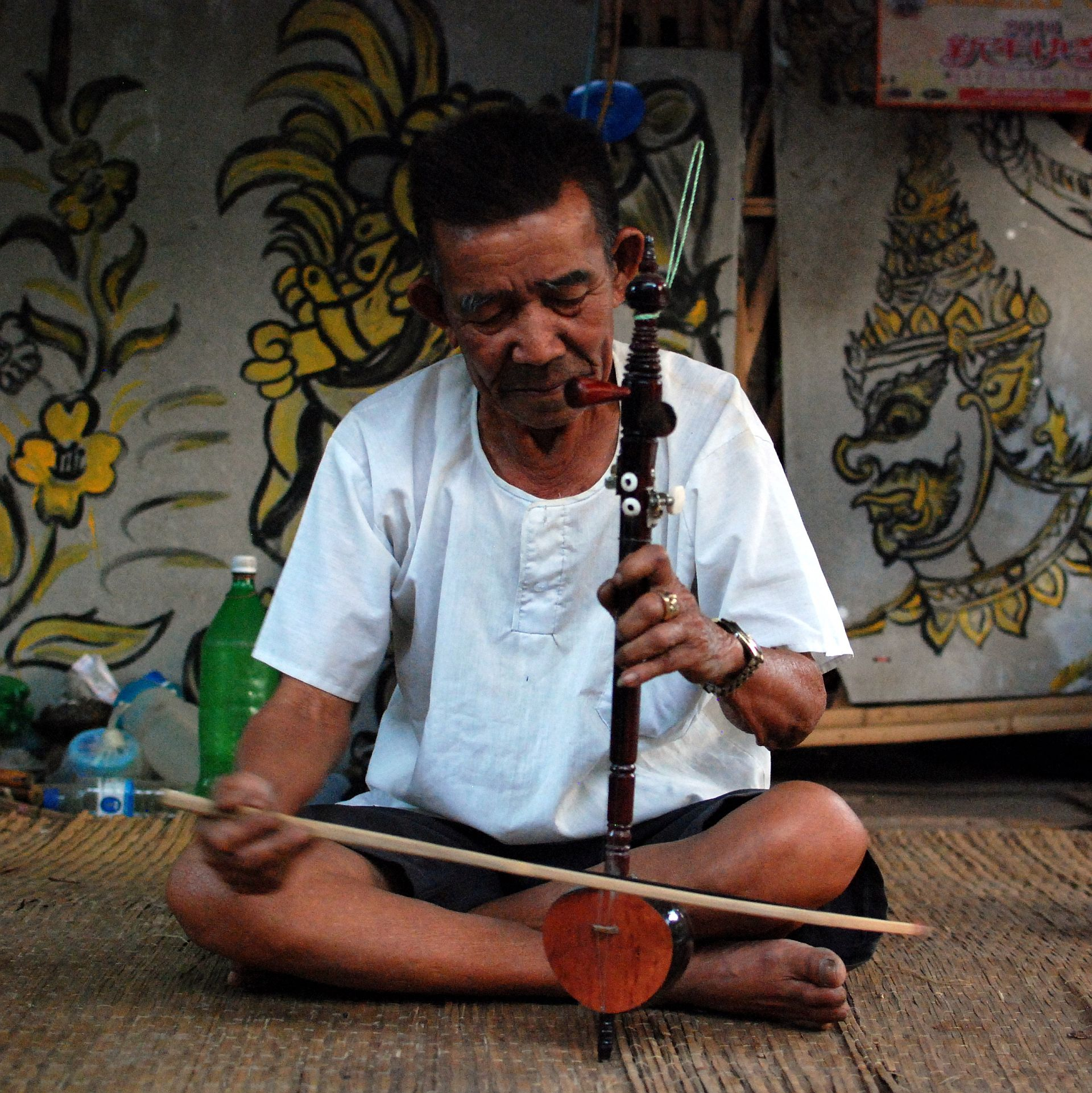
Thailand, coconut shell saw u ซออู้, the lowest pitch instrument in its family, which also includes the hardwood or ivory saw duang (ซอด้วง) and three-stringed Saw sam sai (ซอสามสาย).

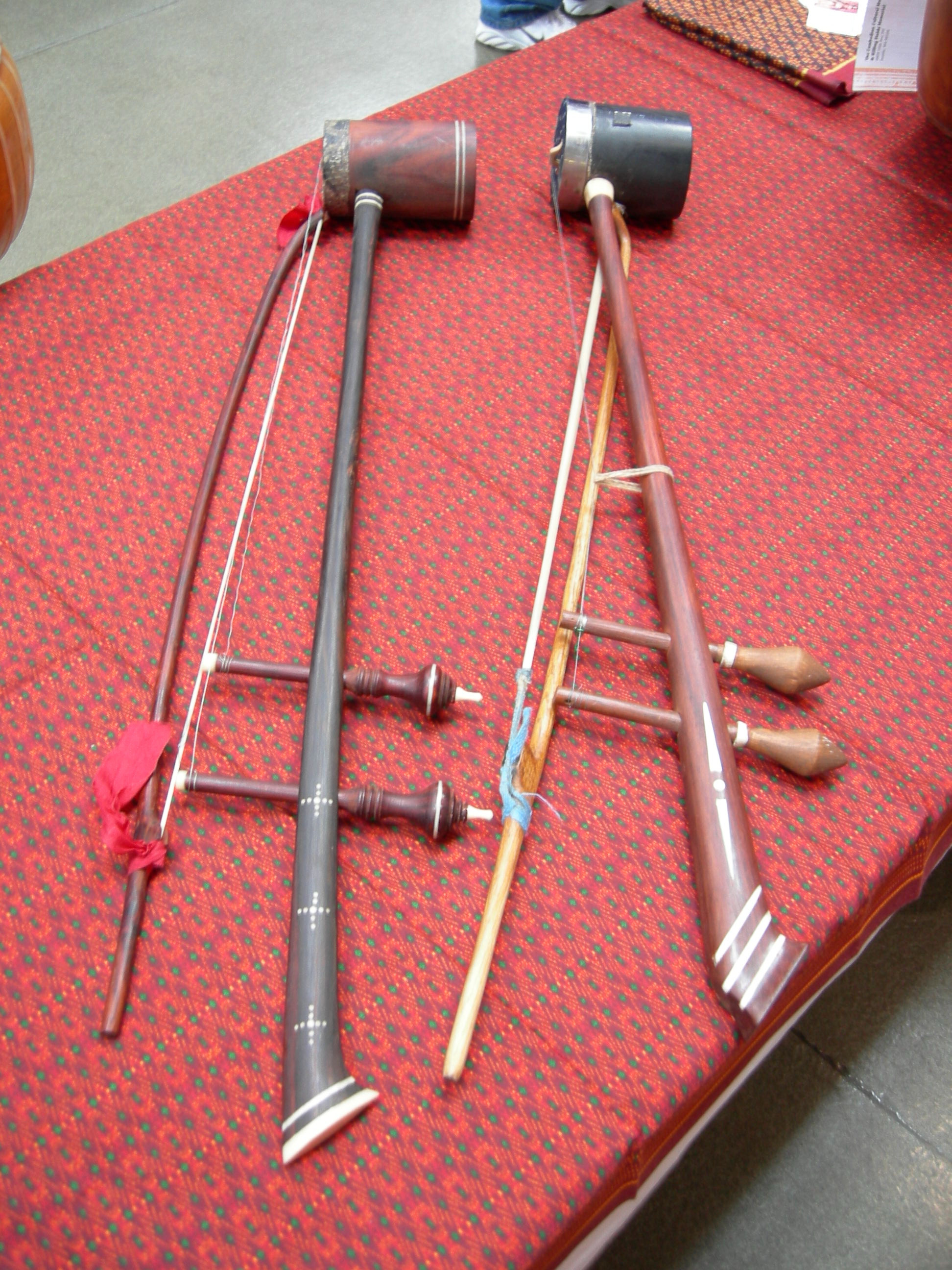
Cambodia, Tro (ទ្រ). This family of instruments includes coconut-shell tro u (ទ្រអ៊ូ), small hardwood tro sau toch (ទ្រសោតូច), bigger hardwood tro sau thom (ទ្រសោធំ), and the tro che. Also a three-stringed tro Khmer (ទ្រខ្មែរ).

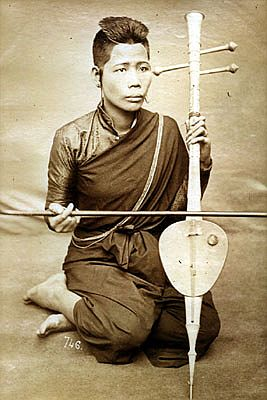
Cambodia, c. 1880, tro Khmer (ទ្រខ្មែរ)

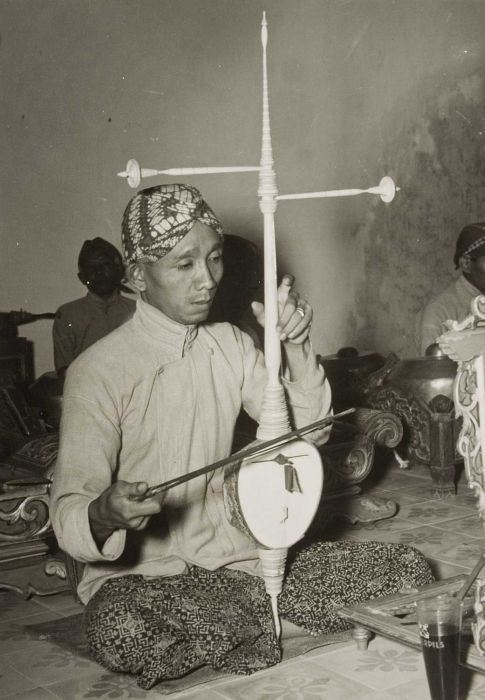
Indonesia, Rebab. Some of the Indonesian rebabs have the same shaped-coconut that the Cambodian and Thai instruments use. Others have ordinary round coconuts.

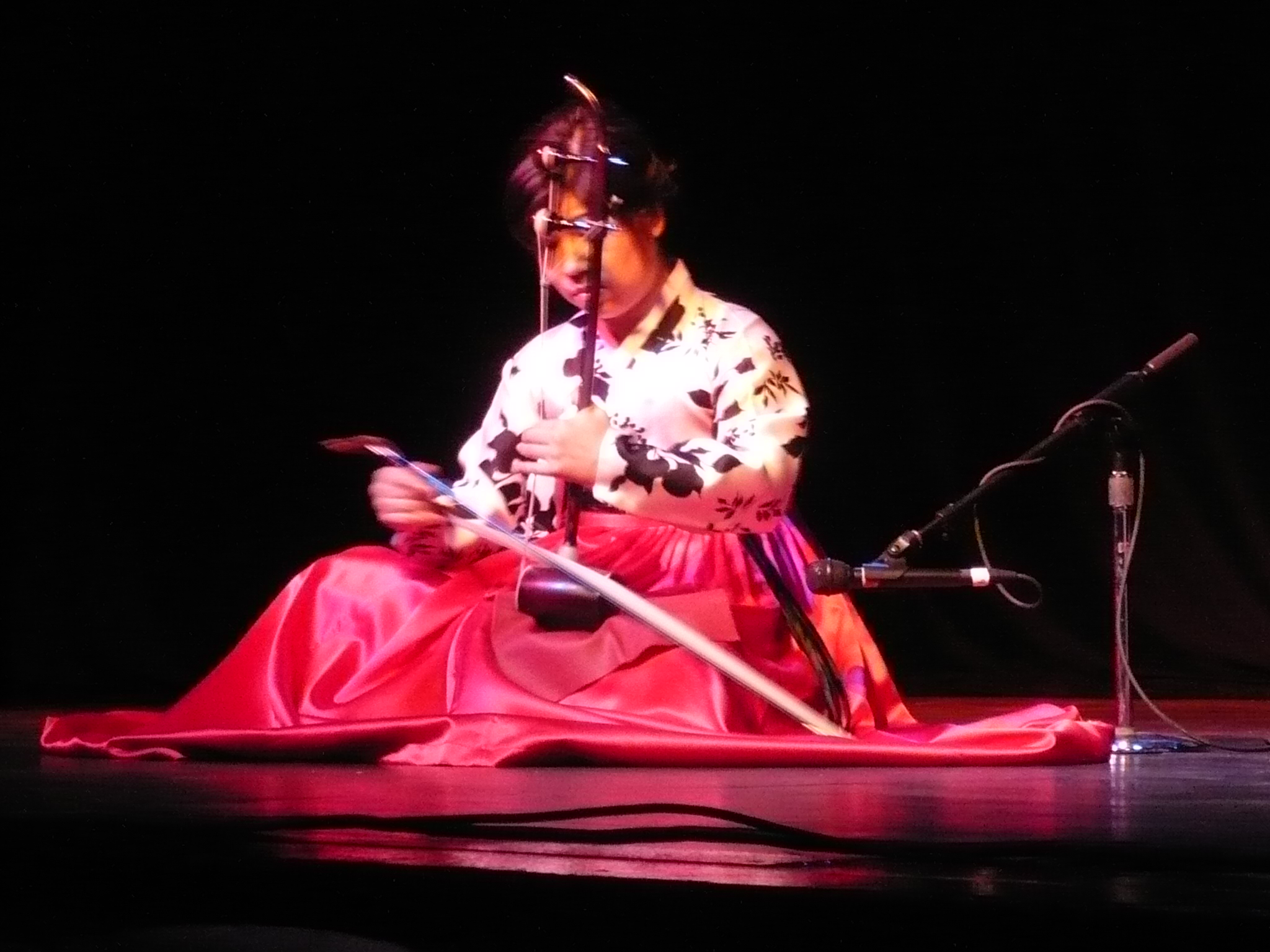
Korea, haegeum 2 strings

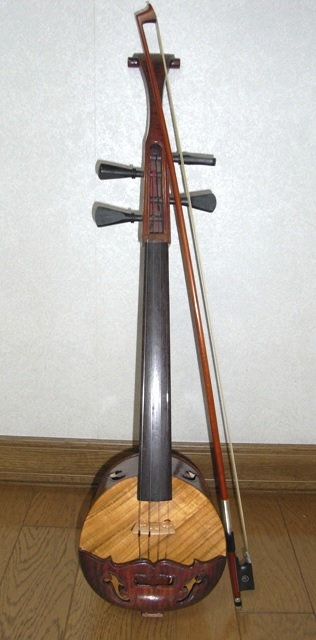
North Korea, sohaegeum, 4 strings

=== India and Southeast Asia ===
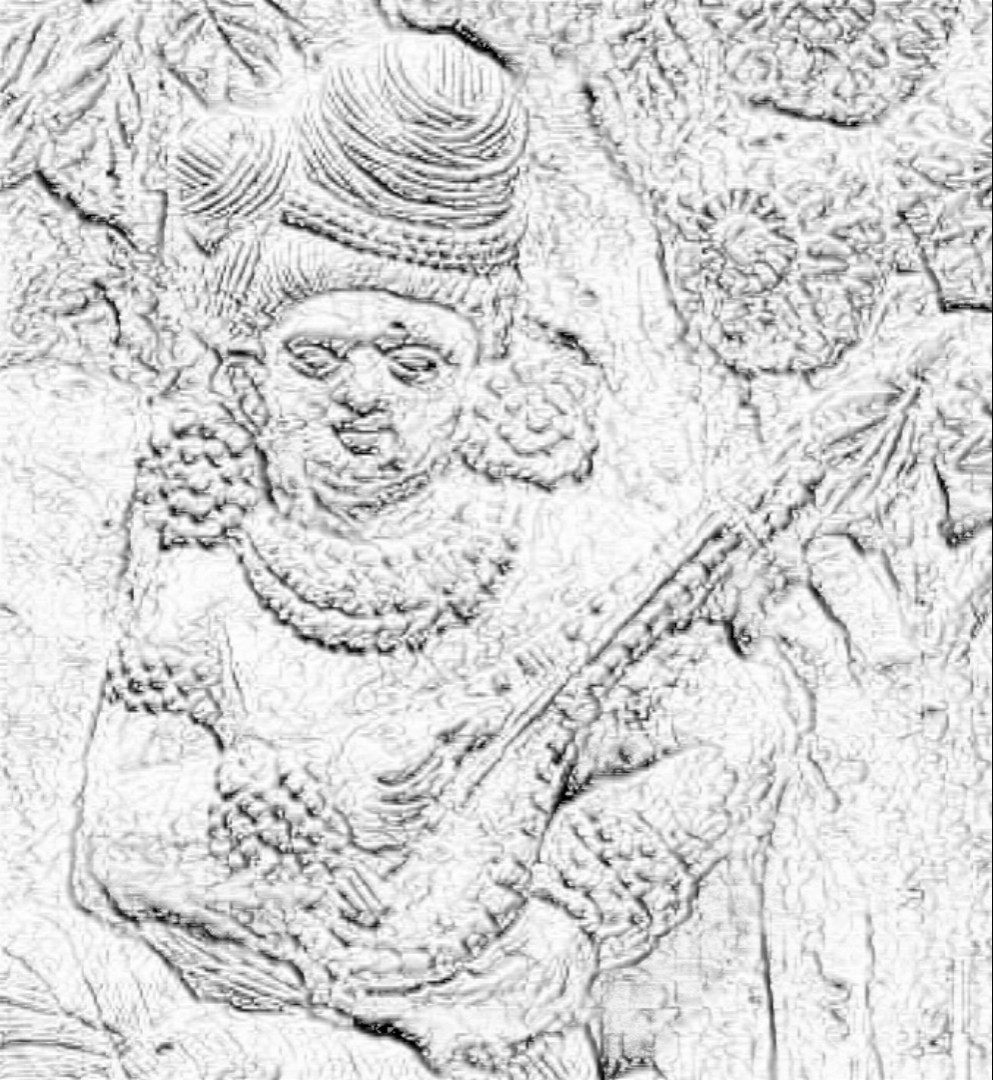
Indian short-necked lute 2nd-1st century B.C., Shunga period, Chandraketugarh. The original sculpture appears to have 3 strings.

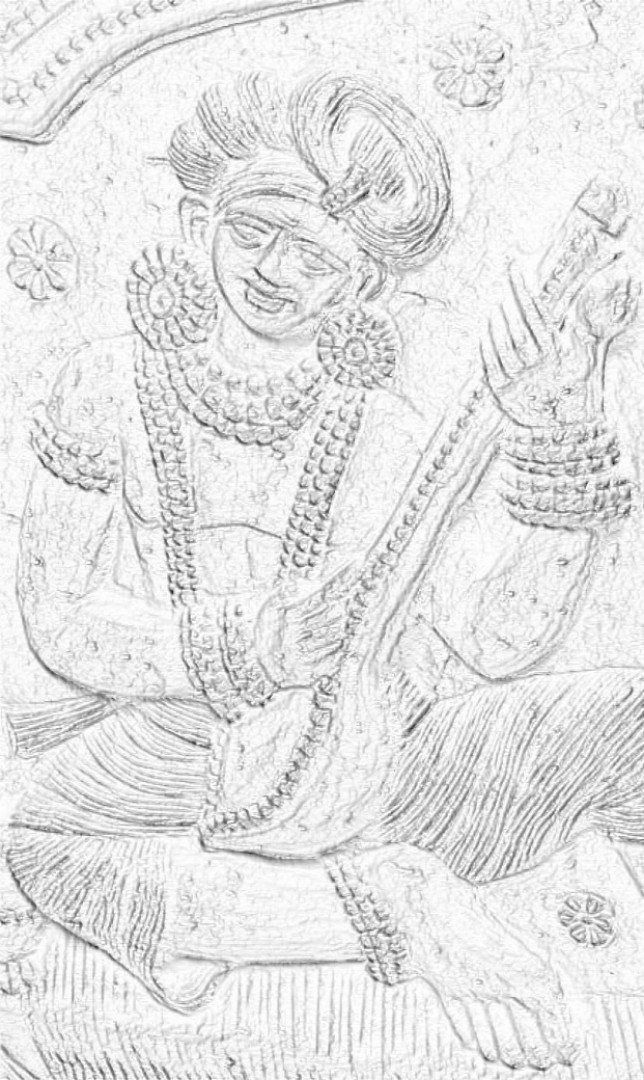
Indian long-necked lute, Bengal, Shunga period, 2nd century B.C.

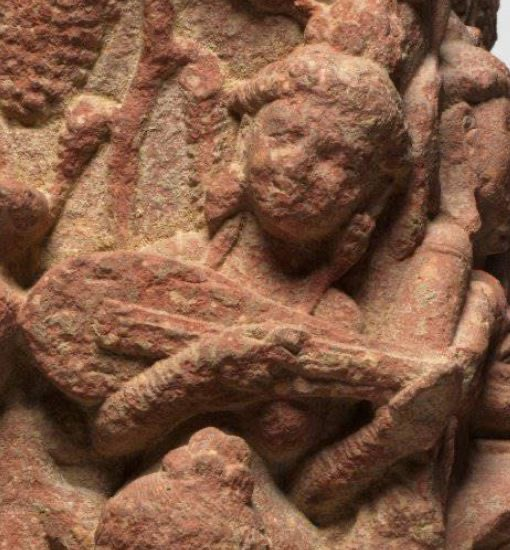
Lute or veena player, northern India, (Mathura during Kushan Period), 1st century A.D.

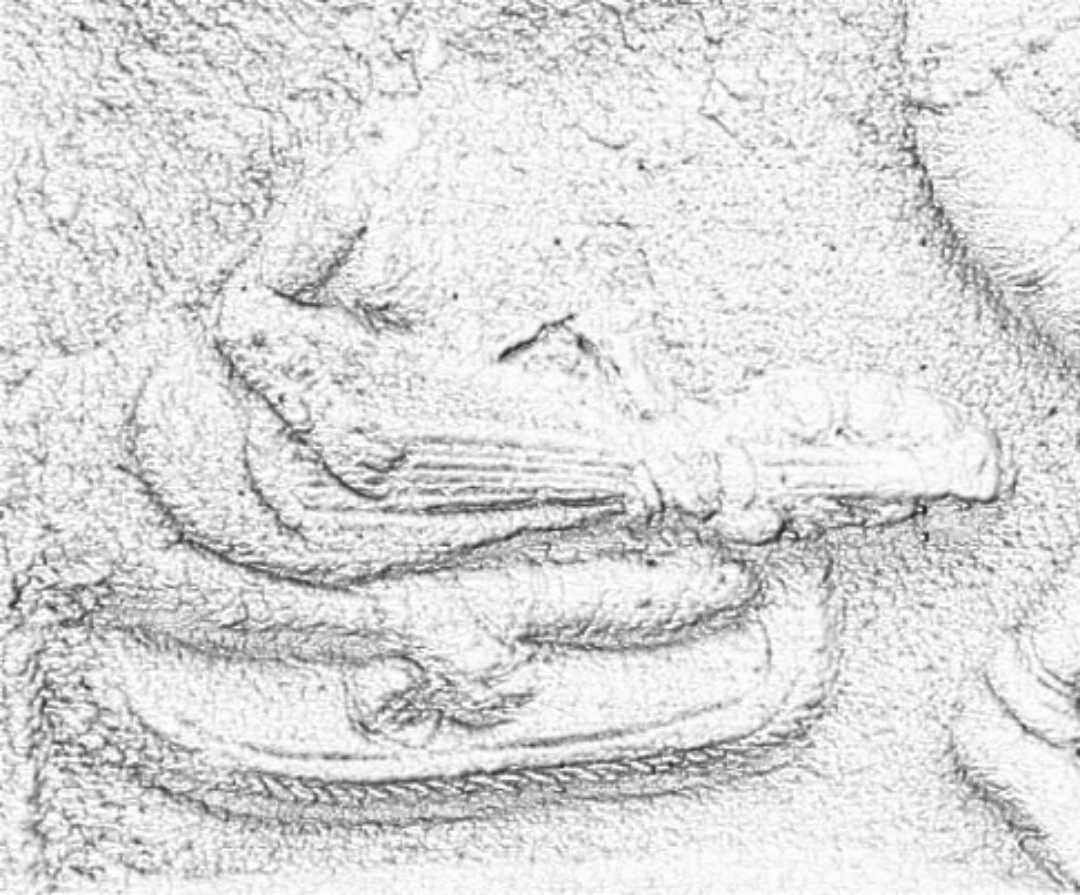
Lute from the Pawaya, 4th-5th century AD

Among modern lutes in India are the sitar, tanpura and Saraswati veena.

The sitar is currently believed to have developed from tanburs during Muslim rule in the north, after 1192 AD The Saraswati veena was developed in about 1600-1634 during the reign of Raghunatha Nayak. It was developed from the "barbed rabab" of the Moghul courts, with the tuning, frets, upper resonator, string and running coming from the native stick-zither instruments such as the kinnari vina.

However, this is not to say India was unfamiliar with lutes earlier in its history. Images of Indian lutes exist, both short necked and long necked instruments as far back as the Shunga Empire in the 2nd century B.C.

In the north of India a lute from the first century AD may be seen in a Mathuran sculpture. In the 1st–4th centuries AD., lutes traveled with Buddhists in Northern India along the Silk Road and can be seen in sculptures in Gandhara, where Buddhism mixed with Hellenism.

In the south of India, images at the Ajanta Caves (450–490 A.D.) and Pawaya (4th–5th century A.D.) also show the instruments in years approaching the medieval period. Sculptures by Buddhist and Hindu cultures at Champa (Cham culture), Ku Bua, Thailand (Dvaravati culture), and Borobudur, show Indian cultural influence and images of lutes dating to the 7th through the 9th century A.D.

==== Lutes in Hindu and Buddhist artwork ====
See: Ancient maritime history See: Veena

Southeast Asia consists of countries connected to the continent, such as Vietnam, Cambodia, Thailand, Burma, Laos, as well as island nations such as Indonesia and Malaysia and New Guinea. During the first millennium AD, Southeast Asia has had connections to India, Africa, China, Melanesia and the Arab Peninsula. Musical instruments can be grouped by geographic location, ethnicity or religion; all of these have had an effect on what instruments are used in a community.

Speaking of Southeast Asia, Curt Sachs said its history began "in the first centuries A.D. when it became an immense, though loosely knit, Indian colony. Hinduism and Buddhism spread throughout what are now Burma, Cambodia, Thailand, Vietnam, all the way to China."

Austronesians navigated an area from Easter Island to Madagascar, setting up the Maritime Silk Road though Southeast Asia. The Austronesians, who included the Javanese and Sumatrans, passed on the catamaran and outrigger boat to South India and Sri Lanka about 1000-600 BC and reached China c. 220-200 BC.

The waterways became international as ships from the Islands sailed all the way to India and Madagascar, and Indian ships sailed the other direction. Southeast Asia formed ties to India as early as the 4th century BC. About a millennium later, Hindu and Buddhist kingdoms were formed in Southeast Asia. These included Champa (192–1832 AD), the Khmer Empire (802–1431 AD), Dvaravati (6th-11th century AD), and the Shailendra dynasty (8th-11th century AD, ruling the Mataram kingdom and Srivijaya).

These cultures produced carved stone reliefs, which reveal musical instruments used in the cultures, including lutes. Lutes been seen in artwork at ruins in Thailand's Ku Bua (c. 650-700 AD), Vietnam's Mỹ Sơn (c. 850s AD), and Malaysia's Borobudur (9th century). The smaller oval bodied lutes resemble lutes from India in the Gupta period in the 4th and 5th centuries AD, and also the biwa family.

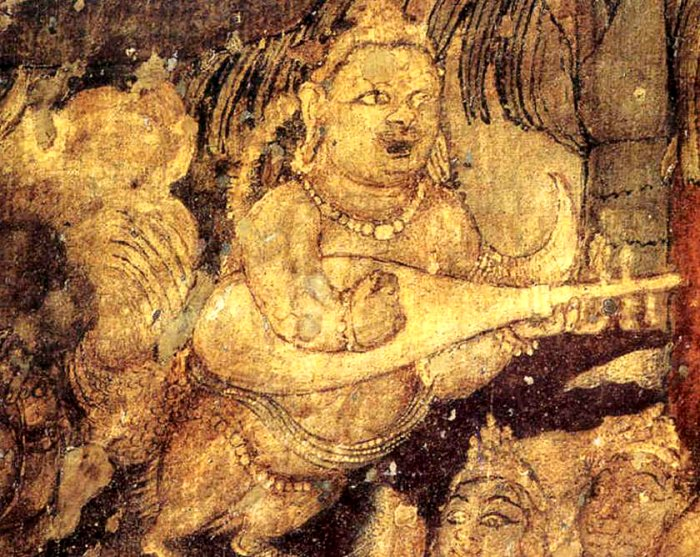
India, in Ajanta Caves, Cave 1, c. 450-490 AD. Kinnara with "kacchapī veena" (Sanskrit for "tortise veena") or panchangi veena (5-stringed veena). Part of the painting Bodhisattva Padmapani. (Note: The use of kacchapī veena is not settled and remains a name that researchers place onto examples of early veenas as a possibility. There is a difference of opinion between the published works of many western scholars (especially later 19th-century and early 20th-century scholars) and modern Indian scholars. Both colonialism and nationalism can have a role in people's beliefs about the research.)

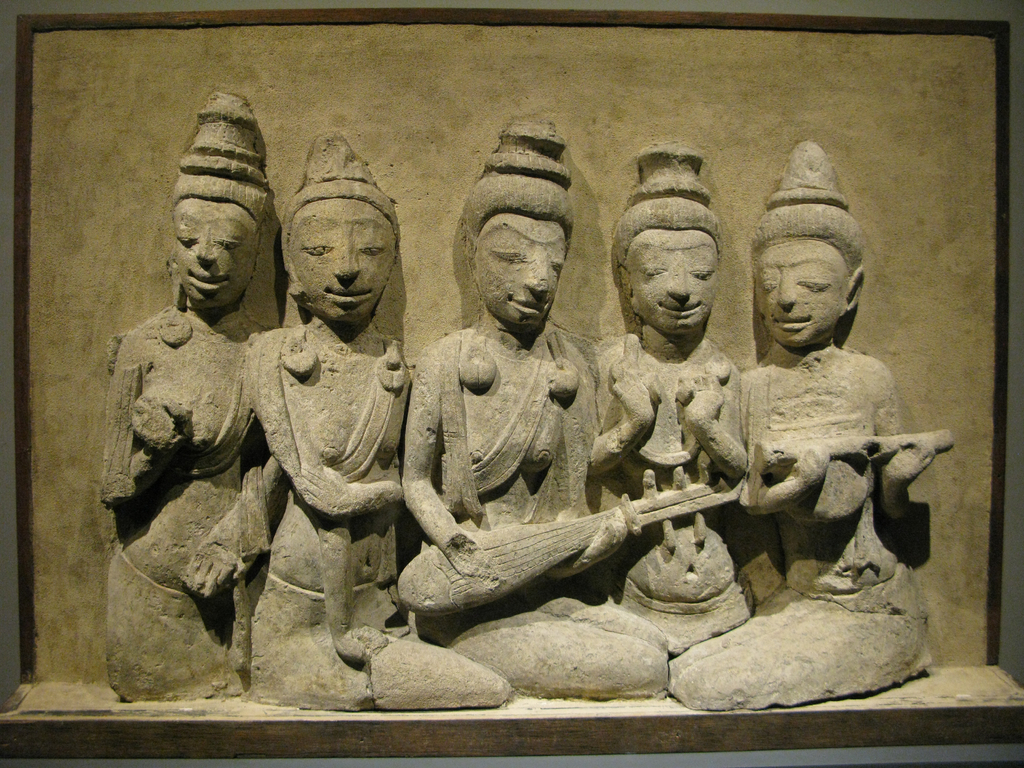
Hindu. 650-700 AD, Thailand, Ku Bua, (Dvaravati culture). Three musicians in right are playing (from center) a 5-stringed lute, cymbals, a tube zither or bar zither with gourd resonator.

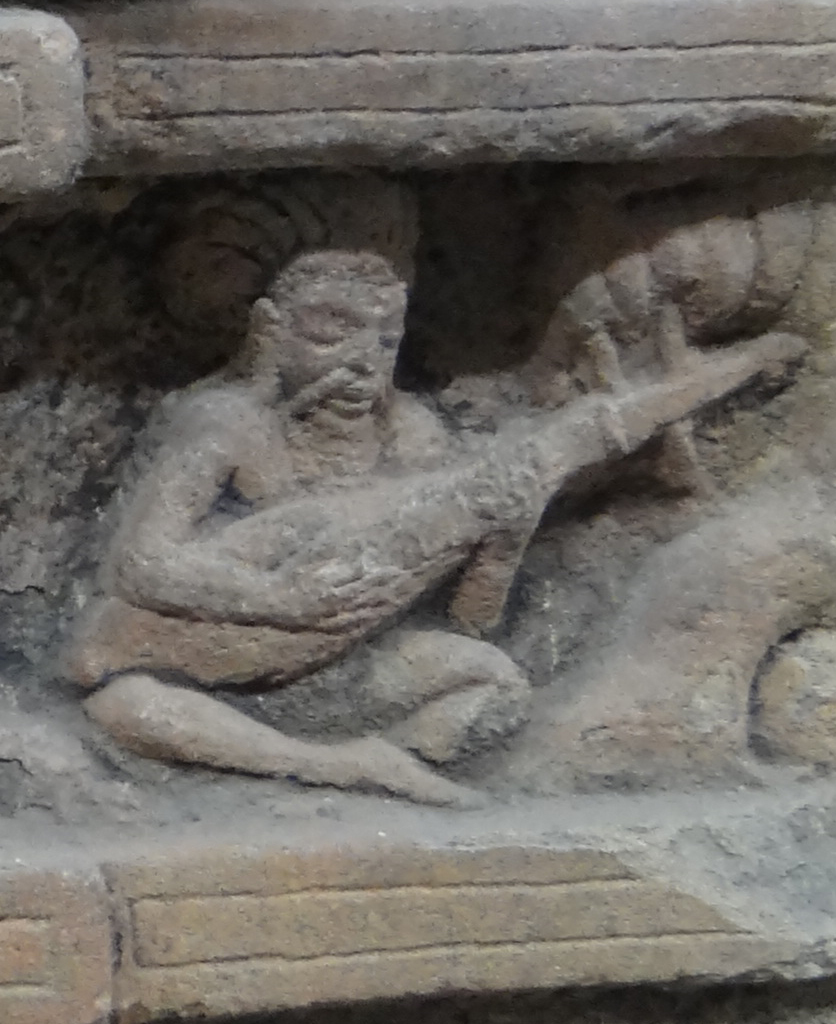
Hindu. 8th century AD, Champa. Cham lute, from the Mỹ Sơn pedestal E1 in the Museum of Cham Sculpture, Da Nang, Vietnam.

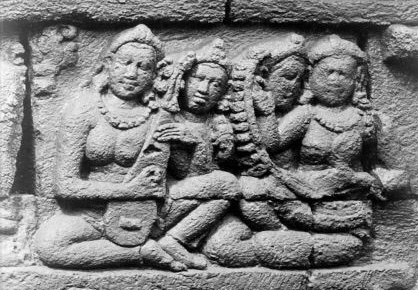
Hindu, Buddhist. 9th century AD, Borobudur (Shailendra dynasty). 3-stringed lute and harp. In this time, the Chinese pipa was still being played horizontally. Lute player may be using plectrum.

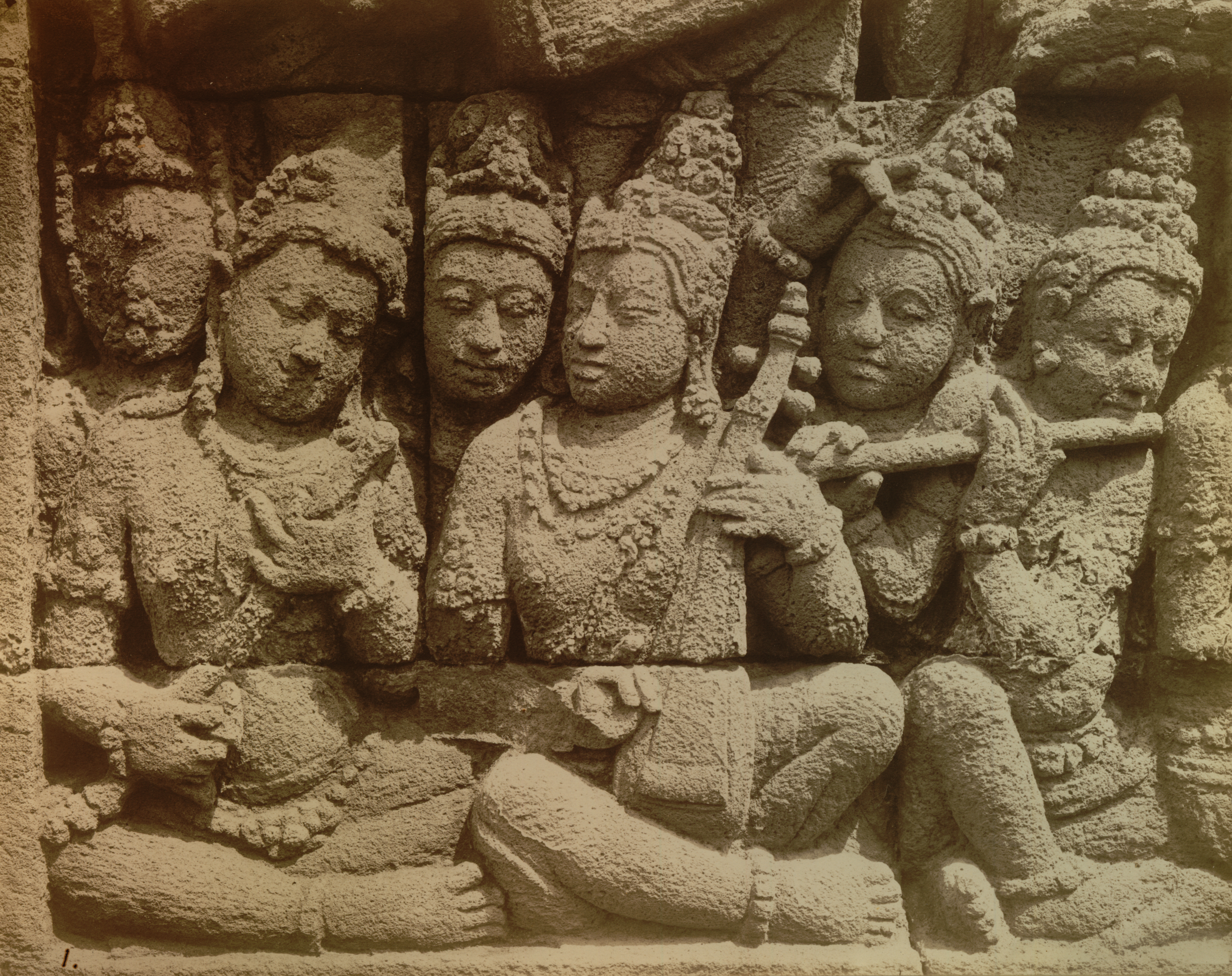
Hindu, Buddhist. 9th century AD, Borobudur (Shailendra dynasty). 3-stringed lute (second from left). It is a small part of a larger image illustrating the Lalitavistara Sūtra, Bodhisattva in Tusita Heaven.

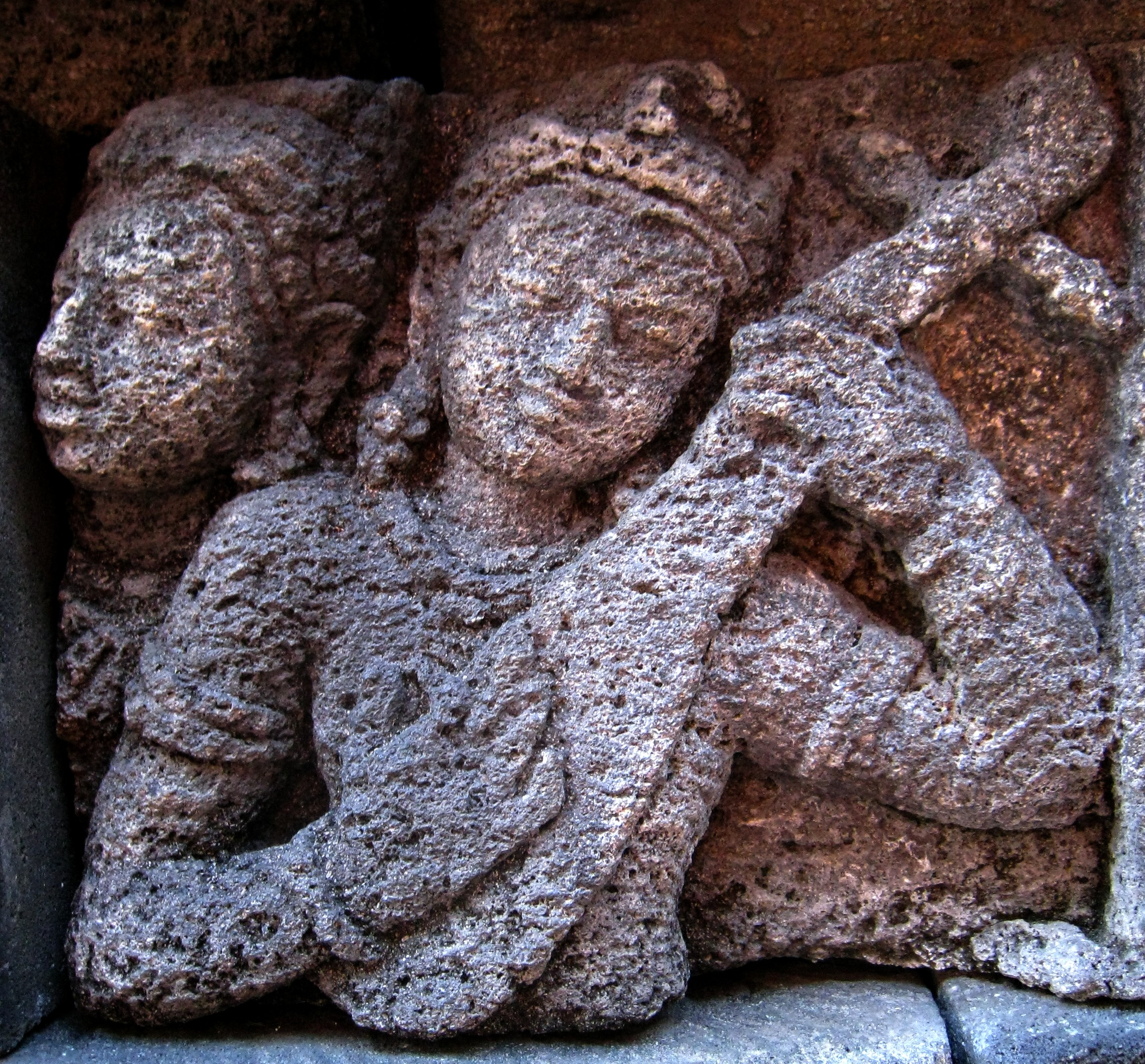
Hindu, Buddhist. 9th century AD, Borobudur, Level 3, 115 West Wall

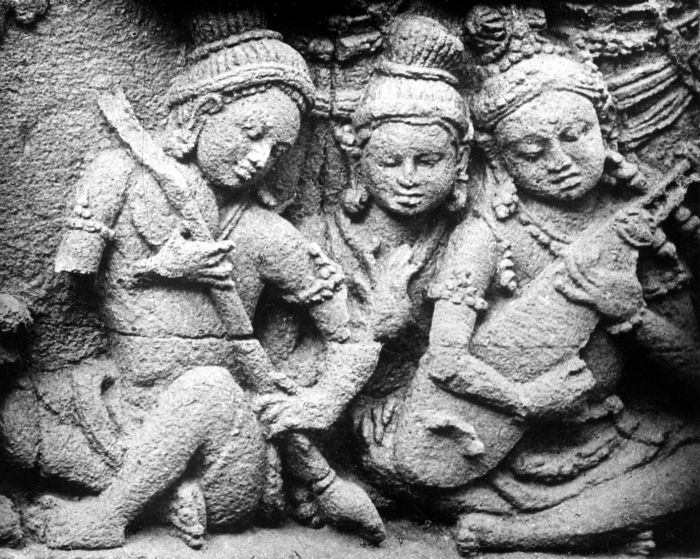
Hindu, Buddhist. 9th century AD, Borobudur, from the now buried "hidden base" section of the monument. Stick zither (left) and a lute.

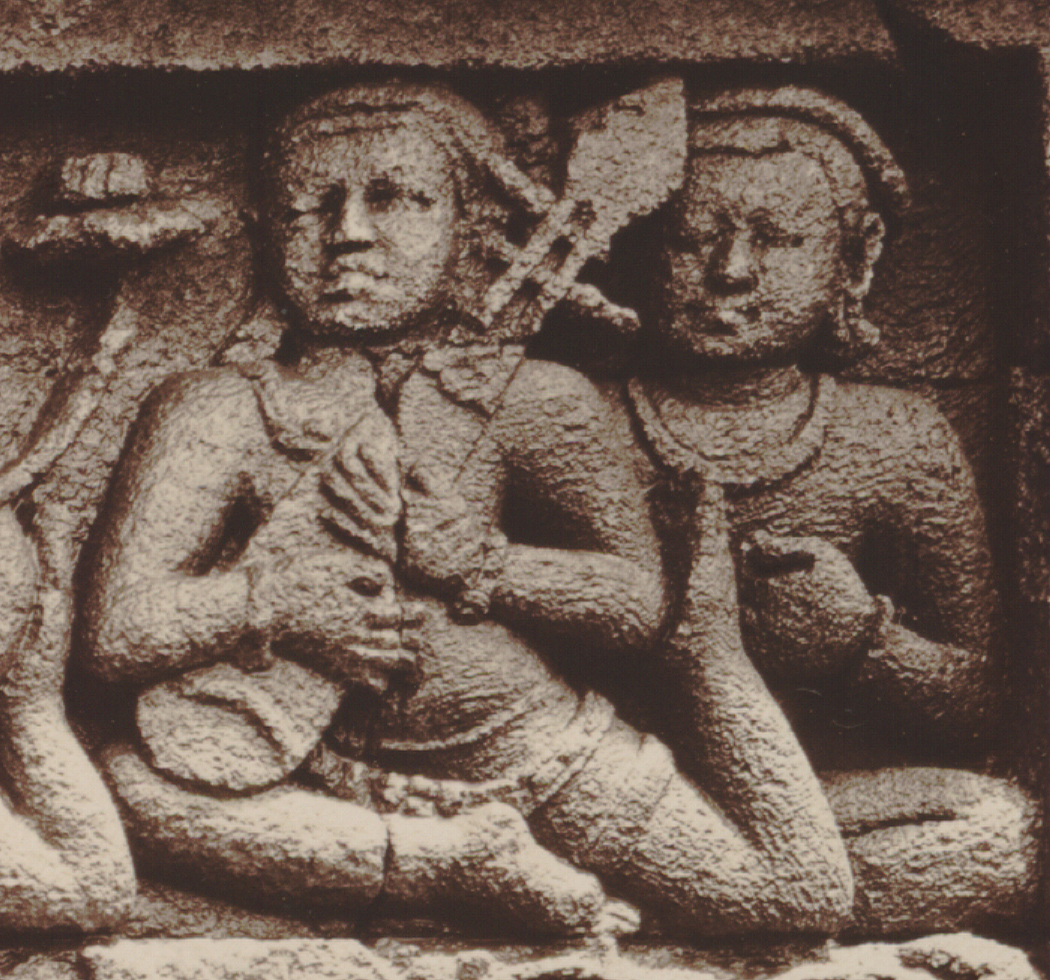
Hindu, Buddhist. 9th century AD, Borobudur (second gallery, main wall). Girl in a dance position playing a lute.

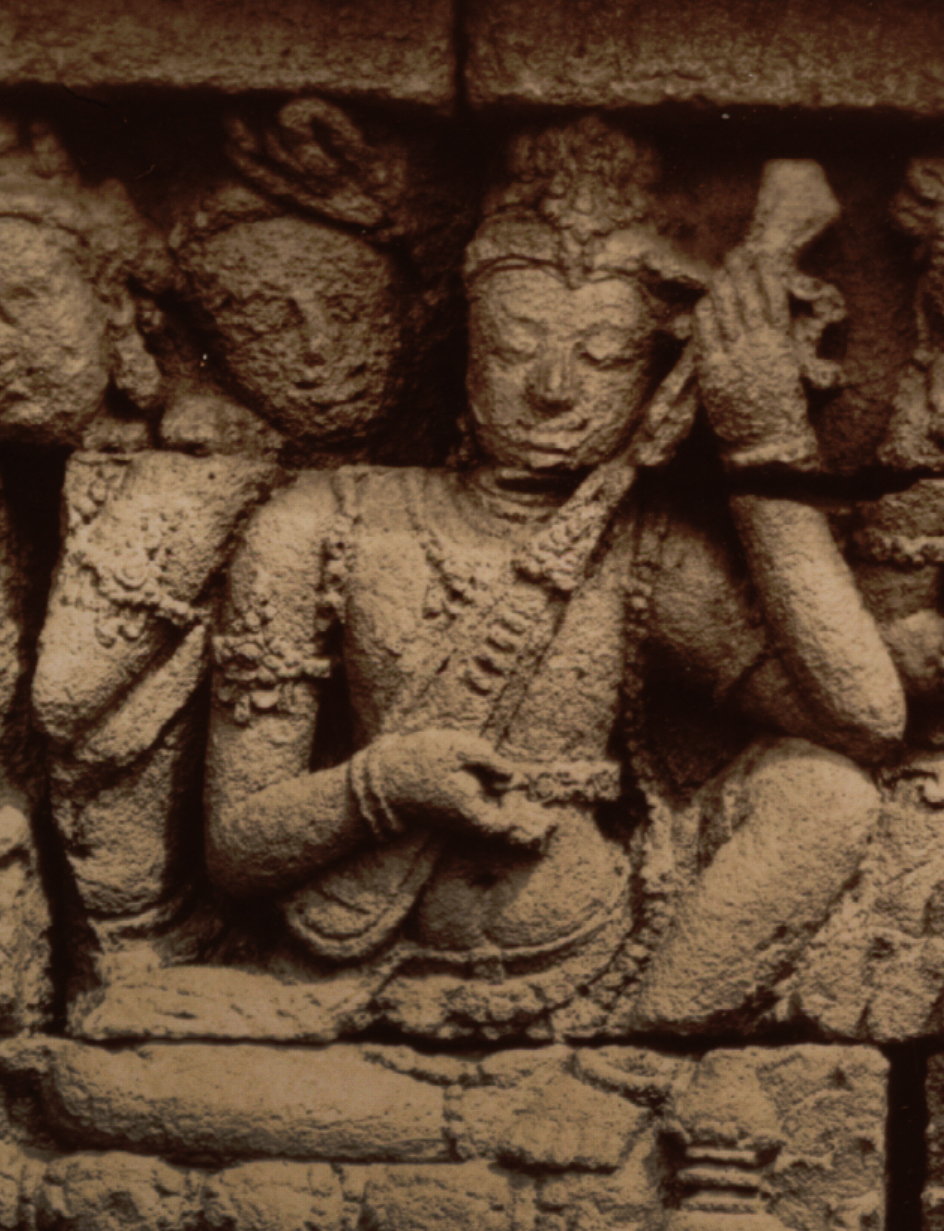
Hindu, Buddhist. Brodobudur, second gallery, main wall. Lute with frets

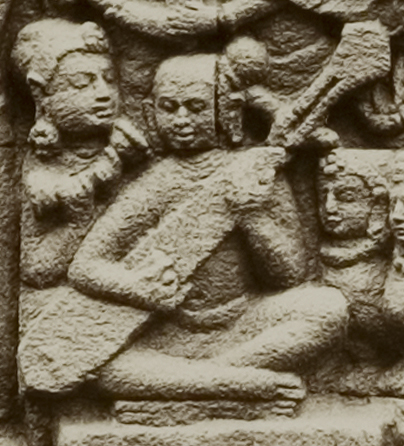
Hindu, Buddhist. Borobudur (buried section), 1890–1891. Lute resembling modern sapeh.

==== Boat lutes in the island regions ====
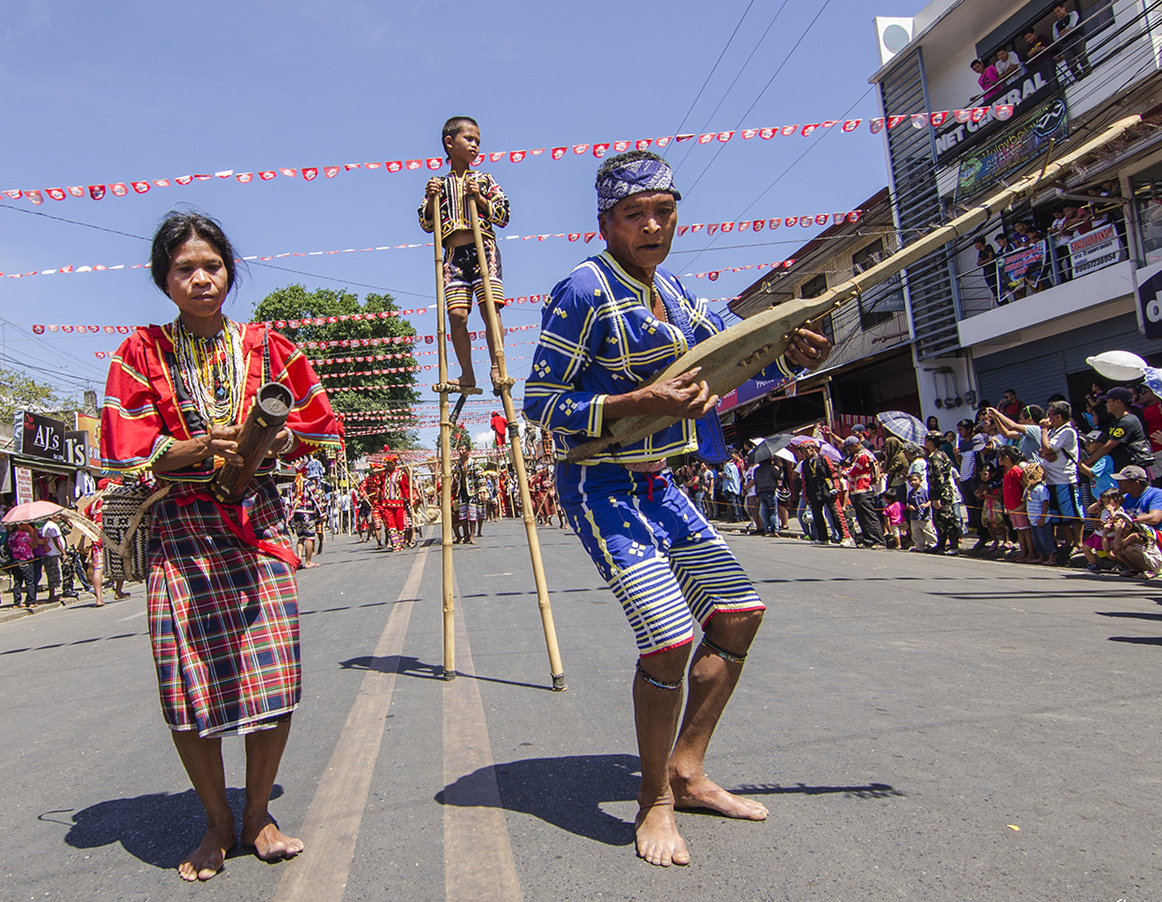
Lumad musicians playing kudyapi (right) and tube zither during the 2016 Kaamulan Festival of Bukidnon.

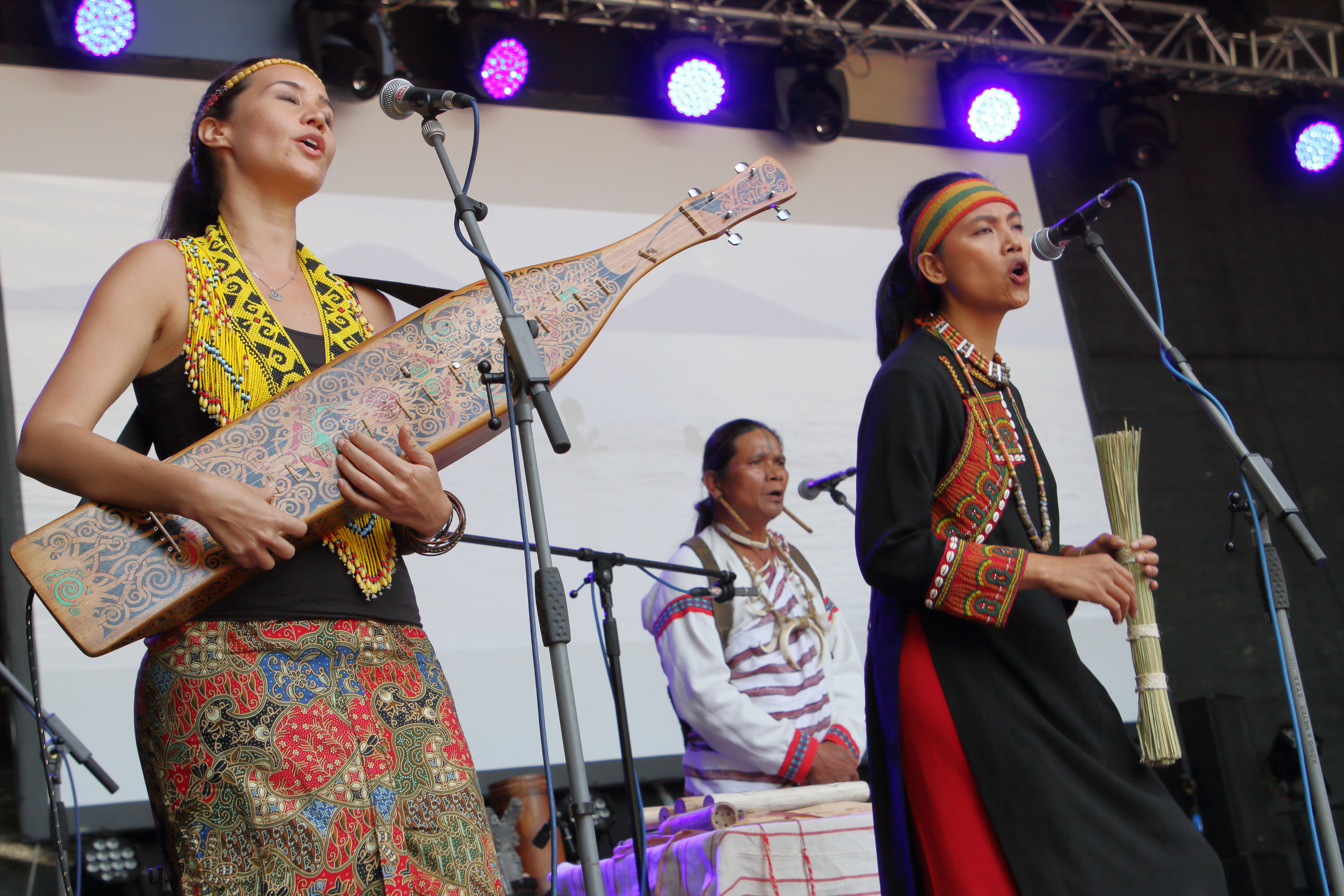
Sapeh being played at Rudolstadt-Festival 2019. The musicians come from different islands of the Pacifik and Indian Ocean.

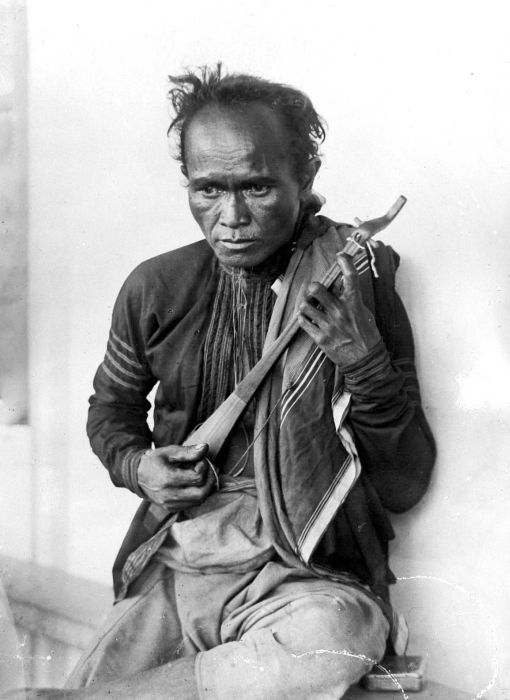
Si Datas on kulcapi, Karo Regency, 1914–1919.

Modern boat lutes in the island regions of Southeast Asia include the Sapeh from Borneo, the Sumatran Hasapi and Philippine Kutiyapi. The history of these has not been fully documented, but musicologists look to India for origins. Hans Brandeis, a researching musicologist working with the Philippine Kutiyapi lutes, considers the instrument could have traveled to the Philippines by way of Myanmar, Cambodia and Thailand. He pointed out similarities between the alligator zithers of those countries, such as the Chakhe or Mi gyaung and the boat lutes, including the way they are strung with a melody and drone string, movable frets and a plectrum tied to a finger to play. Another feature in common is the way the alligator zithers and boat lutes are made, carved out of a log from the back, leaving a wooden soundboard intact in the front.

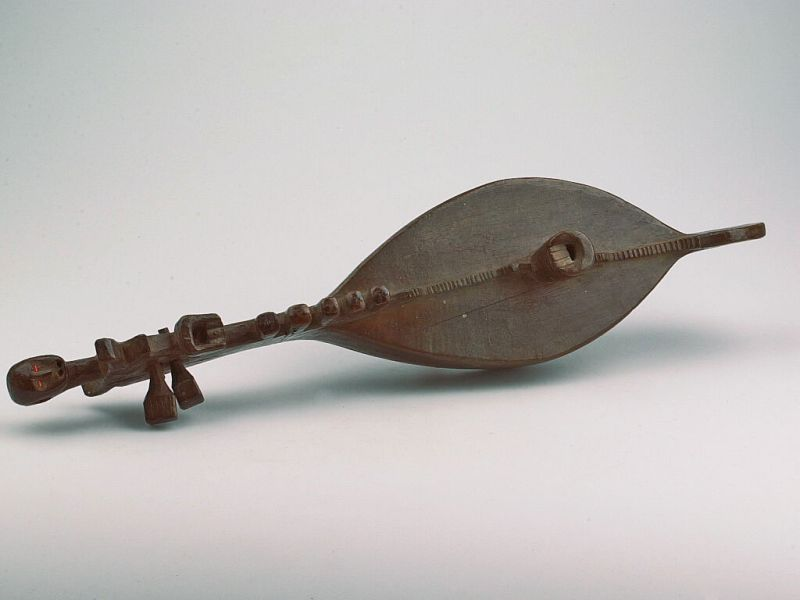
Pre-1951, Sumba, Indonesia. A jungga boat lute.

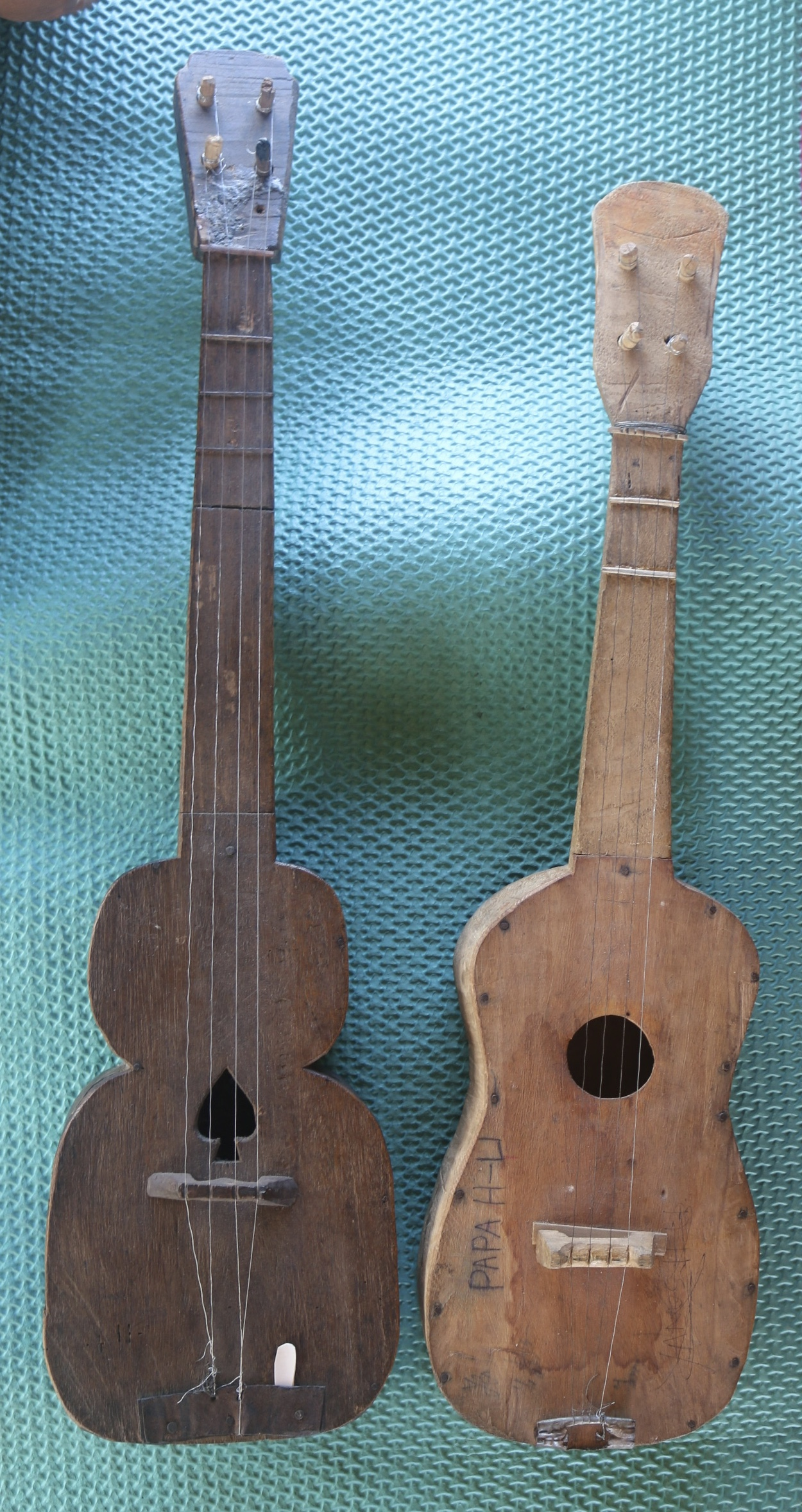
Sumba. A junga, showing influence of Portuguese instruments on lute-making culture, now a guitar-family instrument.

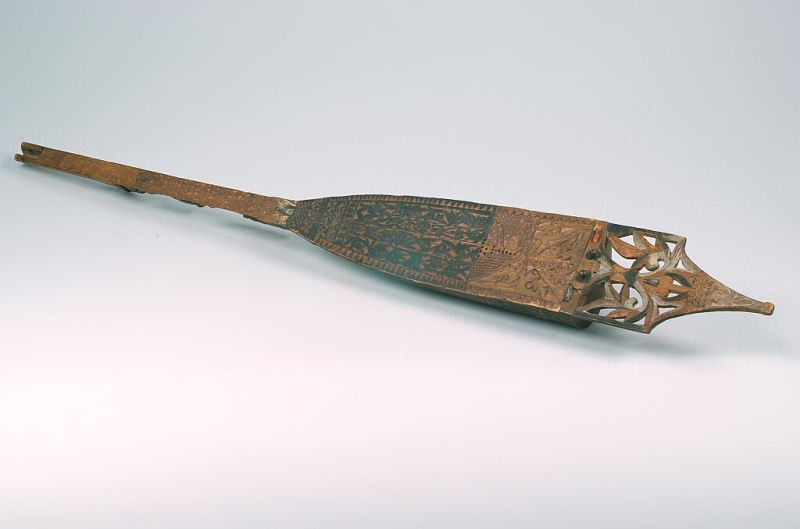
1948, Borneo. Boat lute (not named when collected).

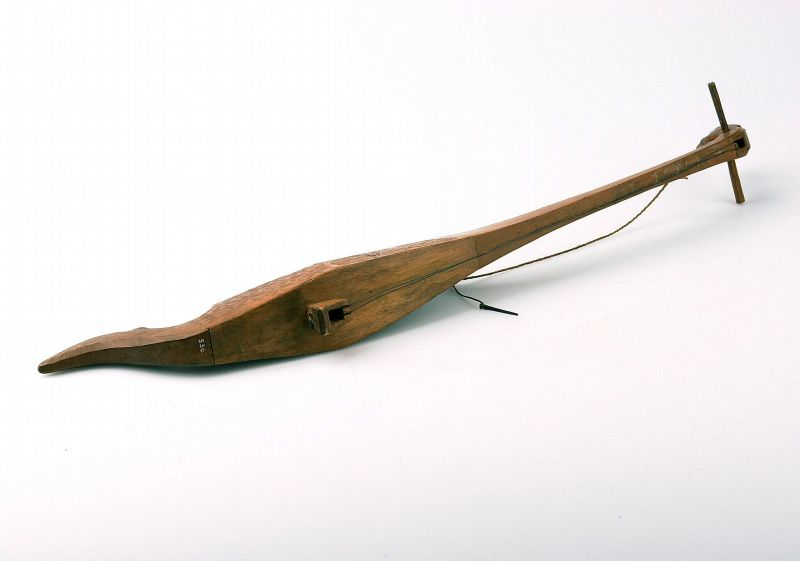
Pre-1953, Toba Batak people. Riman boat lute. Appears to be carved from top with separate soundboard.

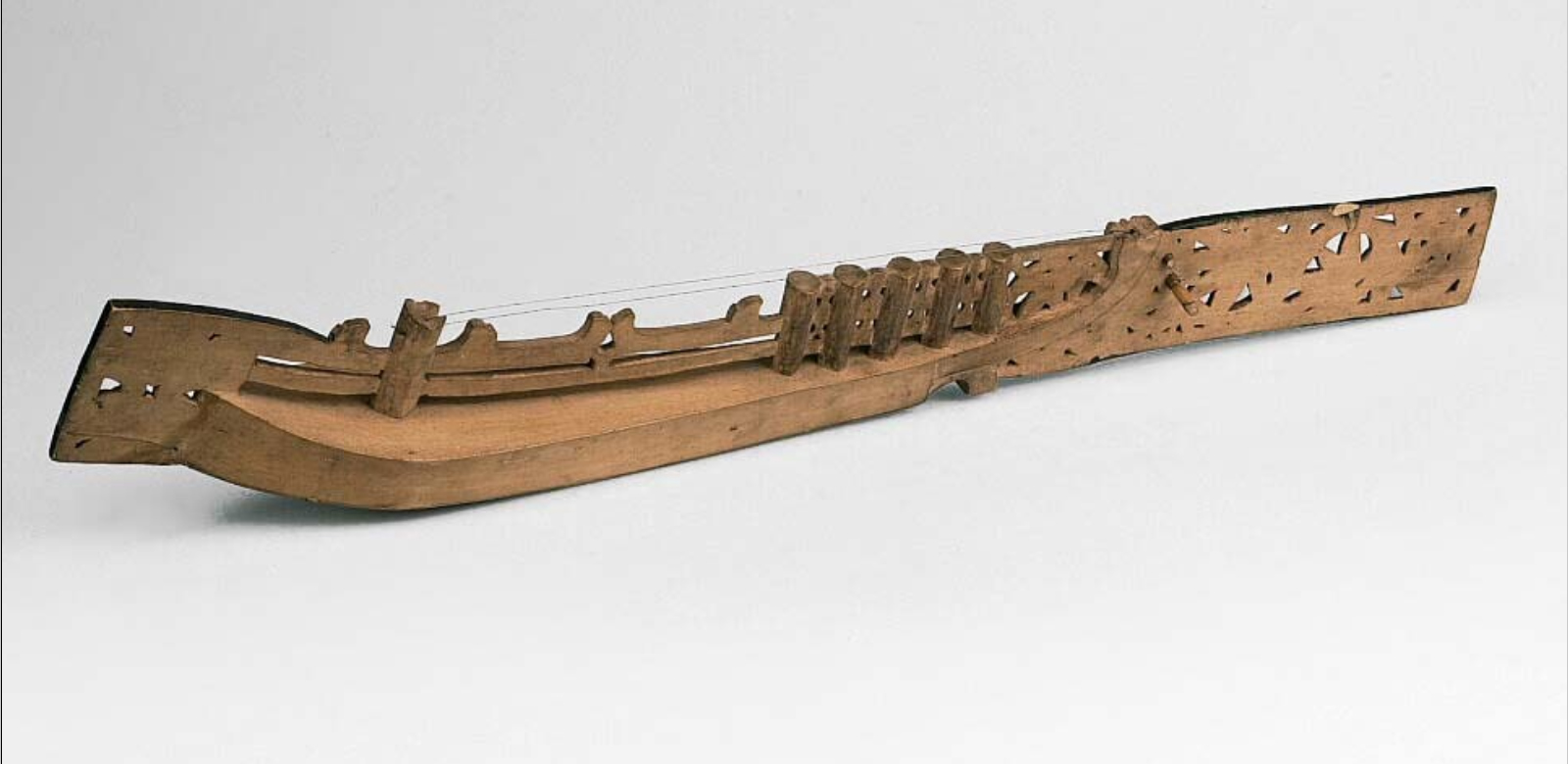
Pre-1942, Southern Sulawesi. Ketjapi.

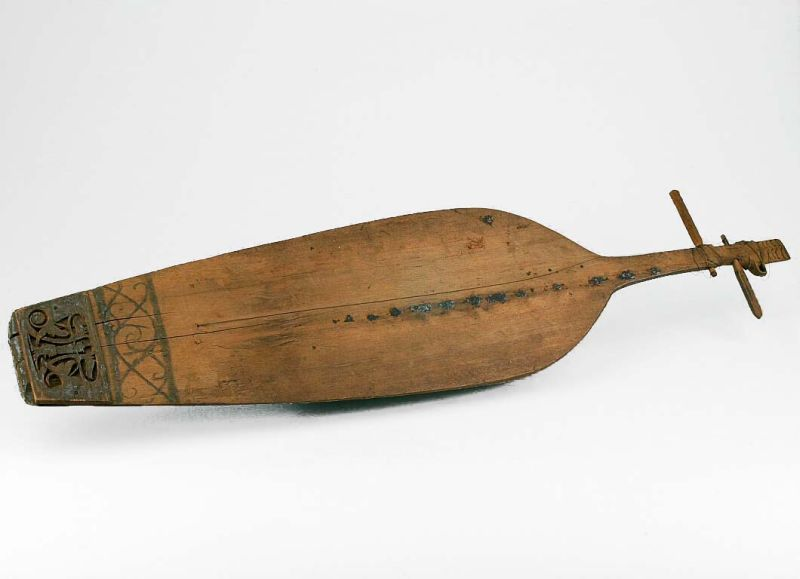
Pre-1940, Kenyah people, Indonesia. Ketjapi.

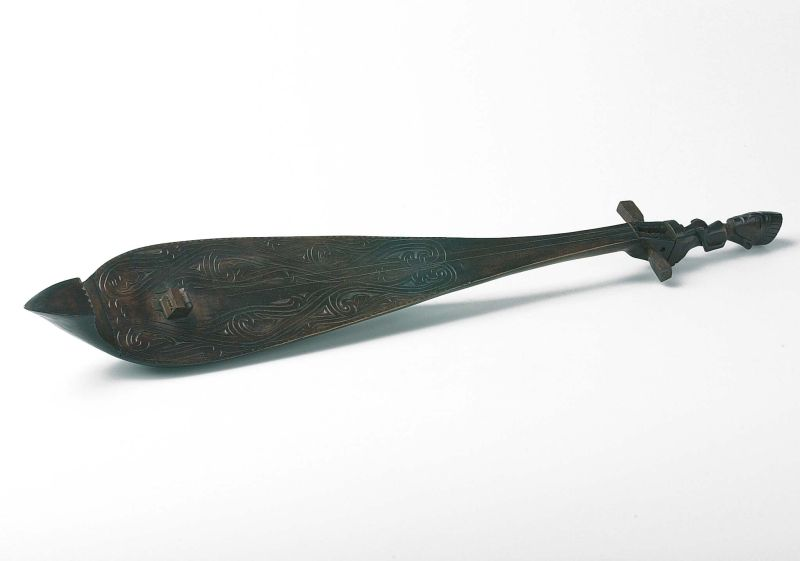
Pre-1986, Toba Batak people. Hasapi.

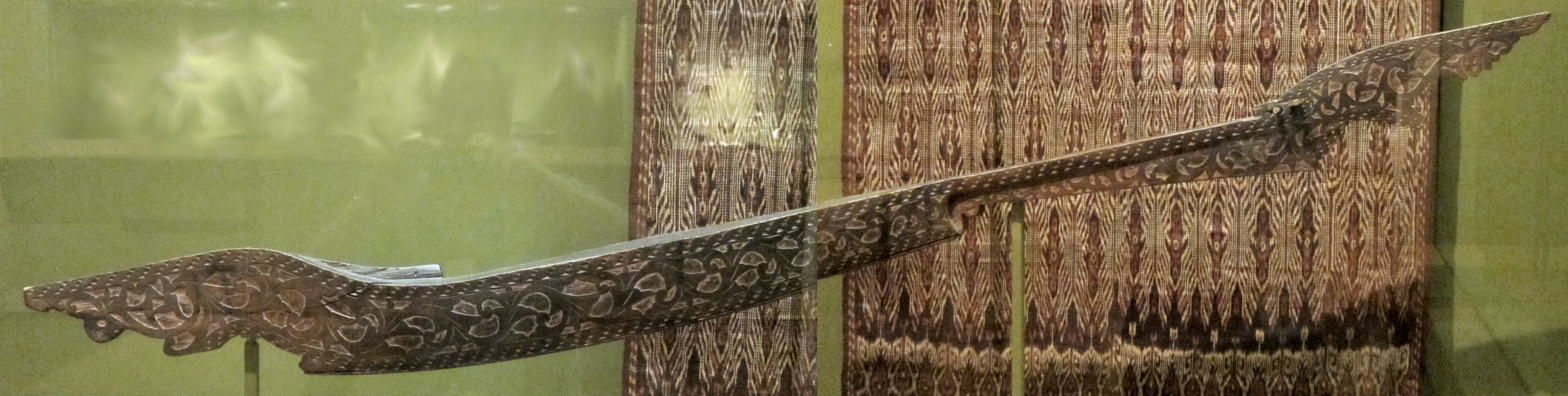
Maguindanao, Philippines. Kutiyapi decorated with ukkil motifs.

==== Muslim-origin lutes in Malaysia and Indonesia ====
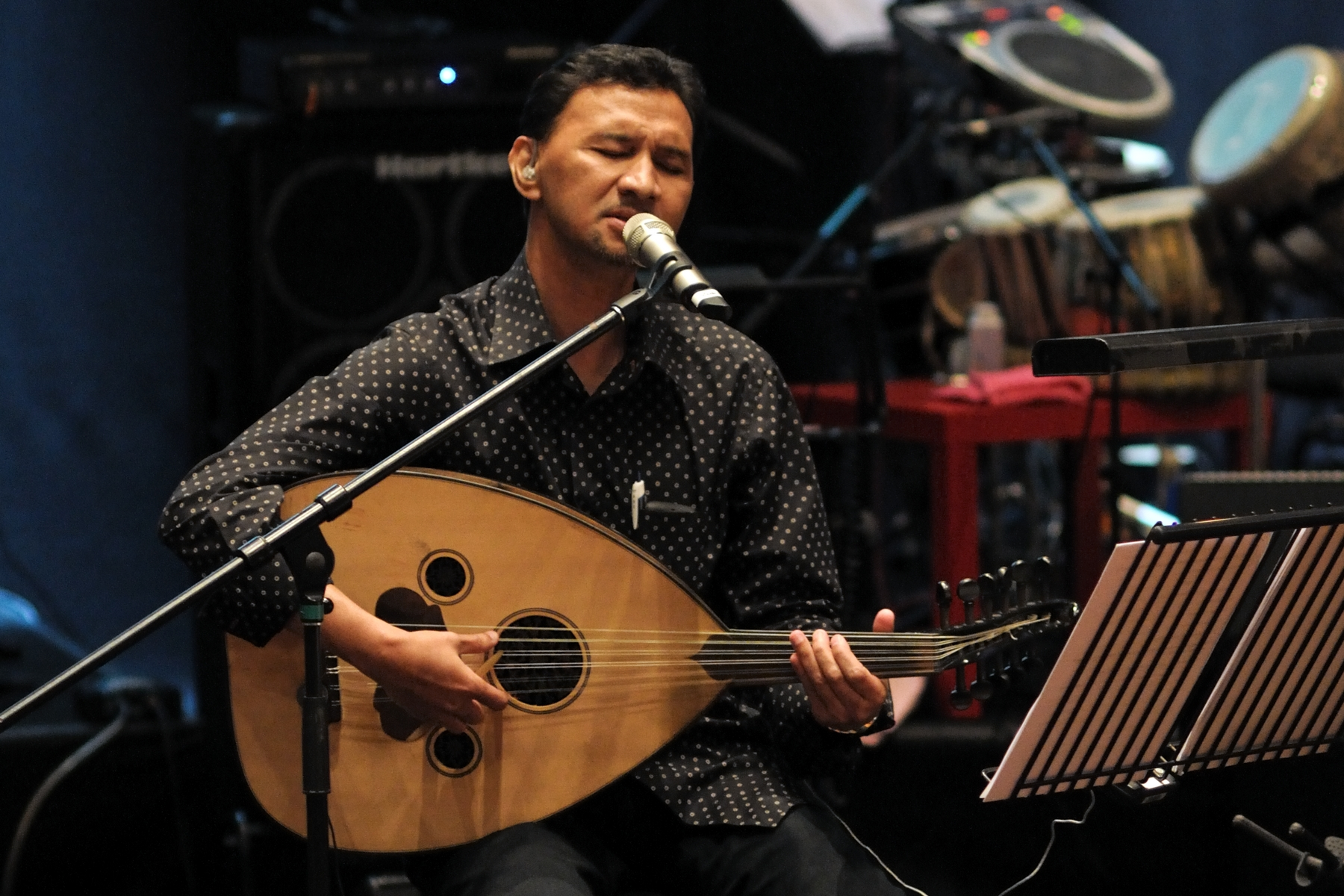
2010, Malaysia. Musician playing wood-topped gambus modeled on oud.

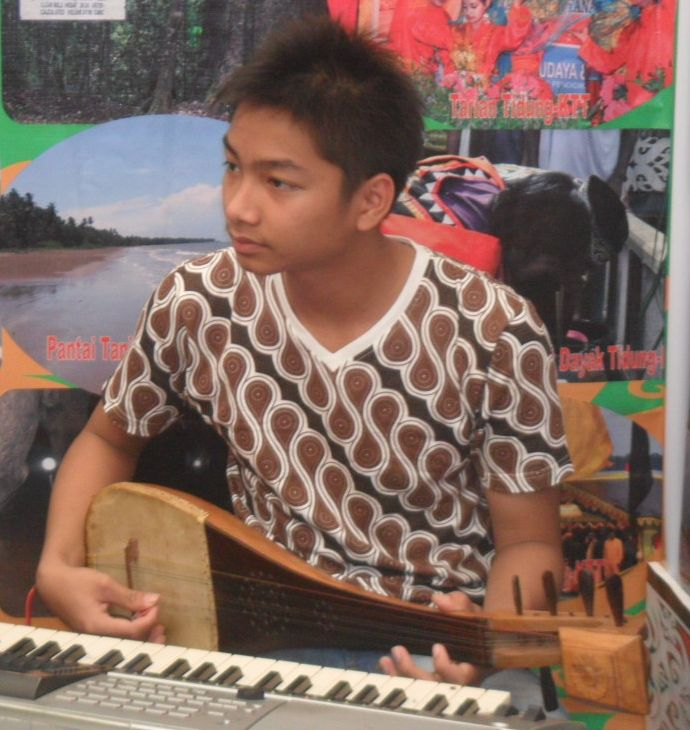
Boy playing a gambus, a local name for the quanbus-like instrument.

After the fall of Borobudur, Indian influence declined. The arrival of Muslim traders and communities would add further influences to the region's music as Muslim communities were established throughout the region. Immigrants from Yemen brought with them the qanbūs a skin-topped lute.

The instruments were "transmitted" from the Muslim world to the Malay at an undermined time. Links to the Middle East begin as early as the 5th or 6th centuries AD, with trading networks and occupation in the 15th century. Experts have tentatively given dates for the instruments' arrival between the 9th and 15th centuries AD. In looking for origins, musicologists have also noted some similarities with the Chinese pipa.

Following a new wave of immigrants from Yemen in the 18th century, the term gambus began being applied to an instrument resembling the oud with a wood soundboard, instead of the skin soundboard of the other gambus and the qanbus.

== Lute from an African tradition ==
Africa today retains the largest variety of skin-topped pierced lutes, in which the neck is a stick that penetrates the body of the instrument. In some, the neck pokes out the bottom and strings are attached there. Others have the neck end within the instrument's body, edge of the neck's end poking up through the skin, securing the strings. These are not merely instruments brought in from outside and copied across generations, but include instruments that originate from local designs. Ultimately the banjo was one of these.

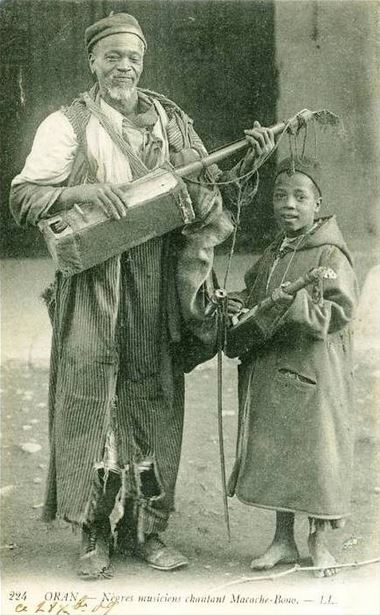
Oran, Algeria, early 20th century. The geumbri is also an instrument of Morocco, used in Gnawa ceremonies.

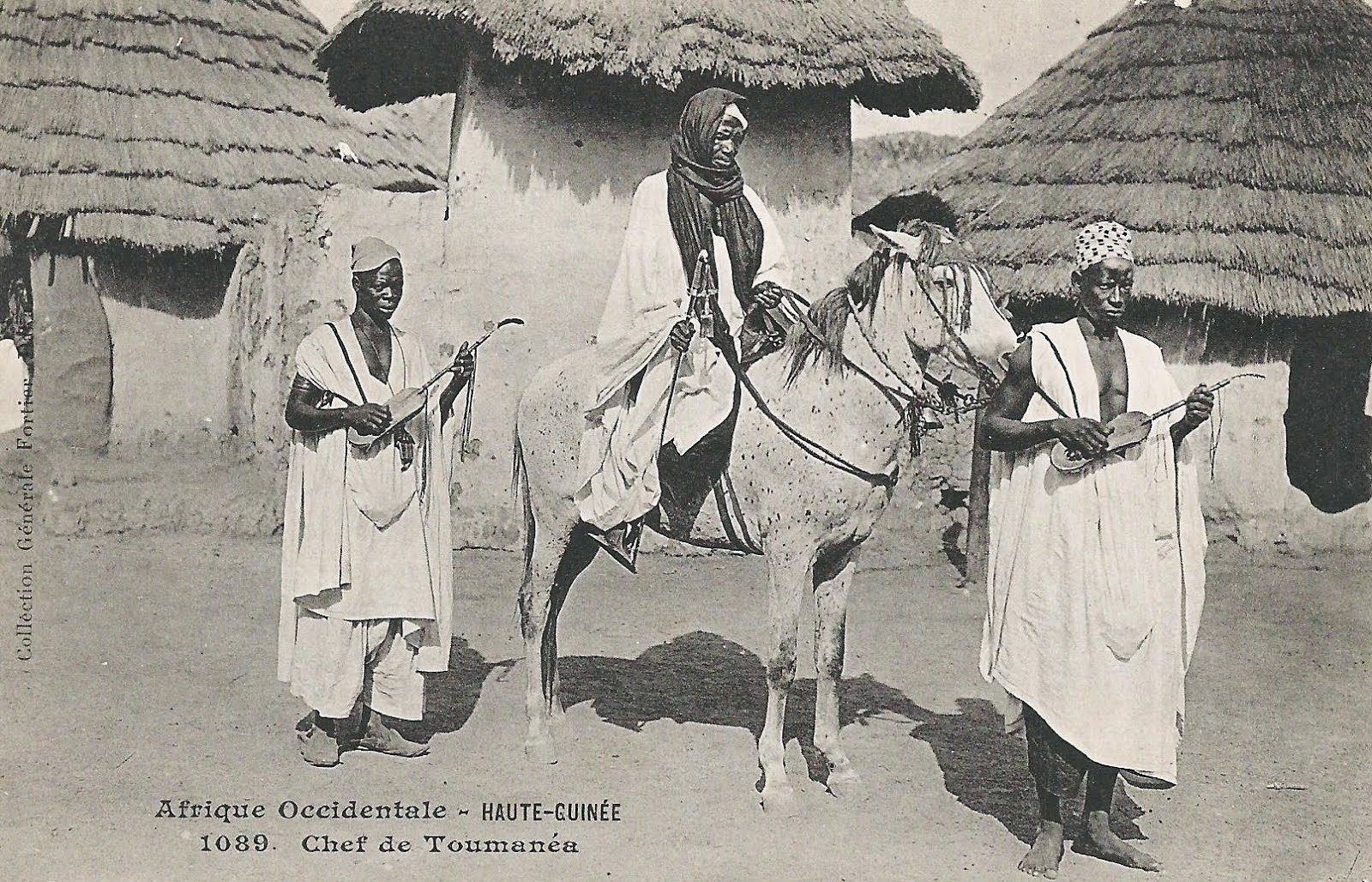
Haute Guinea, 1905. Instrument is about the same size as the kontigi, a one-string lute used by Muslims in West Africa.

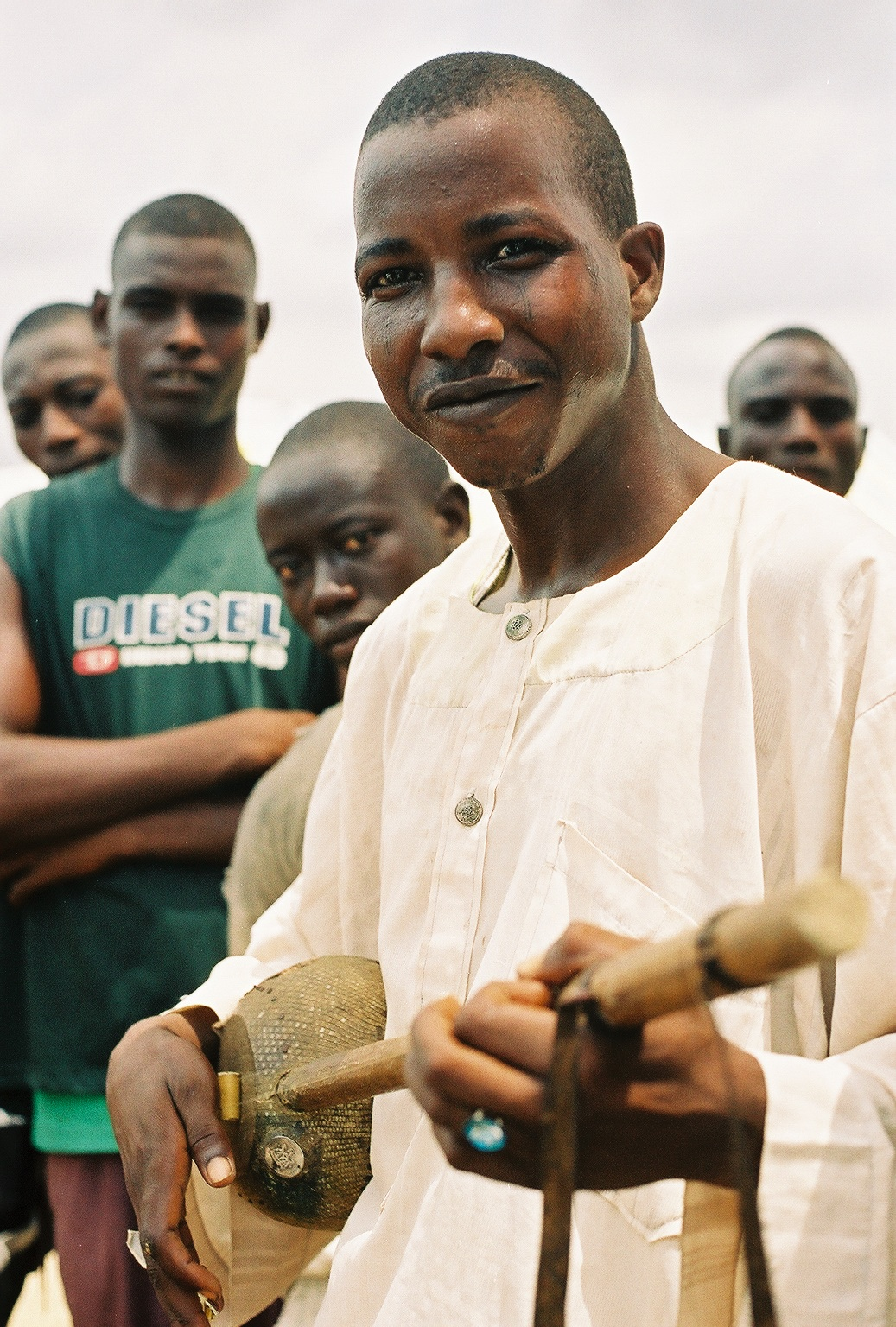
Niger and northern Nigeria. Hausa musician playing a gurmi.

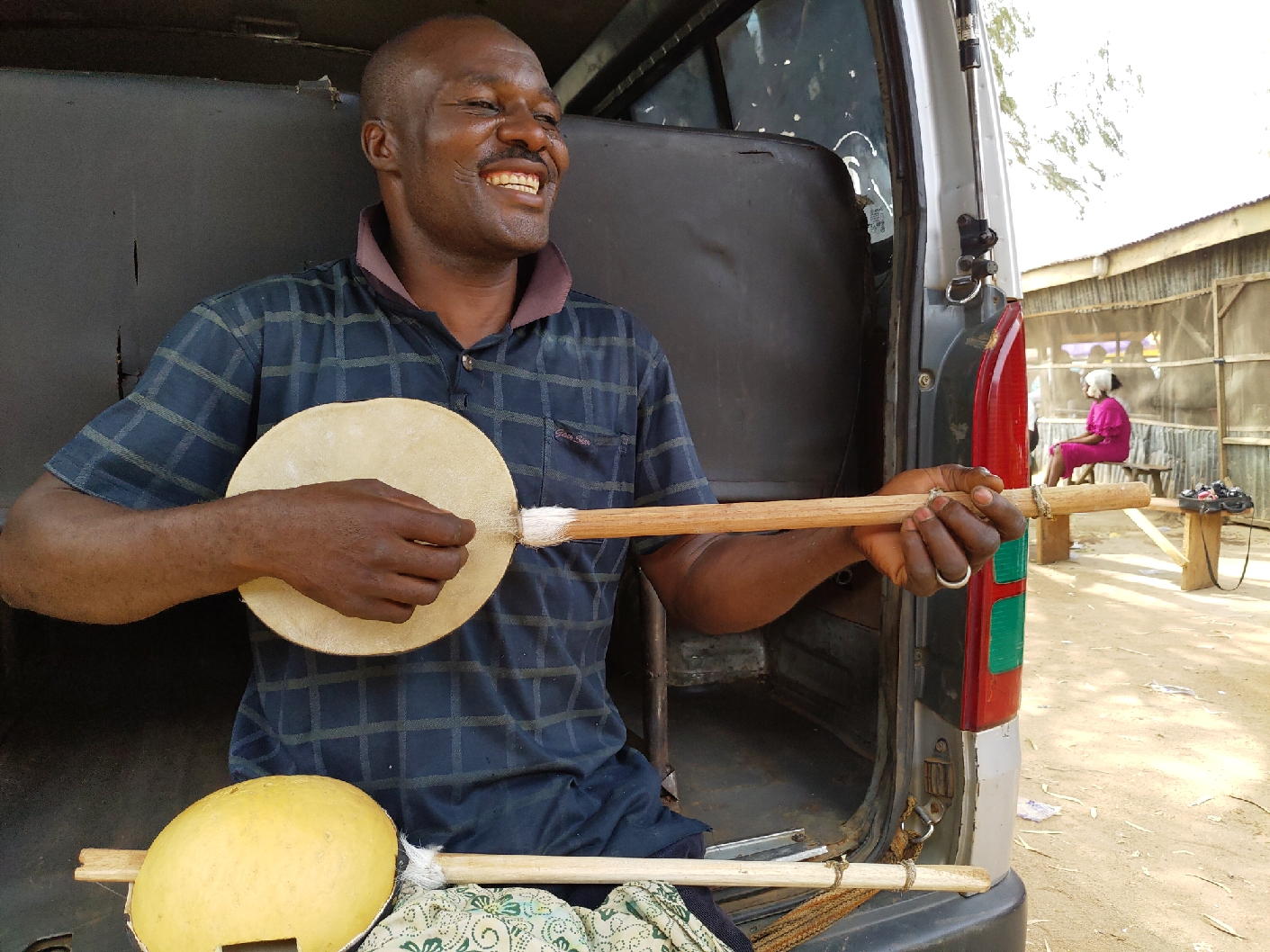
Niger and northern Nigeria. Fulani musician playing a gourd bodied garaya. The Hausa also make the instrument, with a wood body.

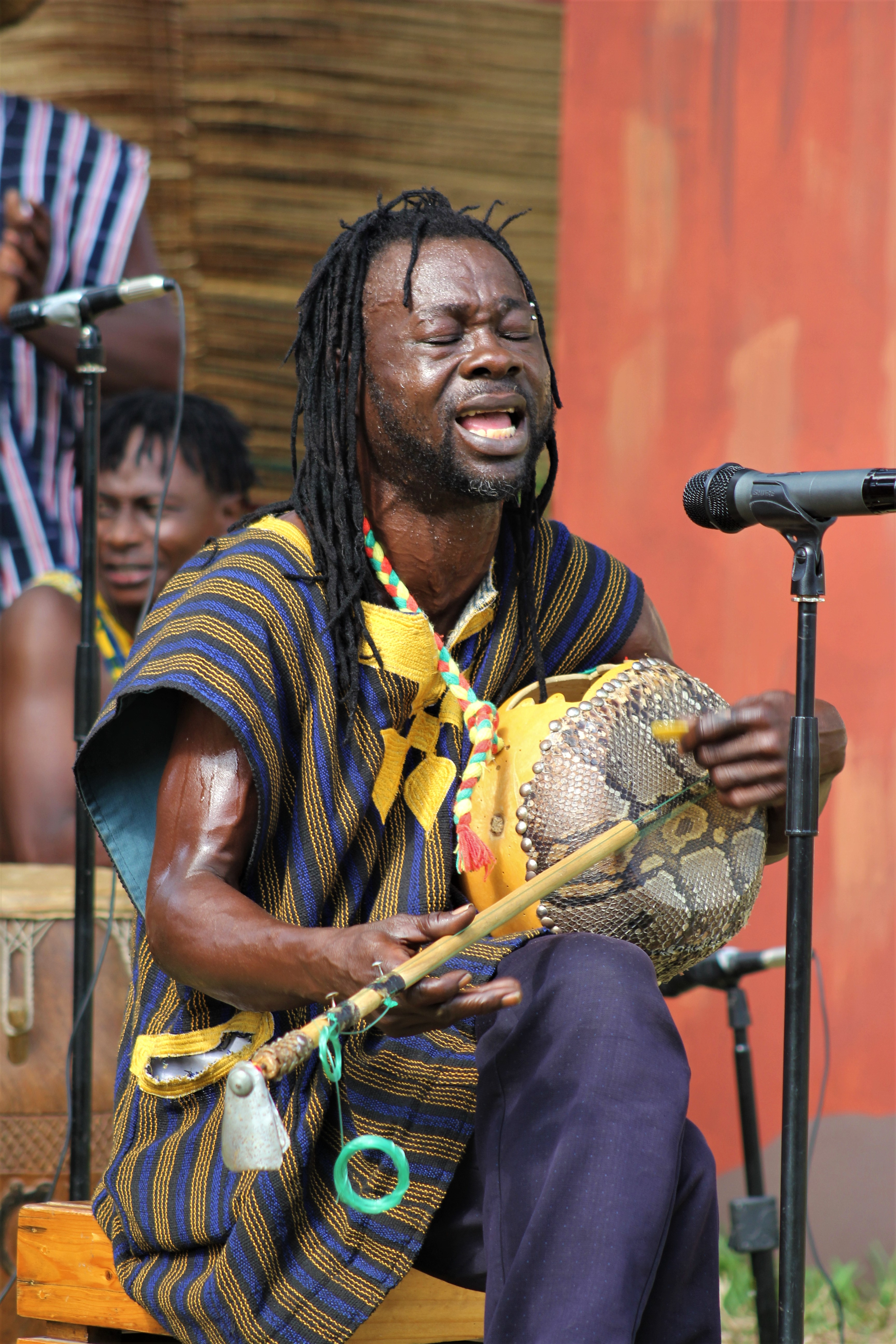
Ghana, 2023. Musician playing a kolog.

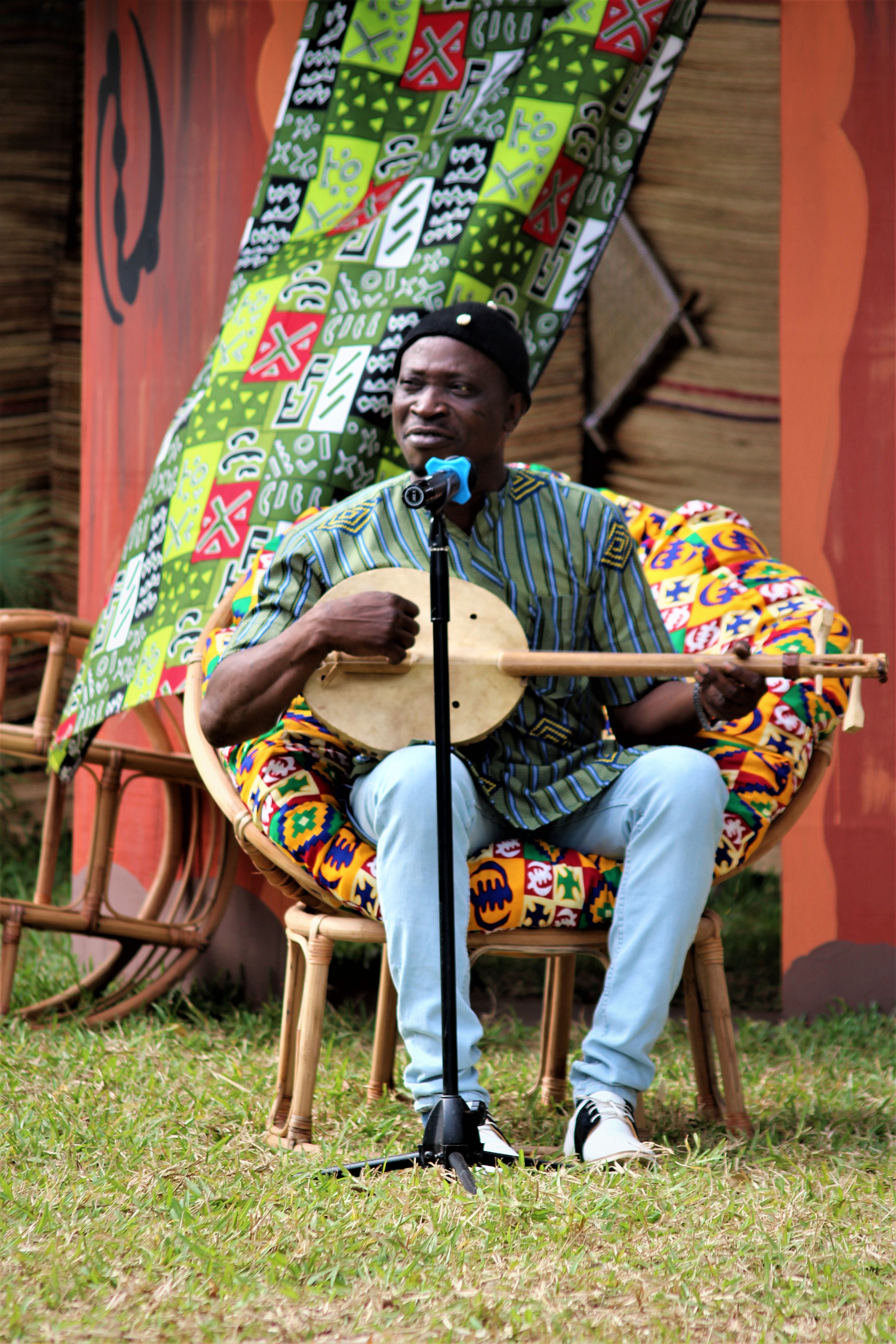
Atongo Zimba, Ghana, playing a kologo.

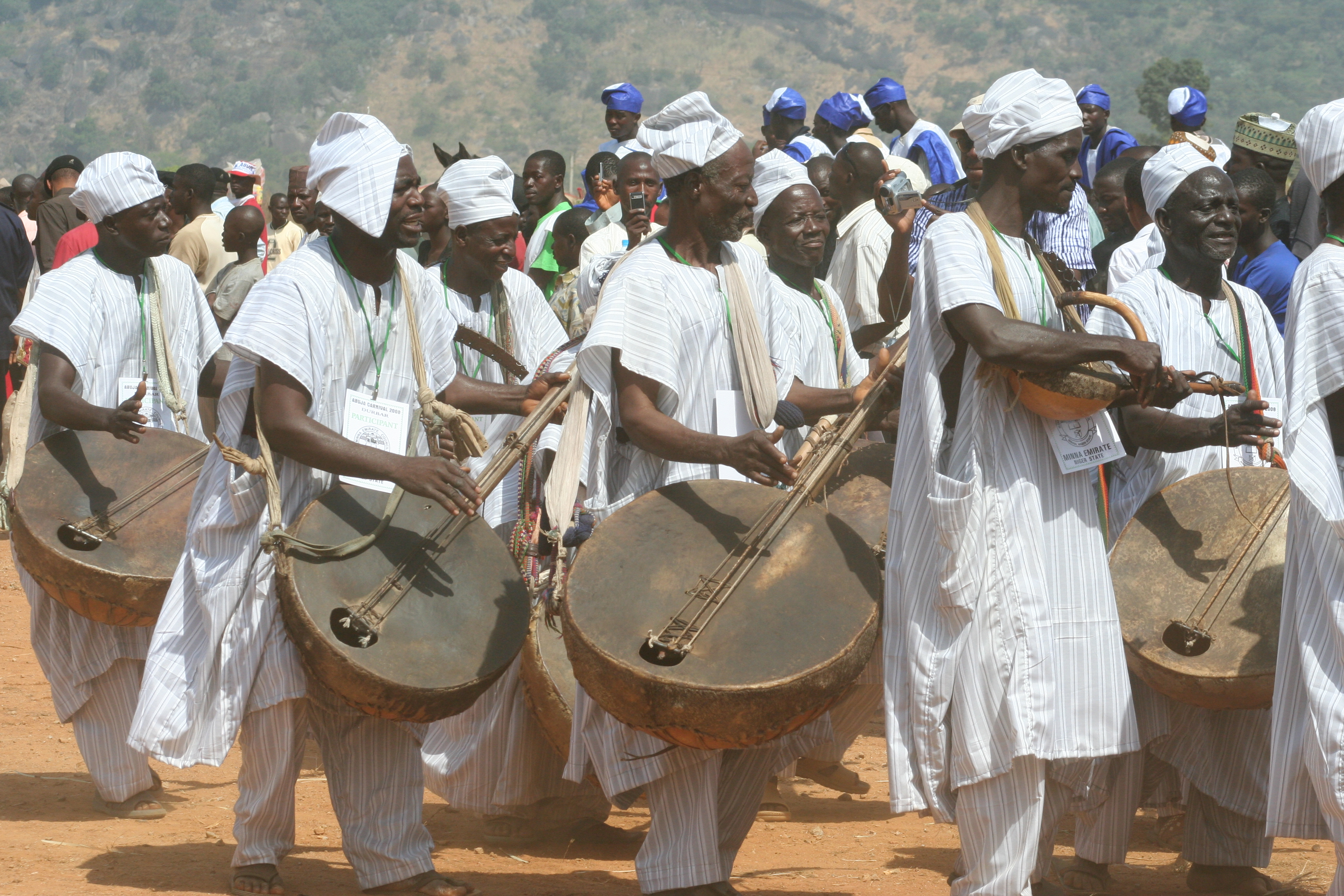
Northern Nigeria, 2008. Hausa musicians playing bass lutes (probably babbar garaya or komo) and one playing the goge bowed lute. The Gbagyi call the instrument kaburu.

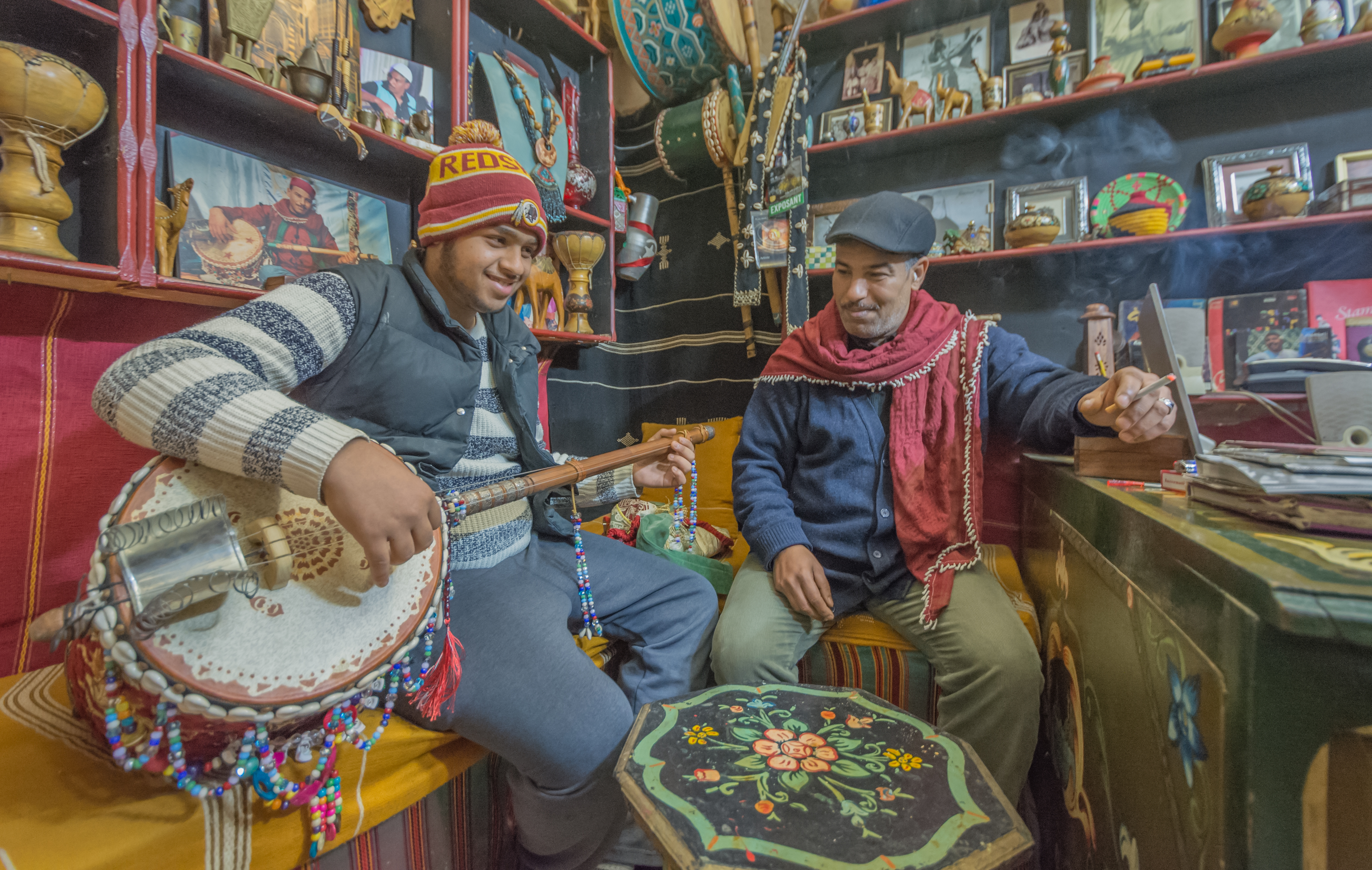
Tunisia, 2017. Musician playing large-bodied gombri.

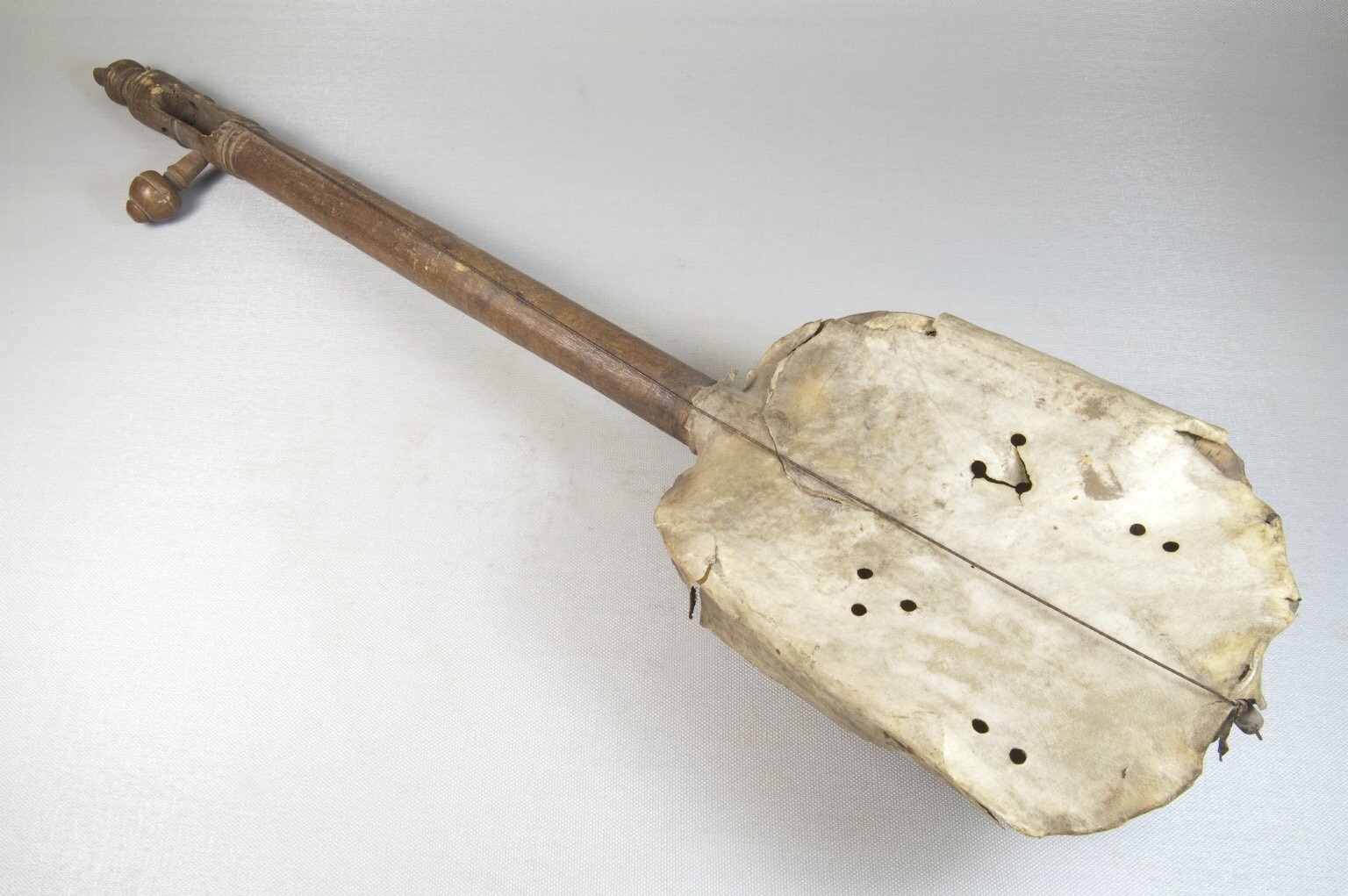
Lute with turtle-shell body, Democratic Republican of the Congo

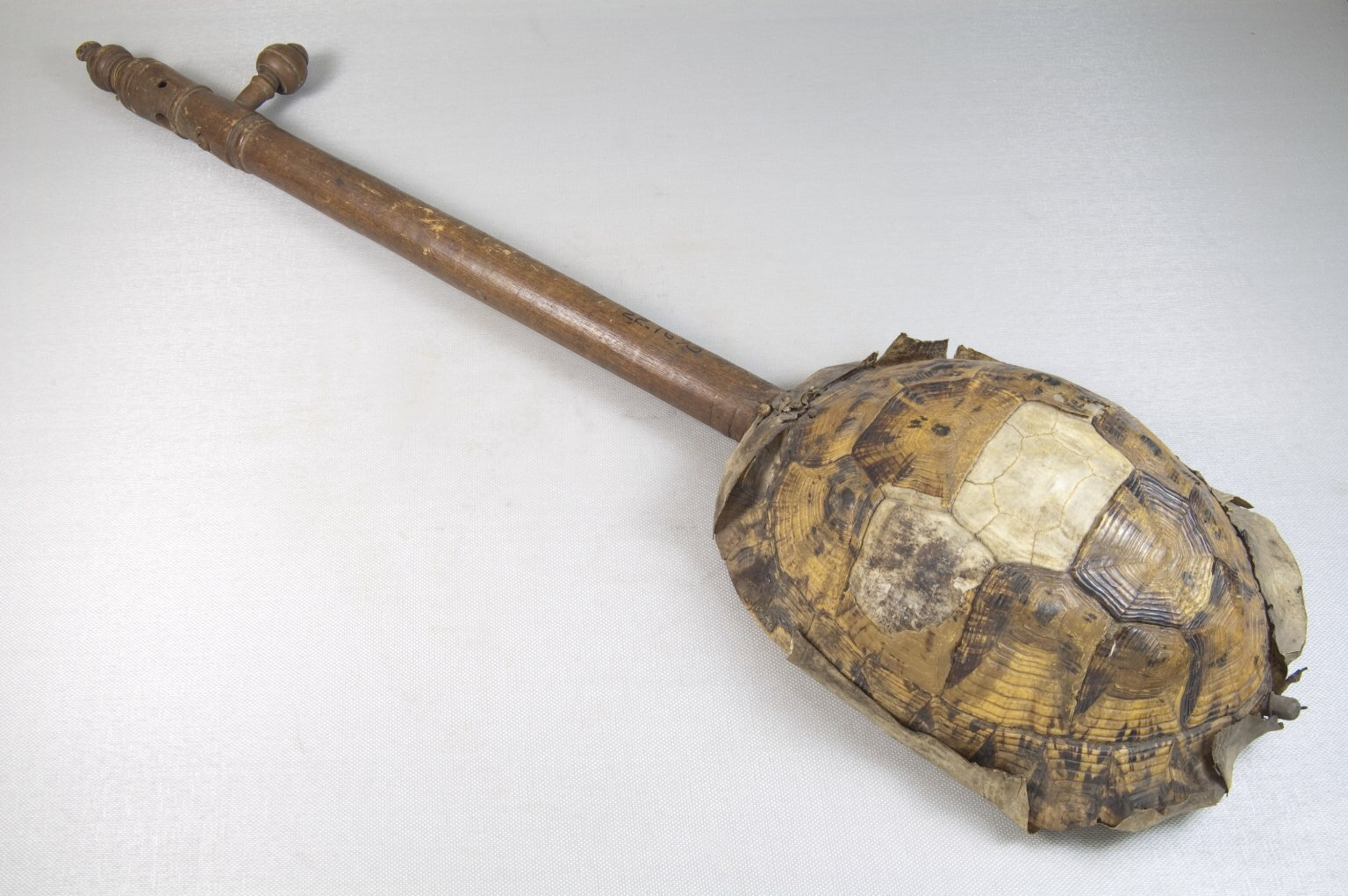
Lute with turtle-shell body, back, Democratic Republican of the Congo

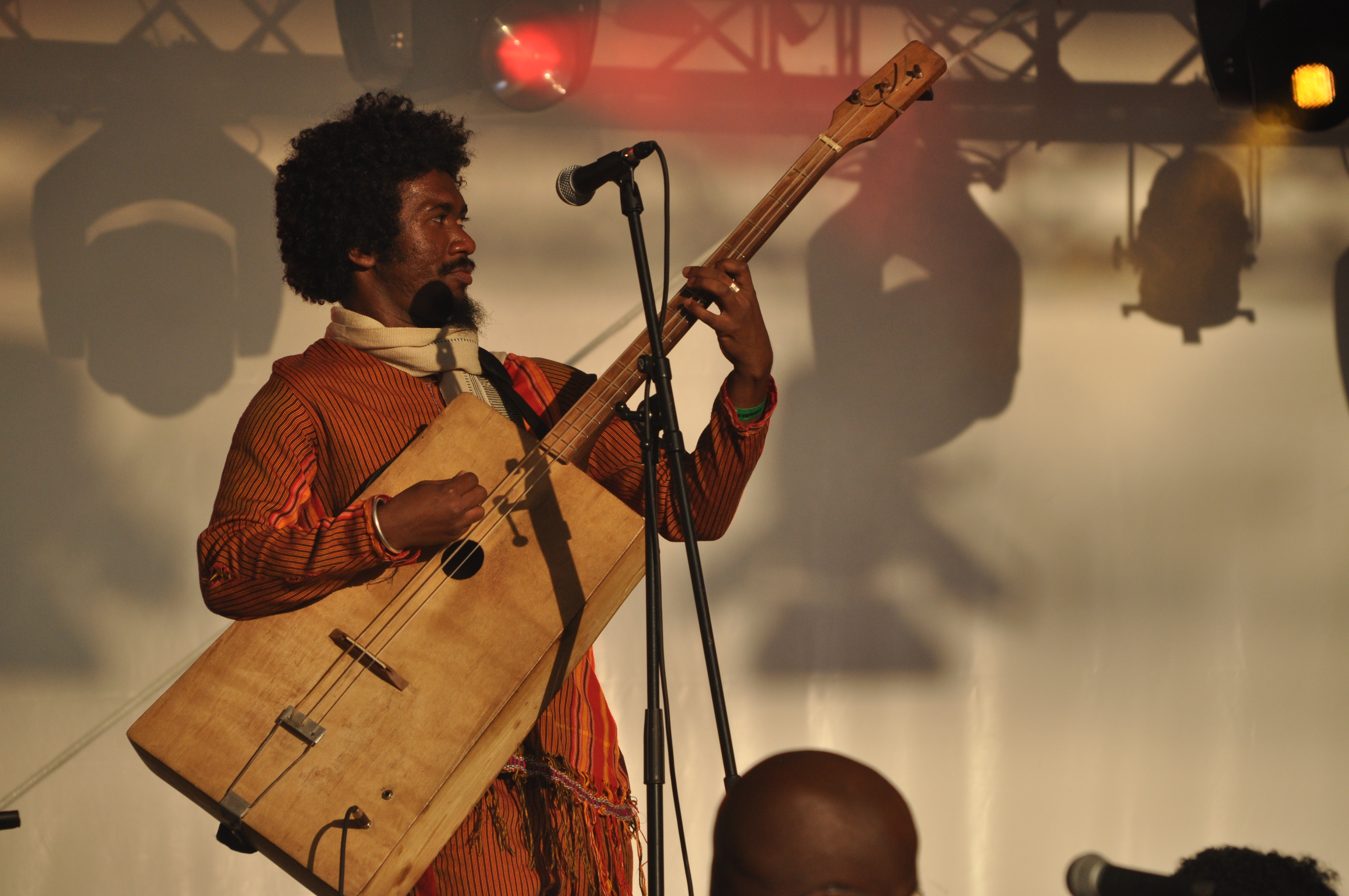
Madagascar, 2013. Musician playing a kabosy.

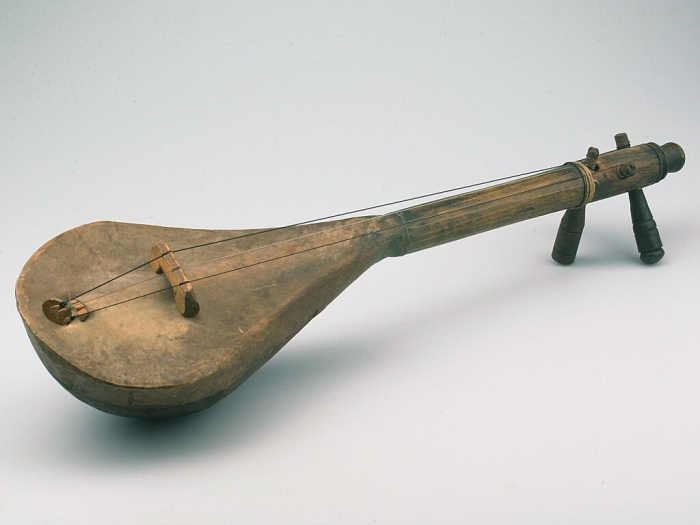
Morocco, pre-1981, skin-topped lute, carved wooden bowl, Amazigh, Amazighen, Berber cultures. Called "Lothar". Labeled "Gimbrī" in Koptishe Lauten (Ricardo Eichmann, 1994, page 101)

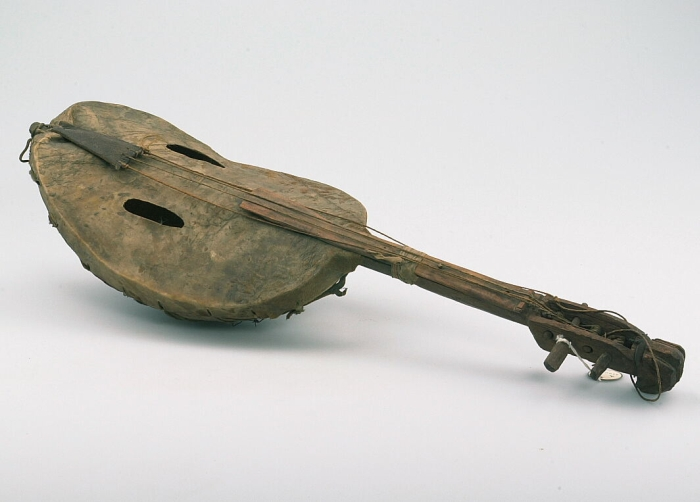
West Africa, pre-1887, skin-topped lute, calabash bowl, has sound holes

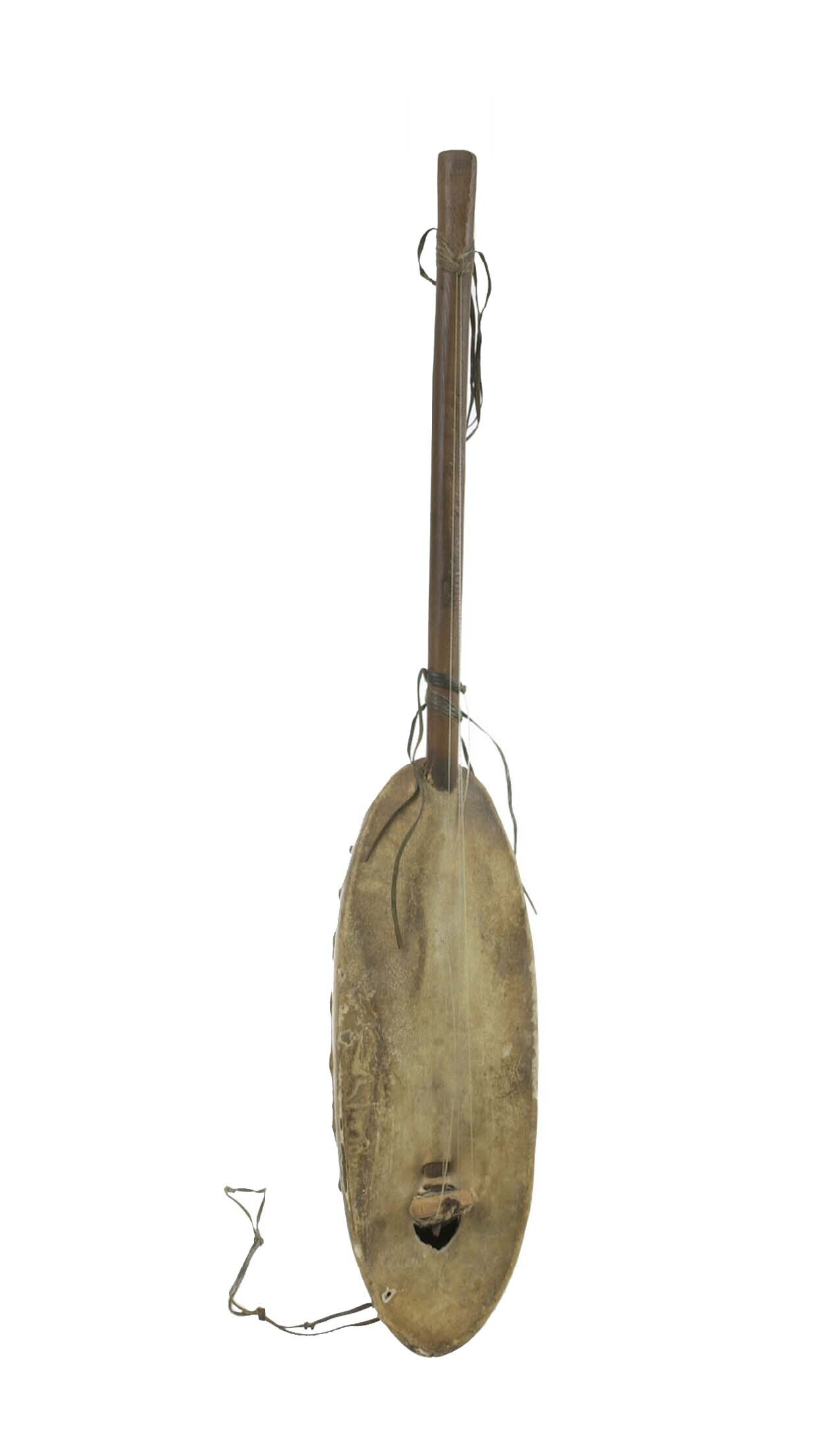
Mali, pre-1970, skin-topped lute, carved wooden bowl, Fellani, Foulah, Ful, Fulani, Fulbe, Peul, Toucouleur cultures, called "Hoddu"

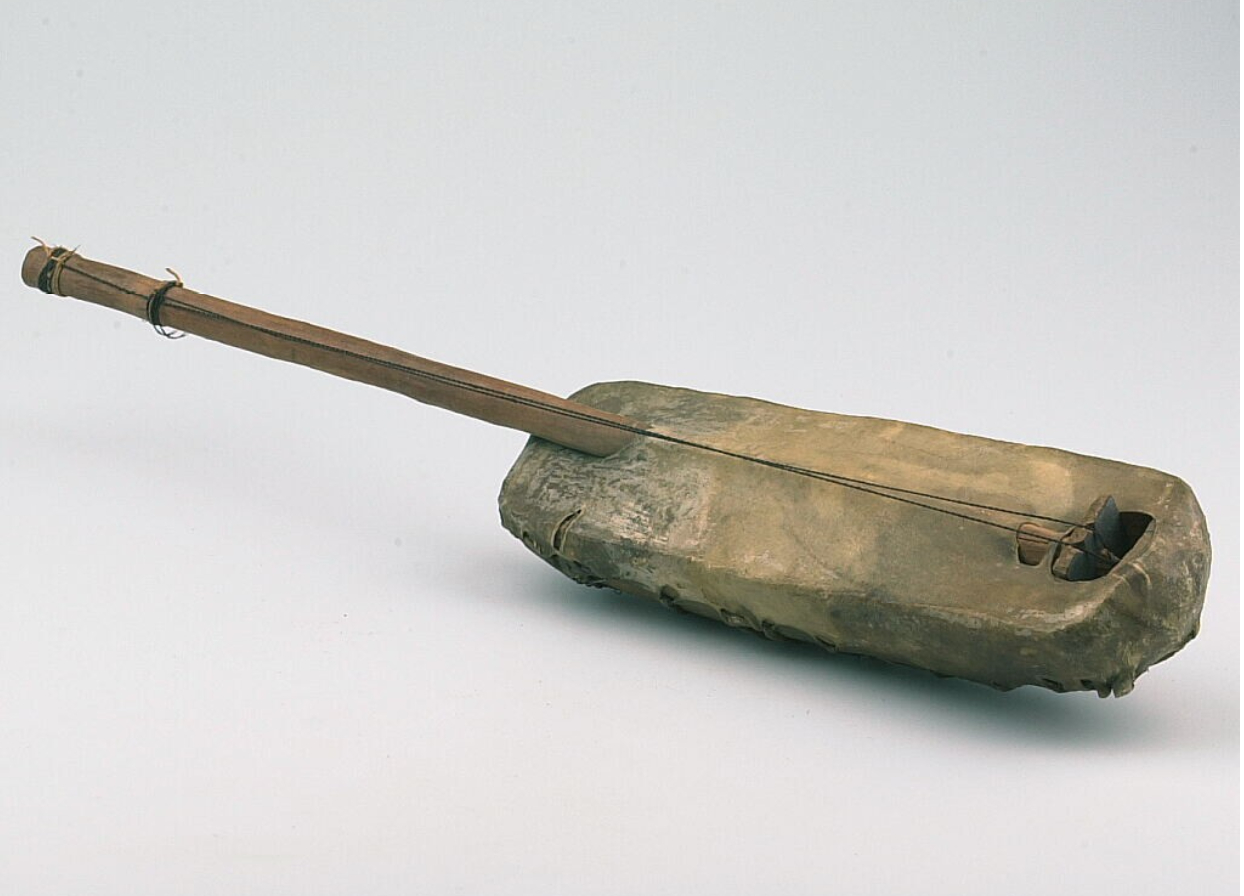
Africa, pre-1953, skin-topped lute, carved wooden bowl

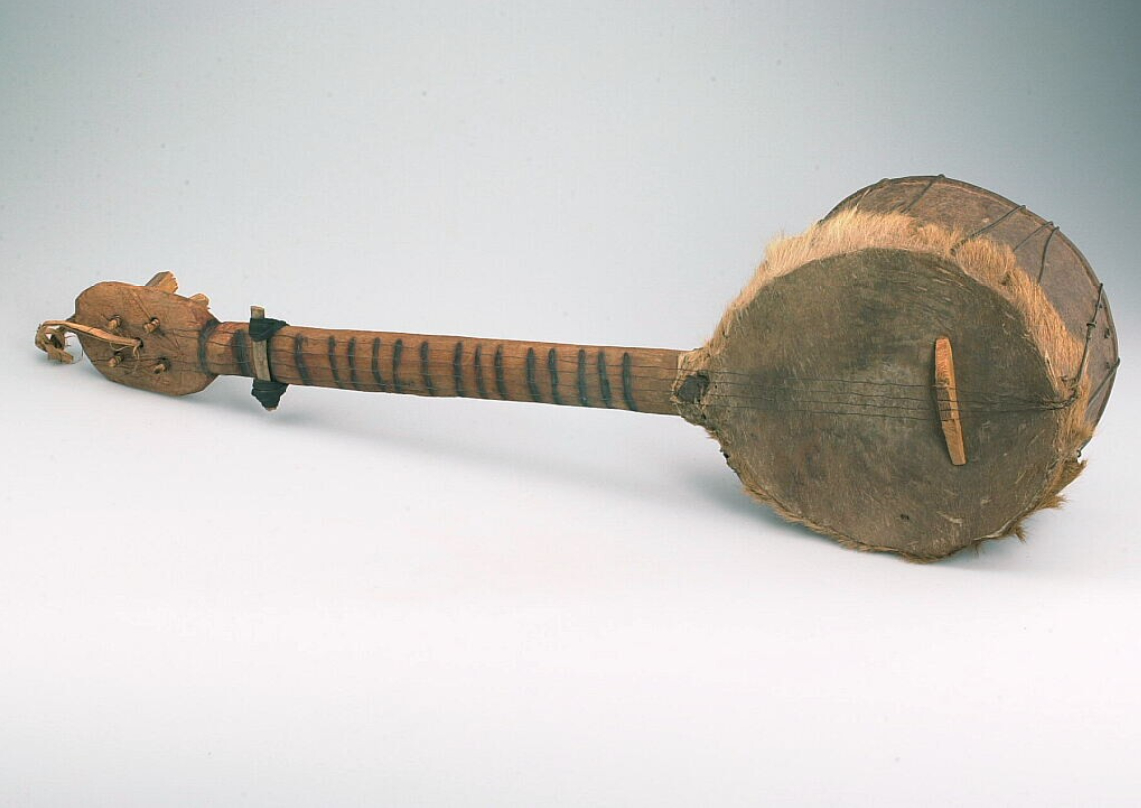
Ramkie. Rhodesia-Zambia, skin topped lute or banjo, metal can for body, Kaonde culture

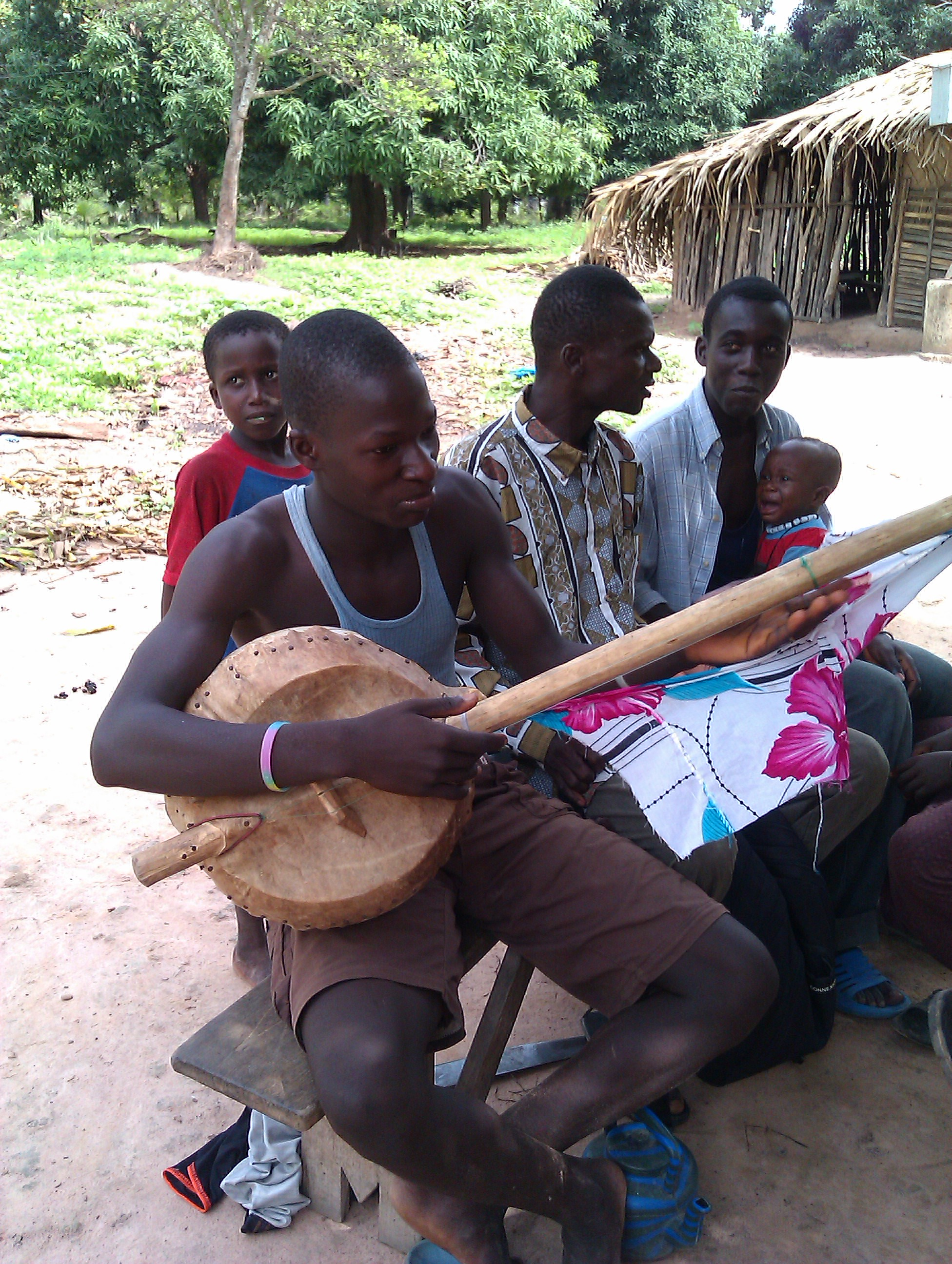
Senegal, akonting. Possibly related to banjo.

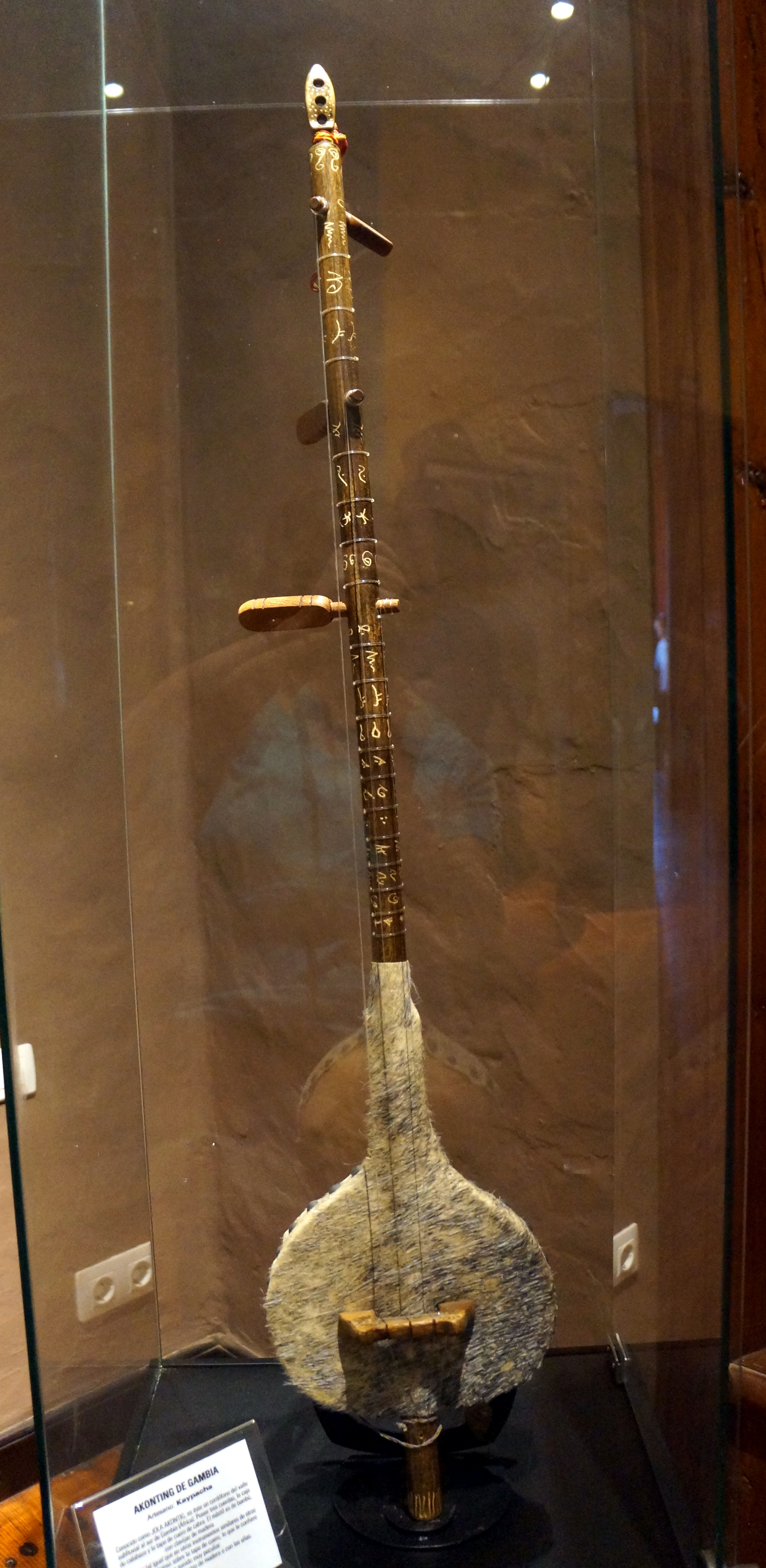
Gambia, akonting with pegs

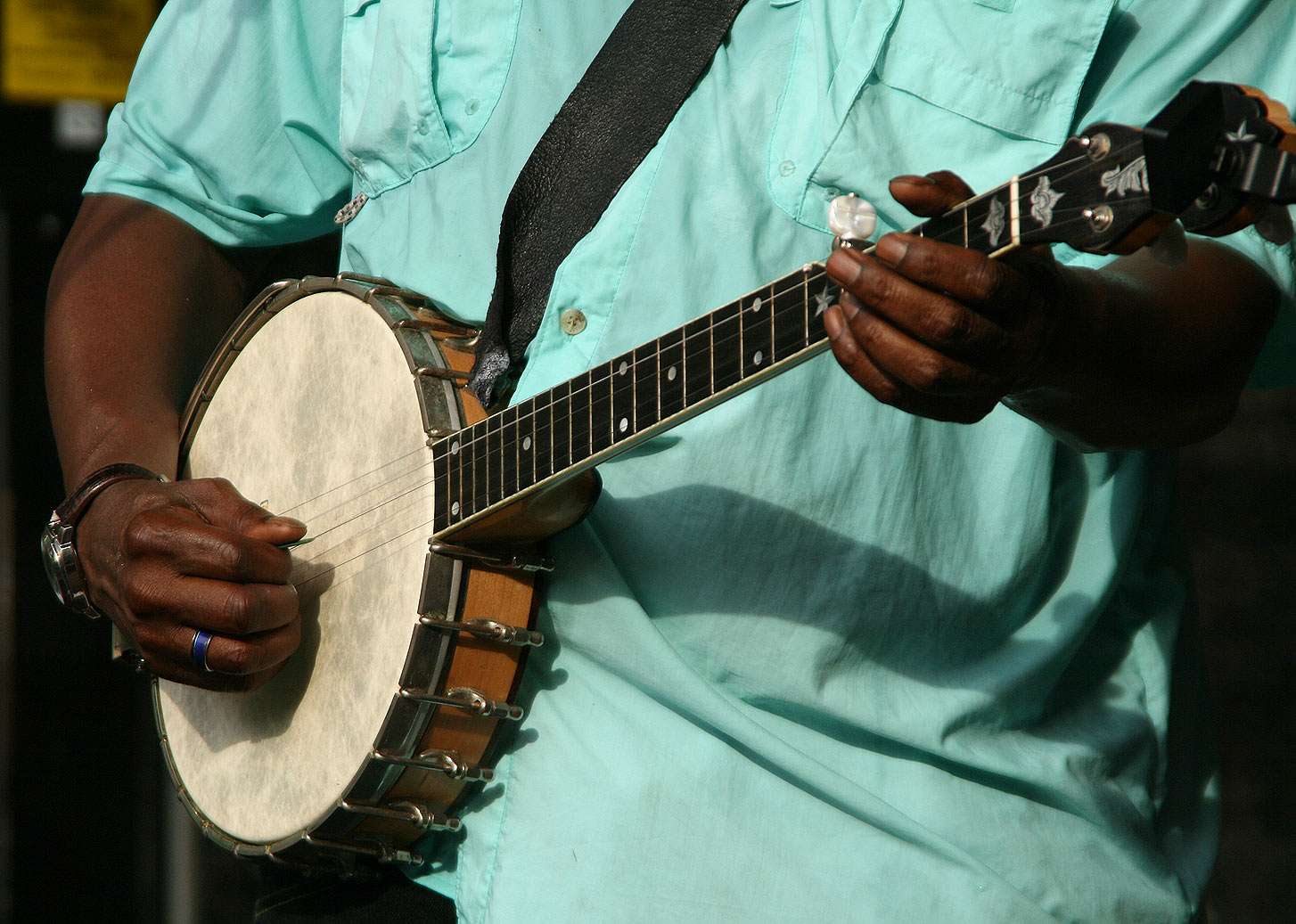
United States. Banjo in the hands of Taj Mahal.

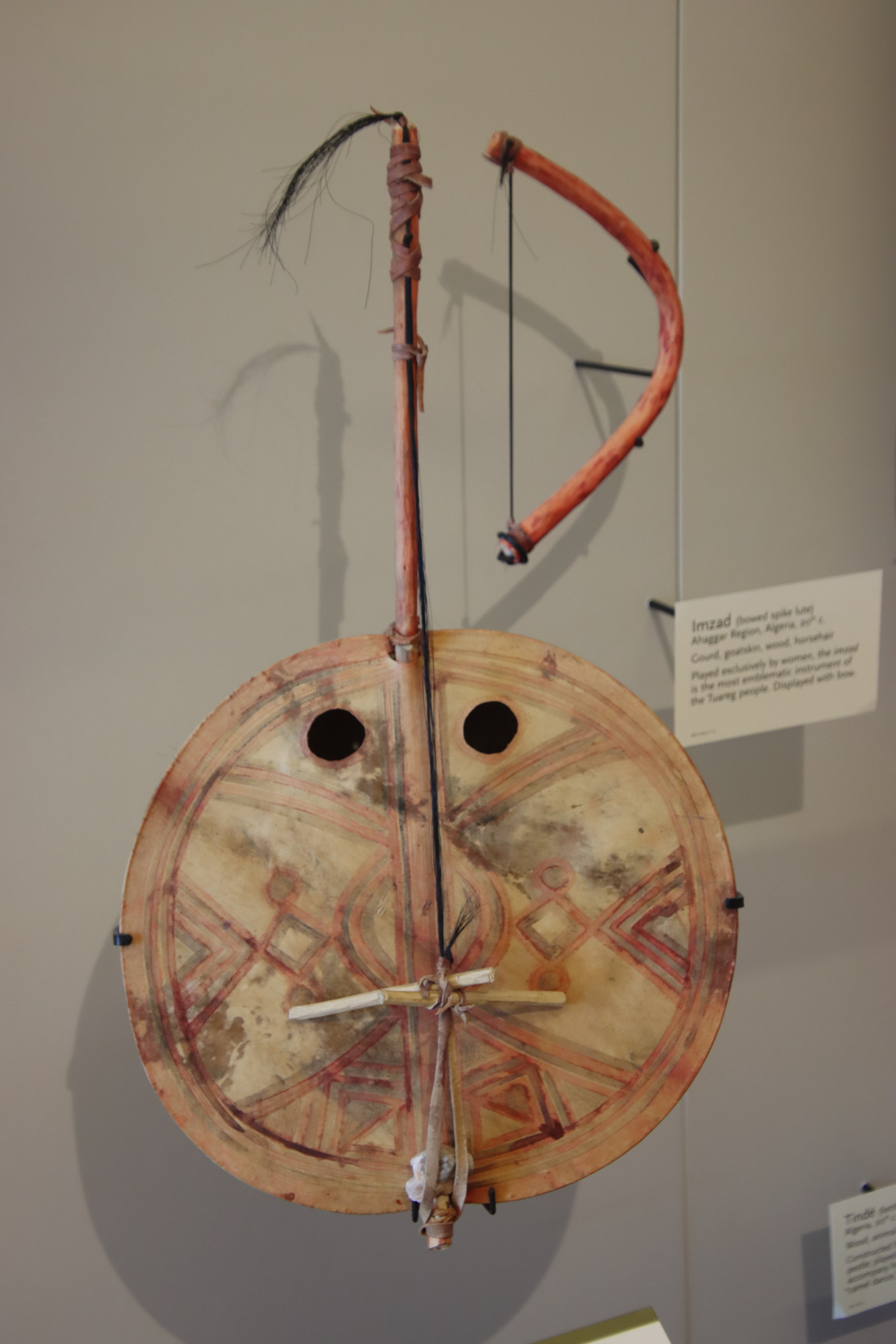
Algeria. Tuareg people. Imzad bowed lute.

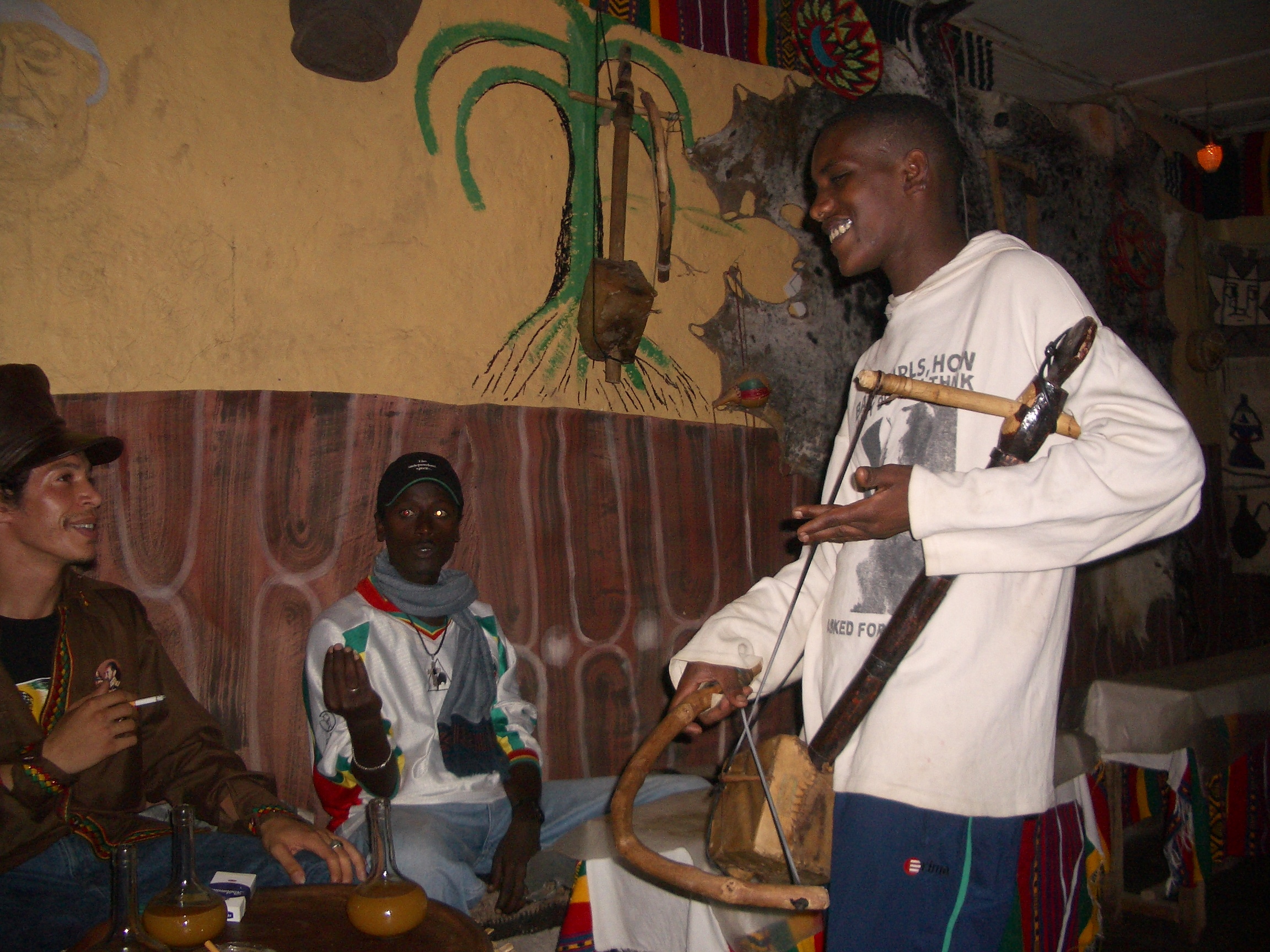
Lalibela, Ethiopia, 2005. An azmari (minstrel) plays a manenqo, bowed lute.

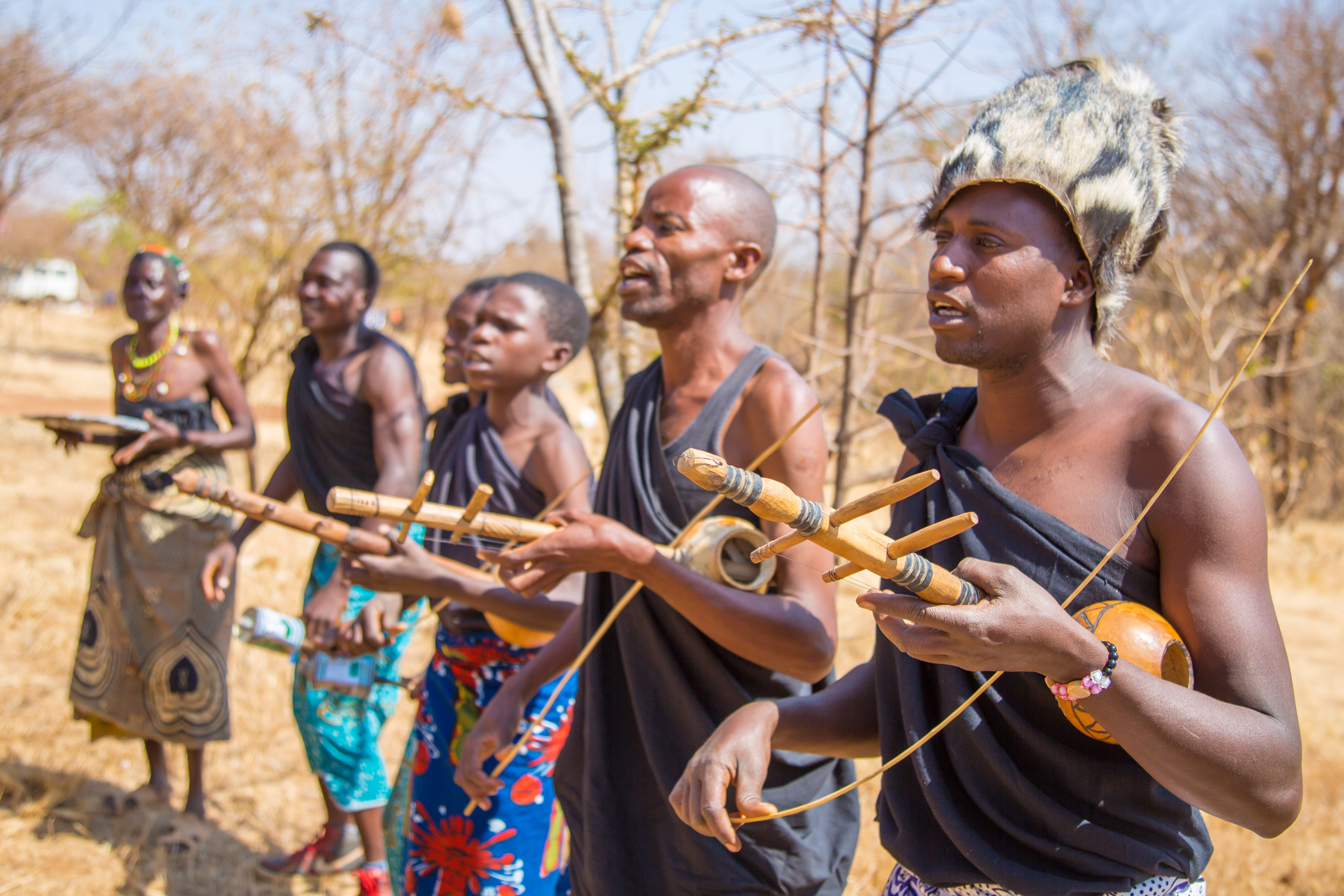
Tanzania, 2016. A line of musicians play the zeze, bowed with a stick.

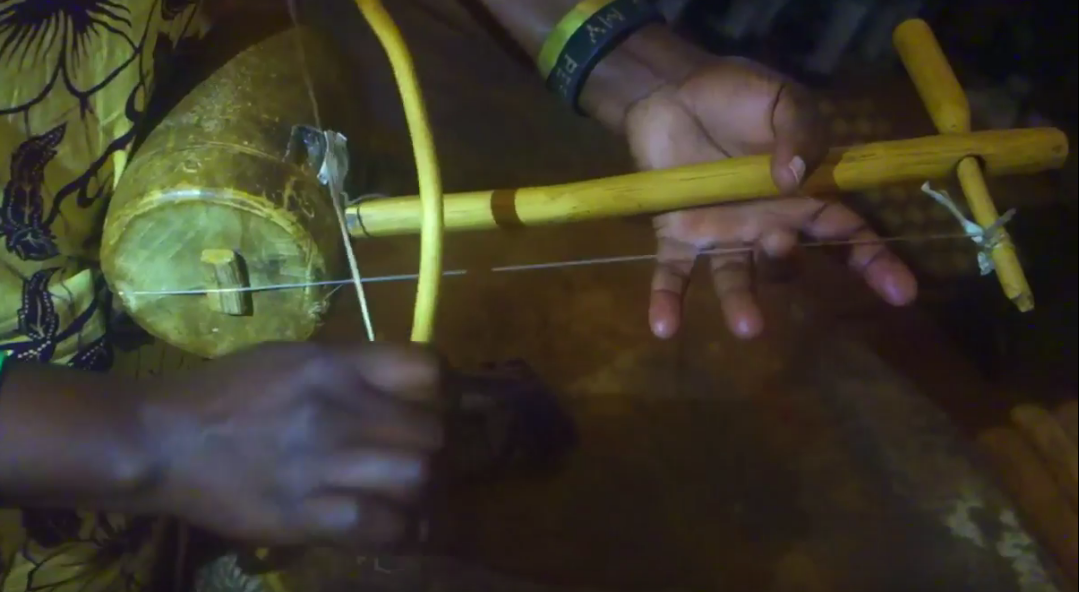
Uganda, 2017. Endingidi bowed lute.

== European lutes ==
=== Lute ===
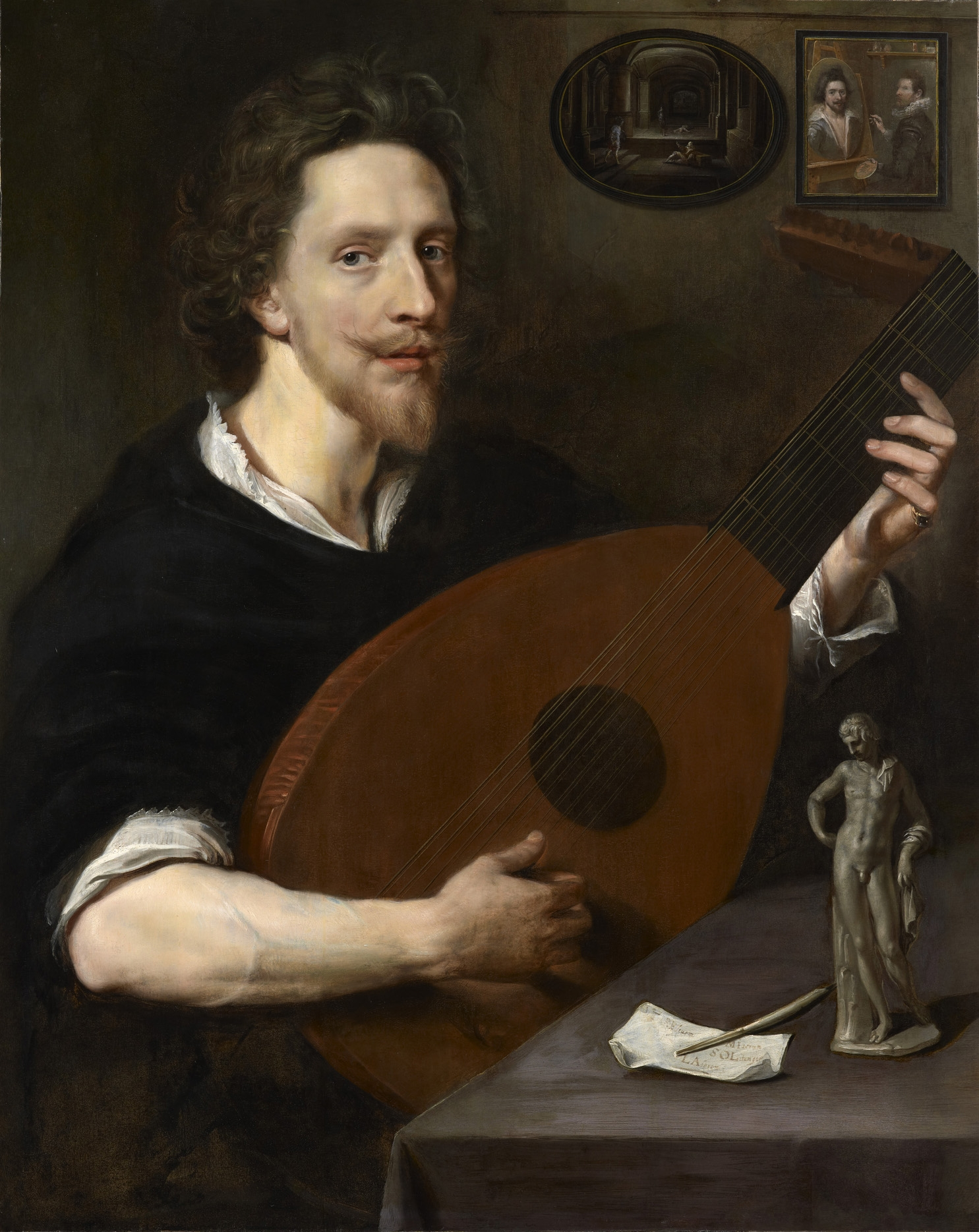
Nicholas Lanier, 1613

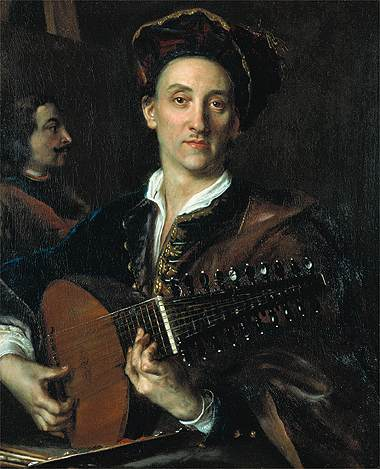
David Hoyer, an artist from Leipzig, painted by Jan Kupetzky, c. 1711.

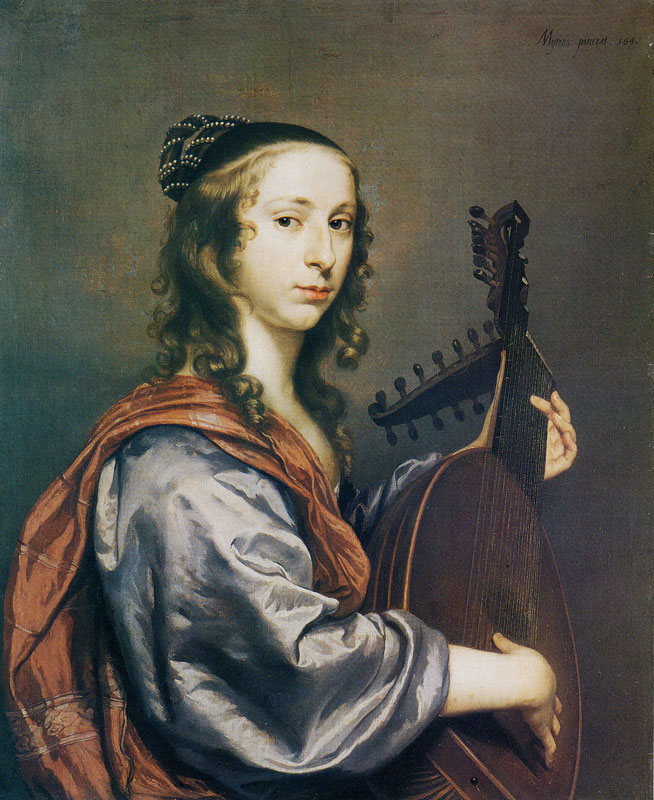
Theorbo-lute hybrid. From the 1648 painting A Lady Playing a Lute by Jan Mijtens.

Portraits of Early modern or Renaissance people, posing with lutes.

See Lute, History and Evolution

The European lute and the modern Near-Eastern oud descend from a common ancestor via diverging evolutionary paths. The lute is used in a great variety of instrumental music from the Medieval to the late Baroque eras and was the most important instrument for secular music in the Renaissance. During the Baroque music era, the lute was used as one of the instruments which played the basso continuo accompaniment parts. It is also an accompanying instrument in vocal works. The lute player either improvises ("realizes") a chordal accompaniment based on the figured bass part, or plays a written-out accompaniment (both music notation and tabulature ("tab") are used for lute). As a small instrument, the lute produces a relatively quiet sound.

Medieval lutes were 4- or 5-course instruments, plucked using a quill as a plectrum. There were several sizes, and by the end of the Renaissance, seven different sizes (up to the great octave bass) are documented. Song accompaniment was probably the lute's primary function in the Middle Ages, but very little music securely attributable to the lute survives from the era before 1500. Medieval and early-Renaissance song accompaniments were probably mostly improvised, hence the lack of written records.

In the last few decades of the 15th century, to play Renaissance polyphony on a single instrument, lutenists gradually abandoned the quill in favor of plucking the instrument with the fingertips. The number of courses grew to six and beyond. The lute was the premier solo instrument of the 16th century, but continued to accompany singers as well.

By the end of the Renaissance the number of courses had grown to ten, and during the Baroque era the number continued to grow until it reached 14 (and occasionally as many as 19). These instruments, with up to 26–35 strings, required innovations in the structure of the lute. At the end of the lute's evolution the archlute, theorbo and torban had long extensions attached to the main tuning head to provide a greater resonating length for the bass strings, and since human fingers are not long enough to stop strings across a neck wide enough to hold 14 courses, the bass strings were placed outside the fretboard, and were played open, i.e., without pressing them against the fingerboard with the left hand.

Over the course of the Baroque era the lute was increasingly relegated to the continuo accompaniment, and was eventually superseded in that role by keyboard instruments. The lute almost fell out of use after 1800. Some sorts of lute were still used for some time in Germany, Sweden, Ukraine.

=== Bowed fiddles, lyra, kamānģa rūmī, vièla, viola ===
Bowed

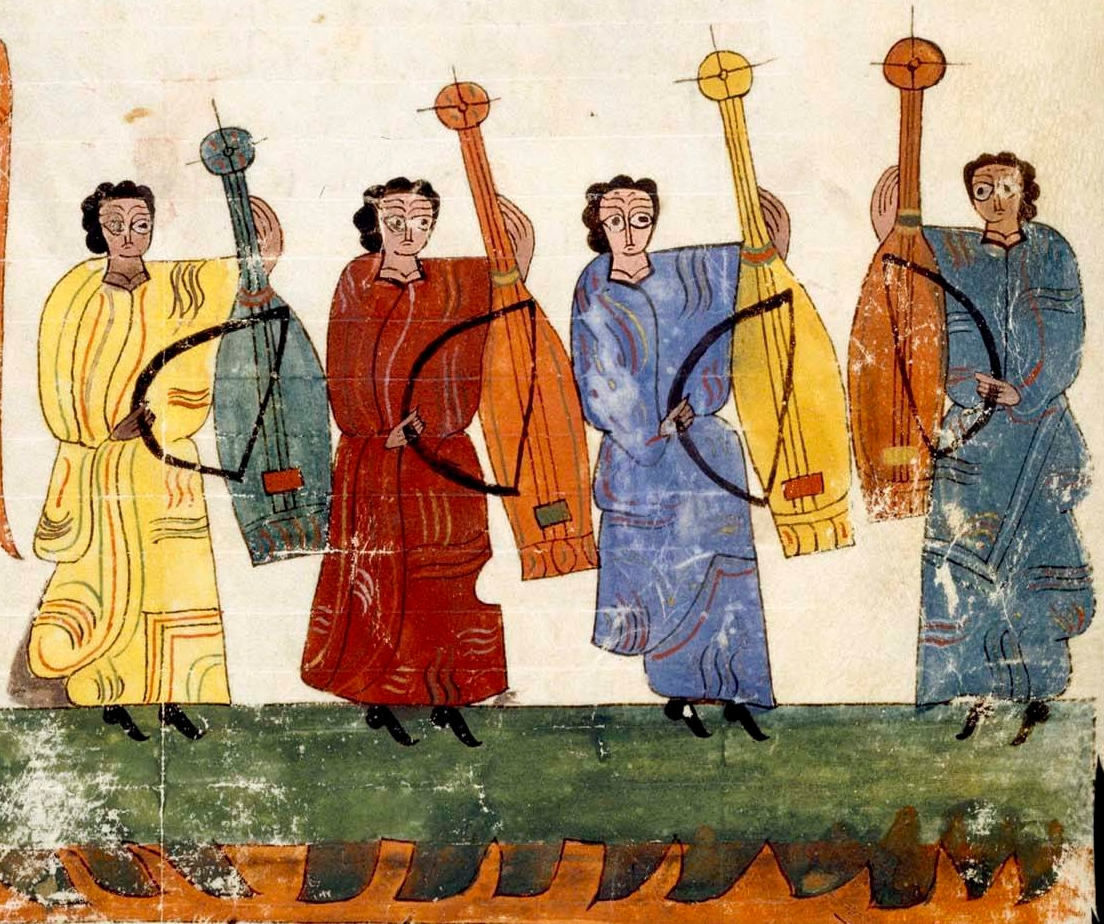
Spain, "second third of 10th century". Violas de arco played with a bow. From Commentary on the Apocalypse, Codice VITR 14.1.

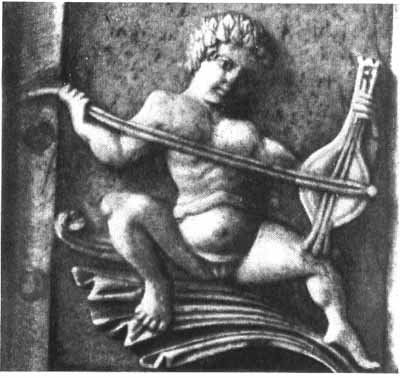
Earliest known depiction of lyra in a Byzantine ivory casket (900 – 1100 AD). (Museo Nazionale, Florence)

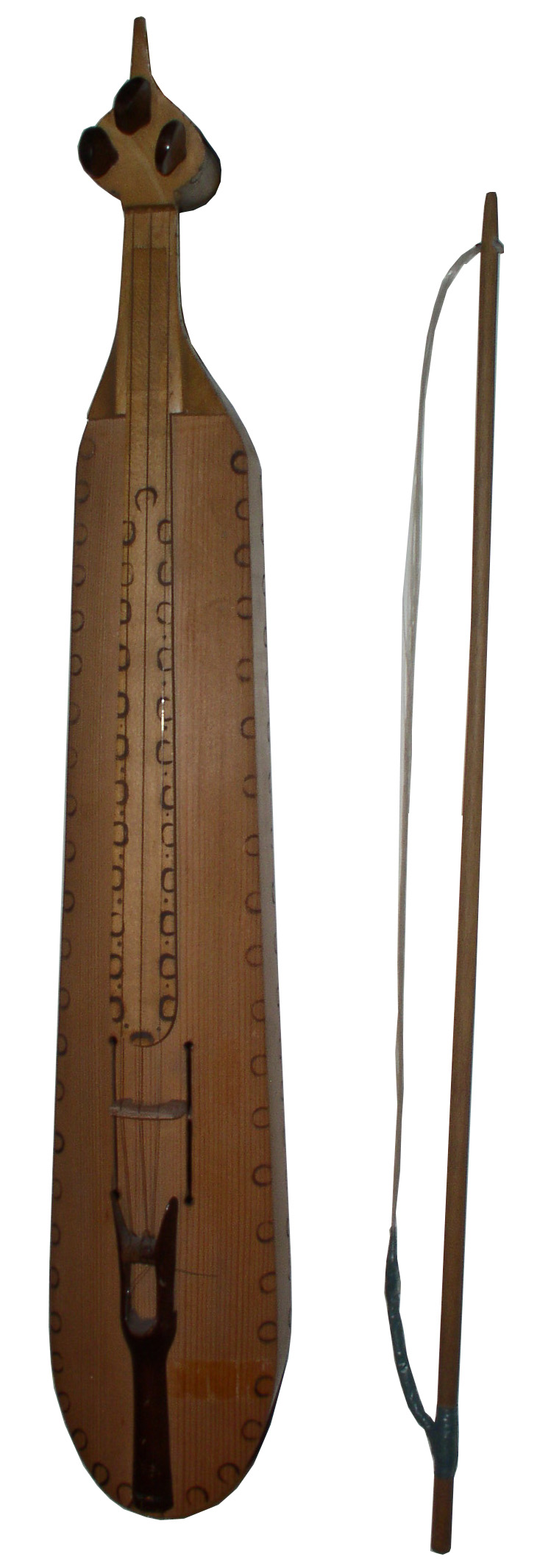
Kemençe of the Black Sea

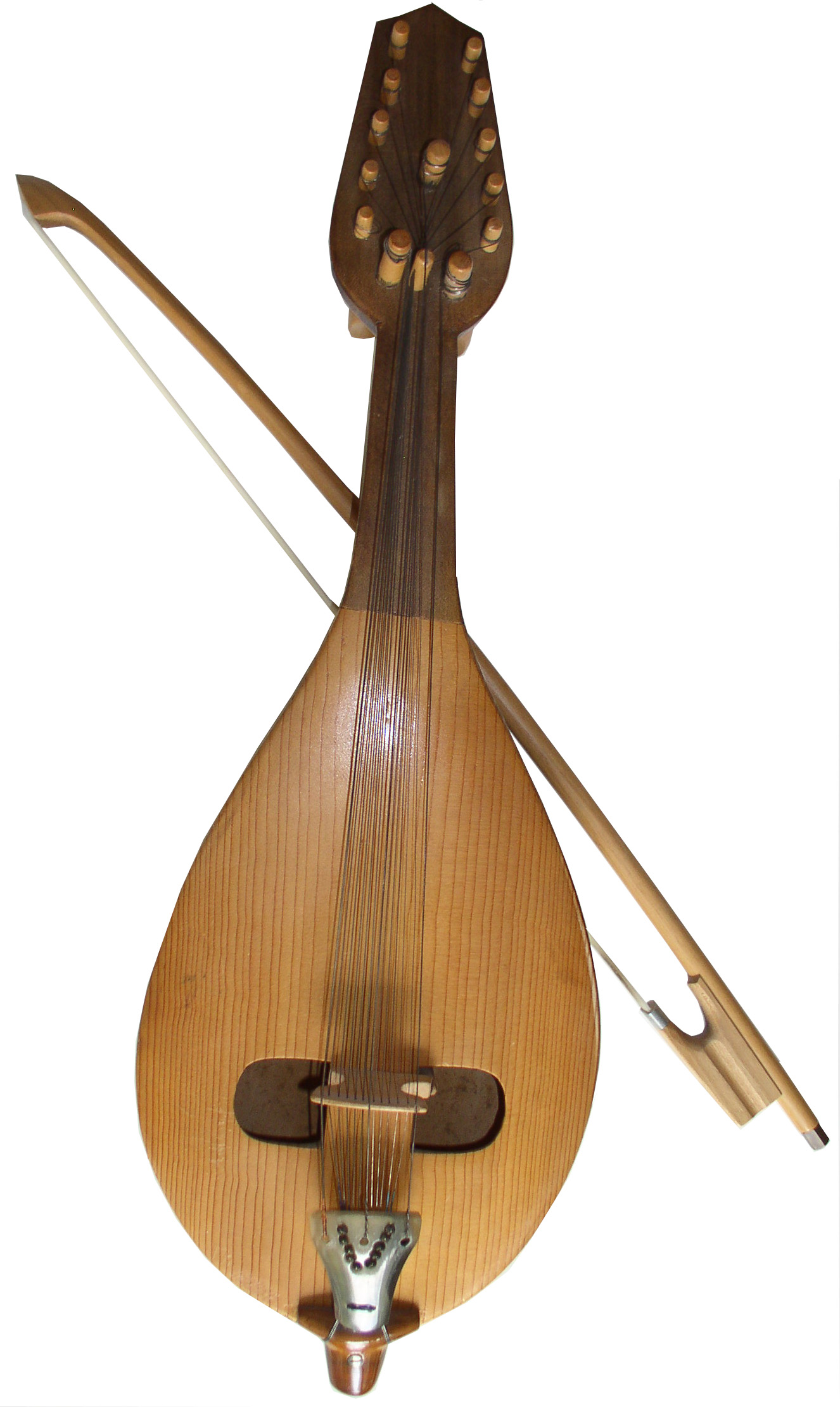
Bulgarian Gdulka with bow

Spain had bowed instruments as early as the 10th and 11th centuries AD, when they were included in Spanish manuscripts, such as the Commentary on the Apocalypse Beatus of Liébana Emilianense Codex.

The Byzantines had a bowed lute called a "kamānģa rūmī" in the east, also known as the Byzantine lira in "Greece, Bulgaria and Yugoslavia". The instrument still has a presence in the Eastern Mediterranean, in Southern Italy as the Calabrian lira, in Bulgaria as the gadulka, in Greece, Iran, Turkey, Armenia, and regions adjacent to the Black Sea the kemenche, in Dalmatia as the lijerica.

Sachs said that the Byzantine lyra would become the main bowed instrument in Europe, eventually becoming the "fiddle, vièle, [and] viola". The rebec also had a presence in Europe, but was not derived from the lyra but from the rabâb.

=== Cythara, a European lute-building tradition? ===
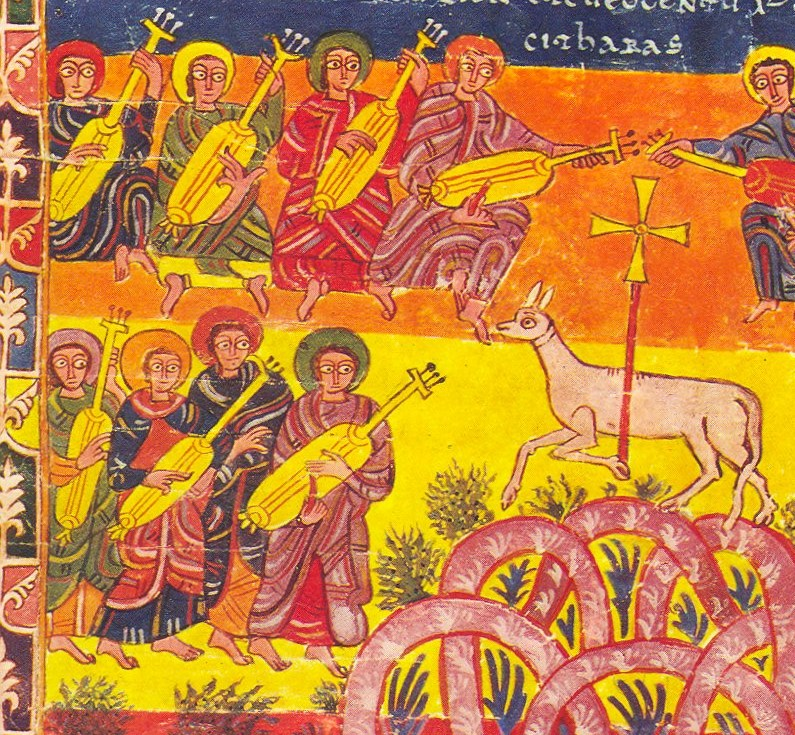
Spain, 962 AD, Morgan Beatus. Instruments labeled "citharas" in the medieval manuscript.

The word cythara was used generically for a wide variety stringed instruments of medieval and Renaissance Europe, including not only the lyre and harp but also necked, string instruments. In fact, unless a medieval document gives an indication that it meant a necked instrument, then it likely was referring to a lyre. It was also spelled cithara or kithara and was Latin for the Greek lyre. However, lacking names for some stringed instruments from the medieval period, these have been referred to as fiddles and citharas/cytharas, both by medieval people and by modern researchers. The instruments are important as being ancestors to or influential in the development of a wide variety of European instruments, including fiddles, vielles, violas, citoles, guitars. Although not proven to be completely separate from the line of lute-family instruments that dominated Europe (lute, oud, gittern, mandore), arguments have been made that they represent a European-based tradition of instrument building, which was for a time separate from the lute-family instruments.

==== Gallery: Europe, lutes of unknown development lines ====
Images showing instruments that have been labeled "cythara" in the medieval documents that they came from. Their lineage is not clearly understood. The Rylands Beatus instruments come from Spain, and may link to the Arabian/Muslim traditions of instrument making there, or be a form of plucked-fiddle, similar to those seen in Central Asia (an area that the Persians and Arabs conquered and picked up musical traditions from.)

The traditions of other cytharas are less understood and may represent a time of European experimentation, in which the cithara-lyre was transformed into the cythara-lute.

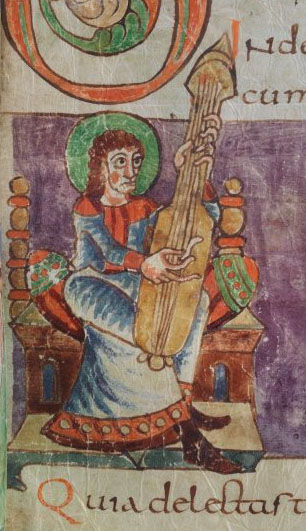
Stuttgart Psalter, 820–830 AD, cythara

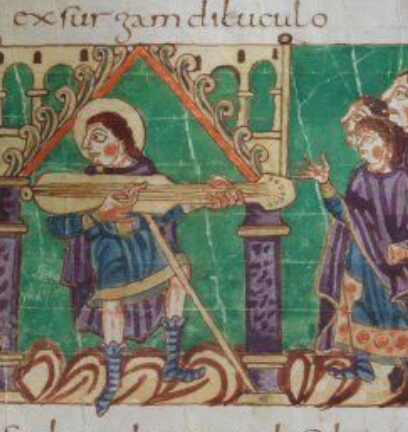
Stuttgart Psalter, 820–830 AD, cythara

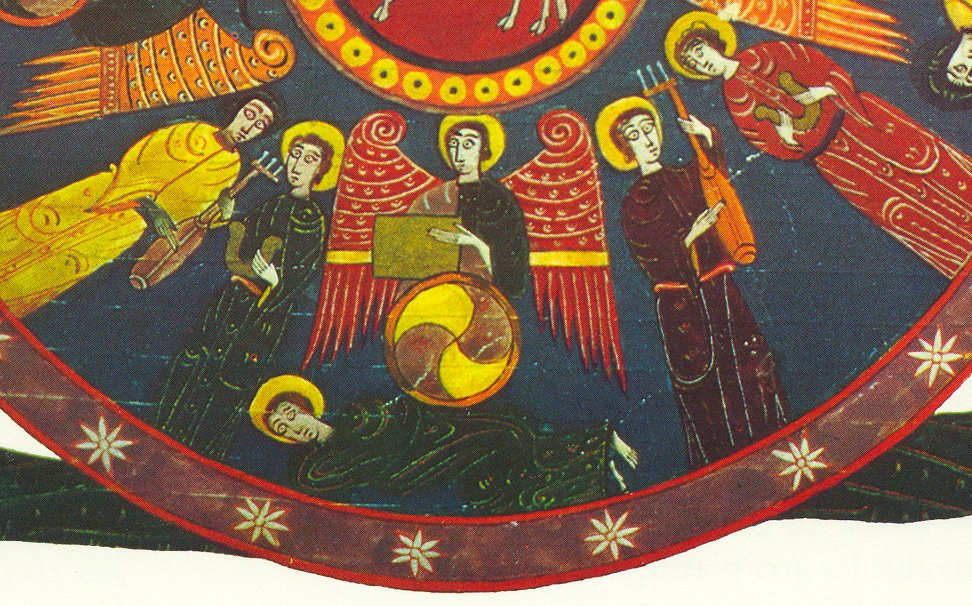
Beatus of Liébana, Ms. Vitr. 14.2, 1047 AD, angels holding cytharas

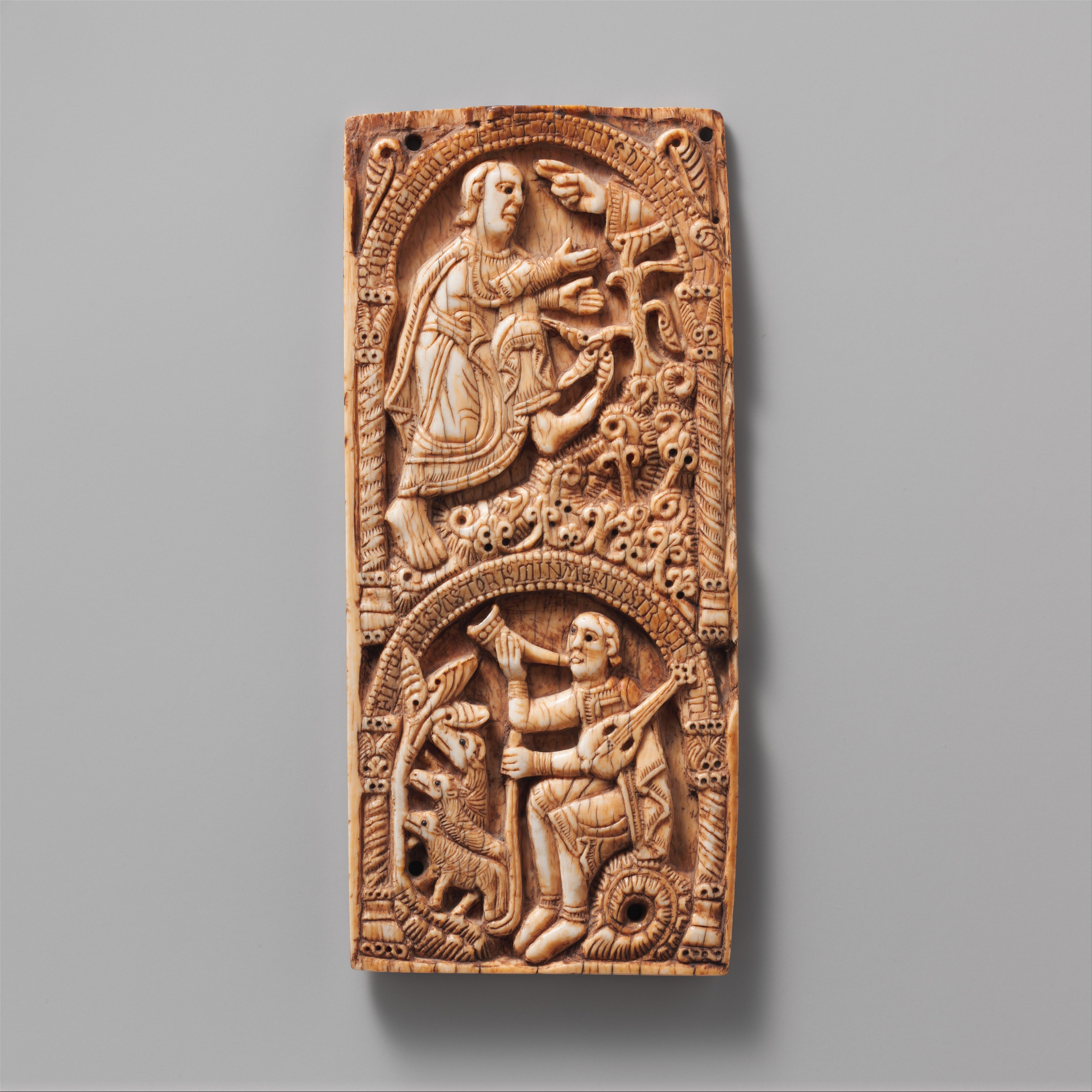
1060–80, Spain. Panel depicting Saint Aemilian of Cogolla with a three-stringed lute; the body and neck bear resemblance to the pandura, the peghead to cythara.

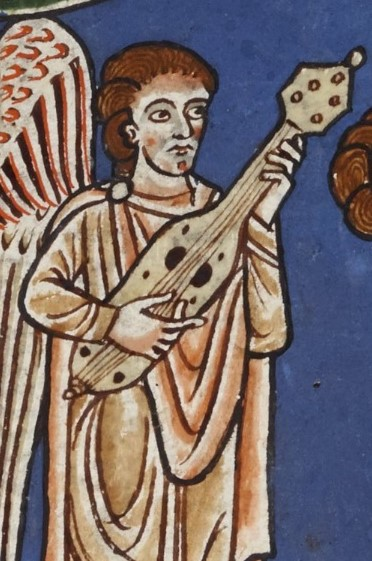
Rylands Beatus, c. 1175, cythara

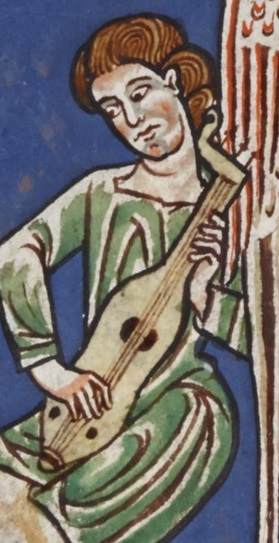
Rylands Beatus, c. 1175, cythara

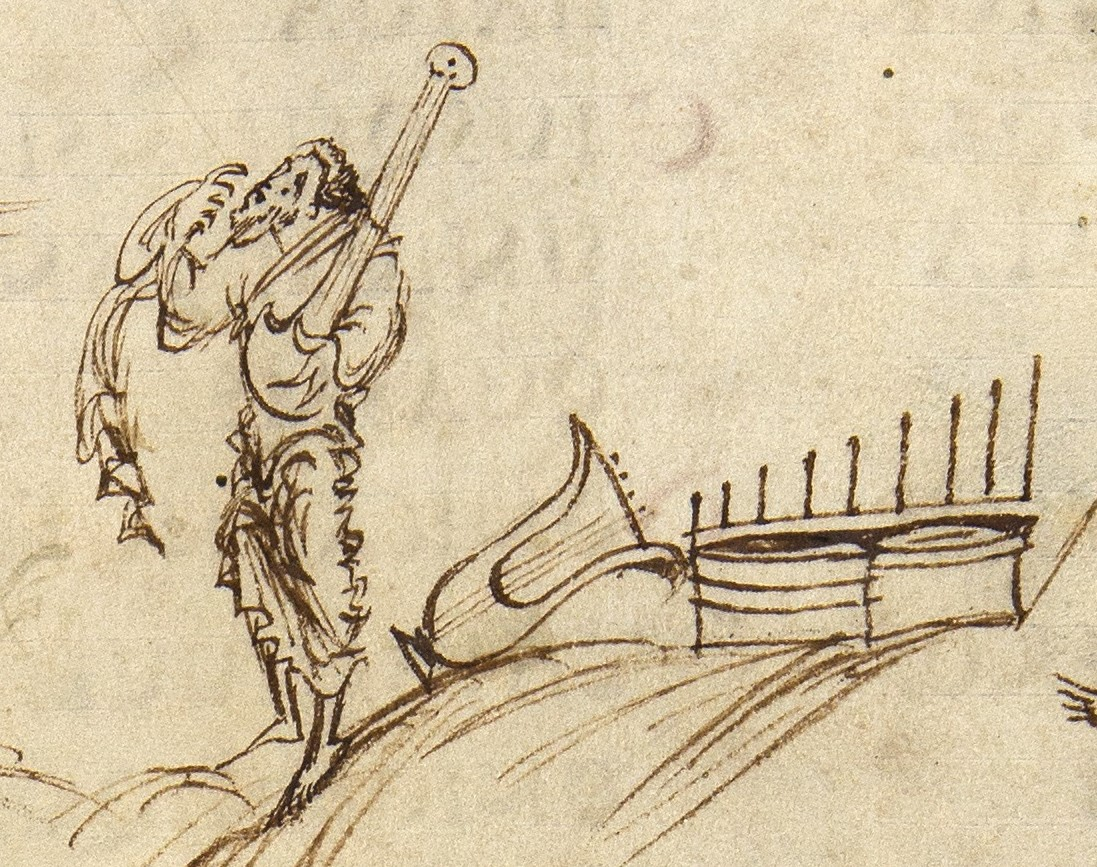
Utrecht Psalter, c. 850, cythara (held), cithara and organ (on ground)

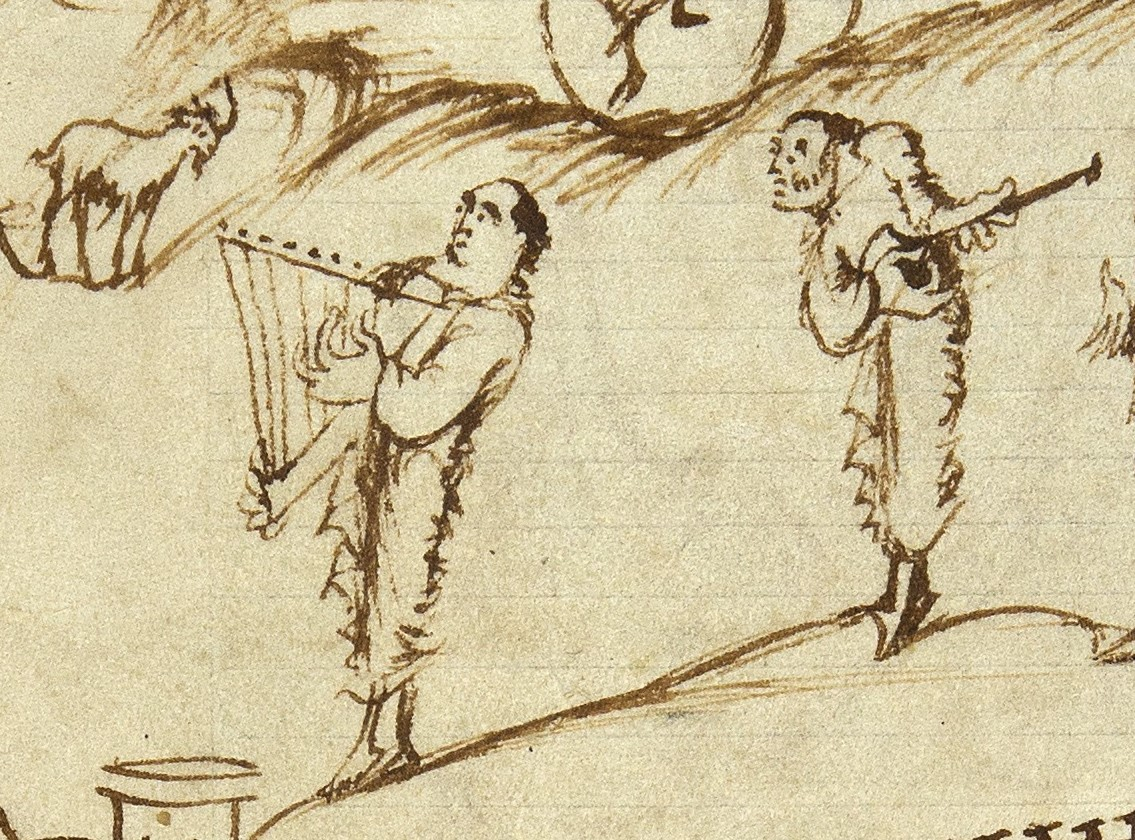
Utrecht Psalter, c. 850, cythara and harp

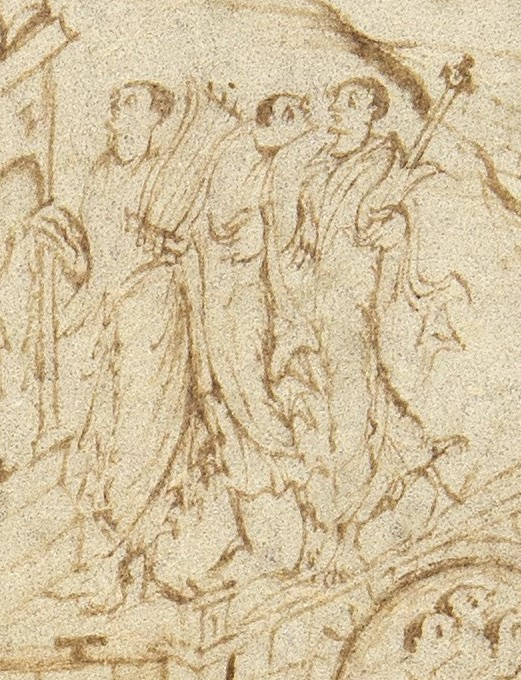
Utrecht Psalter, c. 850, cythara and lyre

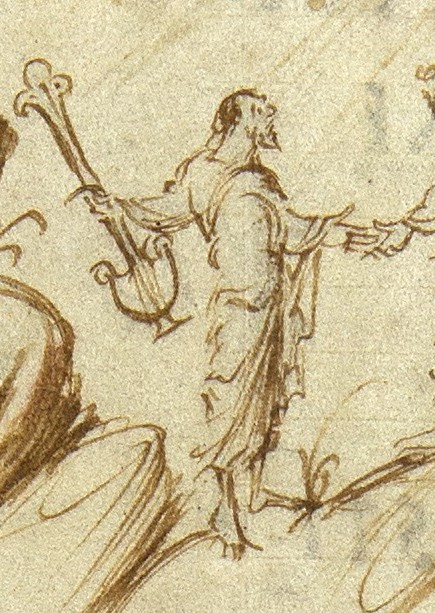
Utrecht Psalter, c. 850 cythara. Quoted text illustrated: "Confitebor tibi in cithara Deus Deus meus" (To thee, O God my God, I will give praise upon the cithara)

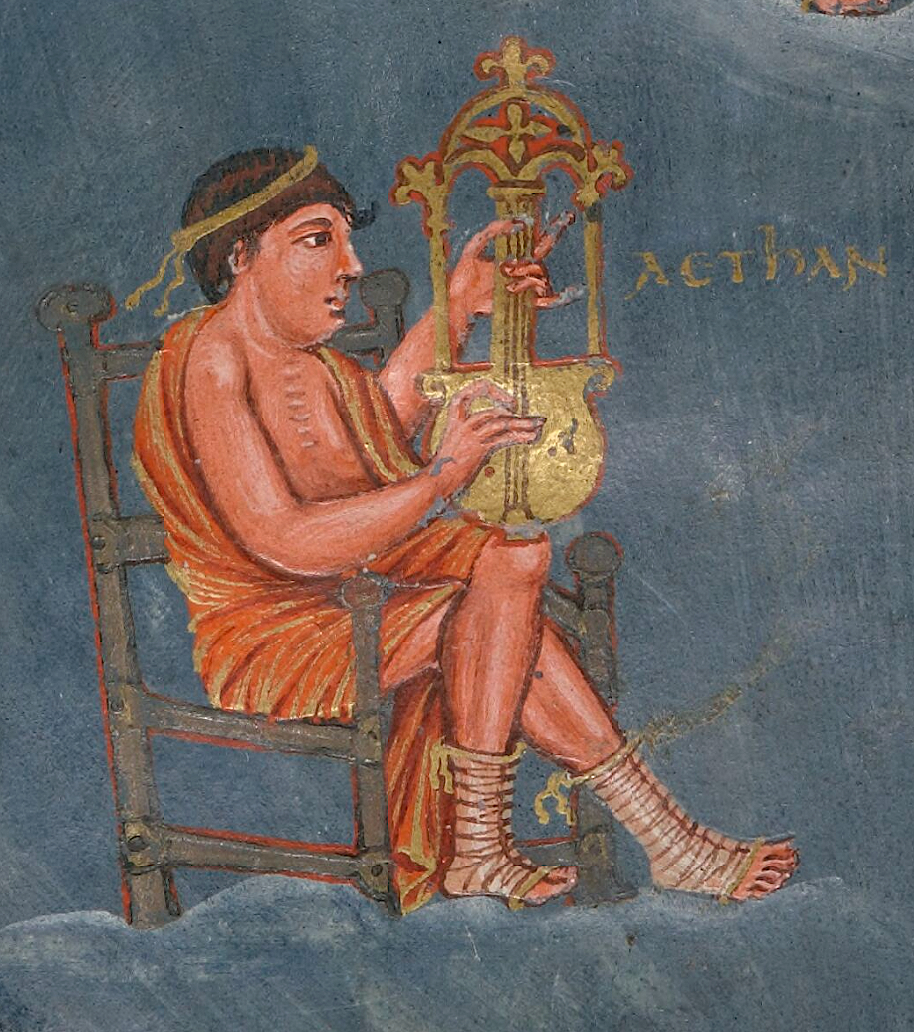
Bible of Charles the Bald, 9th century, cythara as lute or lyre combined, from the Bible of Charles the Bald, 9th century

=== Gittern and mandola ===
==== Gittern ====
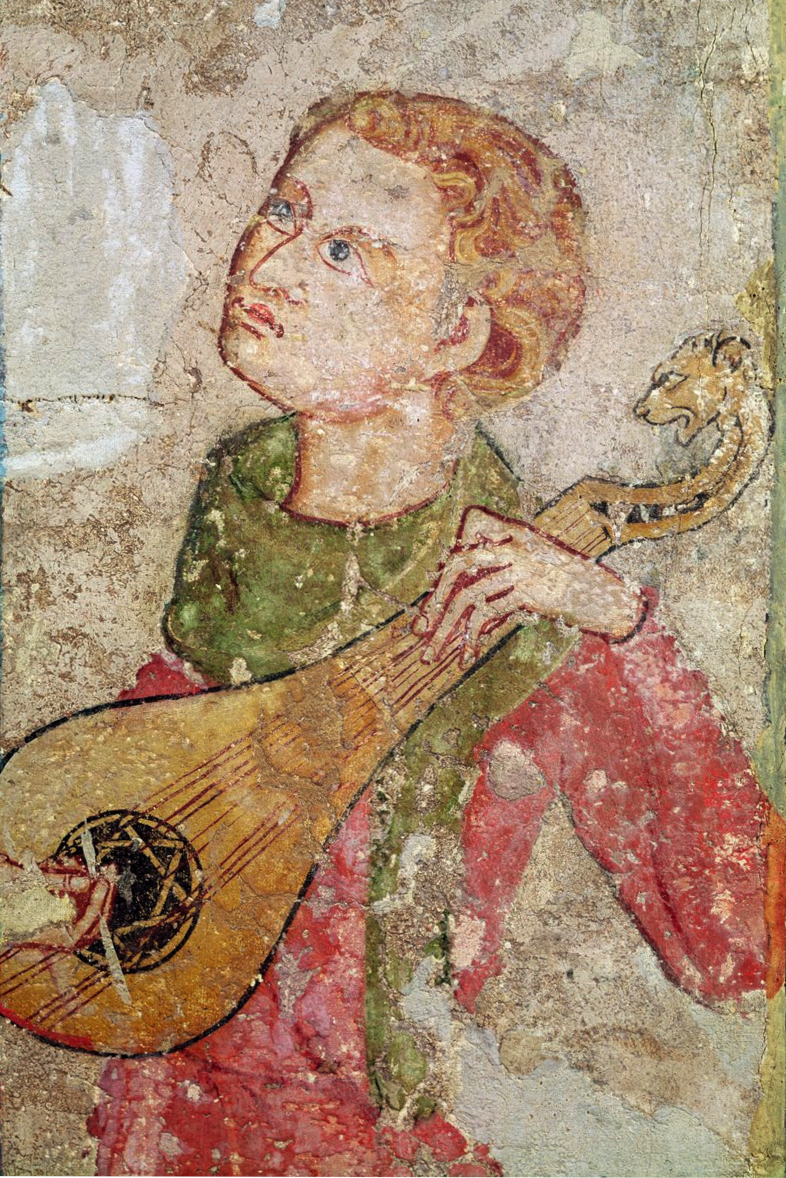
Juan Oliver's c.1330 painting at Pamplona Cathedral, showing a musician playing a gittern.

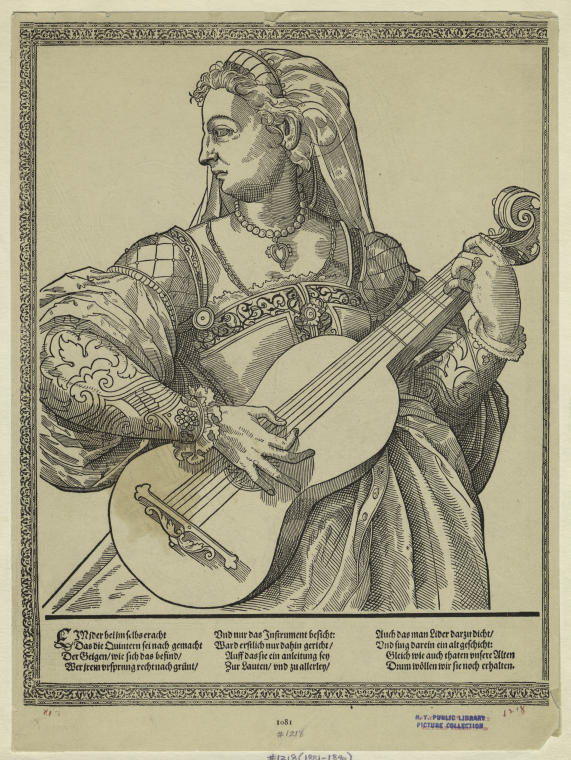
By 1570 the German quinterne resembled the European 4-course guitar, including how it was strung.

The gittern was a relatively small gut strung round-backed instrument that first appears in literature and pictorial representation during the 13th century in Western Europe (Iberian Peninsula, Italy, France, England). It is usually depicted played with a quill plectrum, as we can see clearly beginning in manuscript illuminations from the 13th century.

It was also called the guitarra in Spain, guiterne or guiterre in France, the chitarra in Italy and quintern in Germany. A popular instrument with court musicians, minstrels, and amateurs, the gittern is considered ancestral to the modern guitar and possibly to other instruments like the mandore and gallichon.

From the early 16th century, a vihuela shaped (flat-backed) guitarra began to appear in Spain, and later in France, existing alongside the gittern. Although the round-backed instrument appears to have lost ground to the new from which gradually developed into the guitar familiar today, the influence of the earlier style continued. Examples of lutes converted into guitars exist in several museums, while purpose-built instruments like the gallichon utilised the tuning and single string configuration of the modern guitar. A tradition of building round-backed guitars in Germany continued to the 20th century with names like gittar-laute and Wandervogellaute.

==== Mandola or mandore ====
The mandore (or mandola in Italian) is a musical instrument, a small member of the lute family, teardrop shaped, with four to six courses of gut strings and pitched in the treble range. It was considered a new instrument in French music books from the 1580s, but is descended from and very similar to the gittern. It is considered ancestral to the modern mandolin. Other earlier instruments include the medieval European citole and the Greek and Byzantine pandura.

The history of modern mandolins, mandolas and guitars are all intertwined. The instruments shared common ancestor instruments. Some instruments became fashionable widely, and others locally. Experts argue as to the differences; because many of the instruments are so similar but not identical, classifying them has proven difficult

The Cantigas de Santa Maria shows 13th-century instruments similar to lutes, mandores, mandolas and guitars, being played by European and Islamic players. The instruments moved from Spain northward to France and eastward towards Italy by way of Provence.

Like the earlier gittern, the mandore's back and neck were in earlier forms carved out of a block of wood. This "hollowed out construction" did still exist in the 16th century, according to James Tyler, but was becoming rare. The method was being replaced by gluing curved staves together to form back, and adding a neck and peg box.

=== Moving toward the acoustic guitar ===
See: Classical guitar, history and Guitar, history

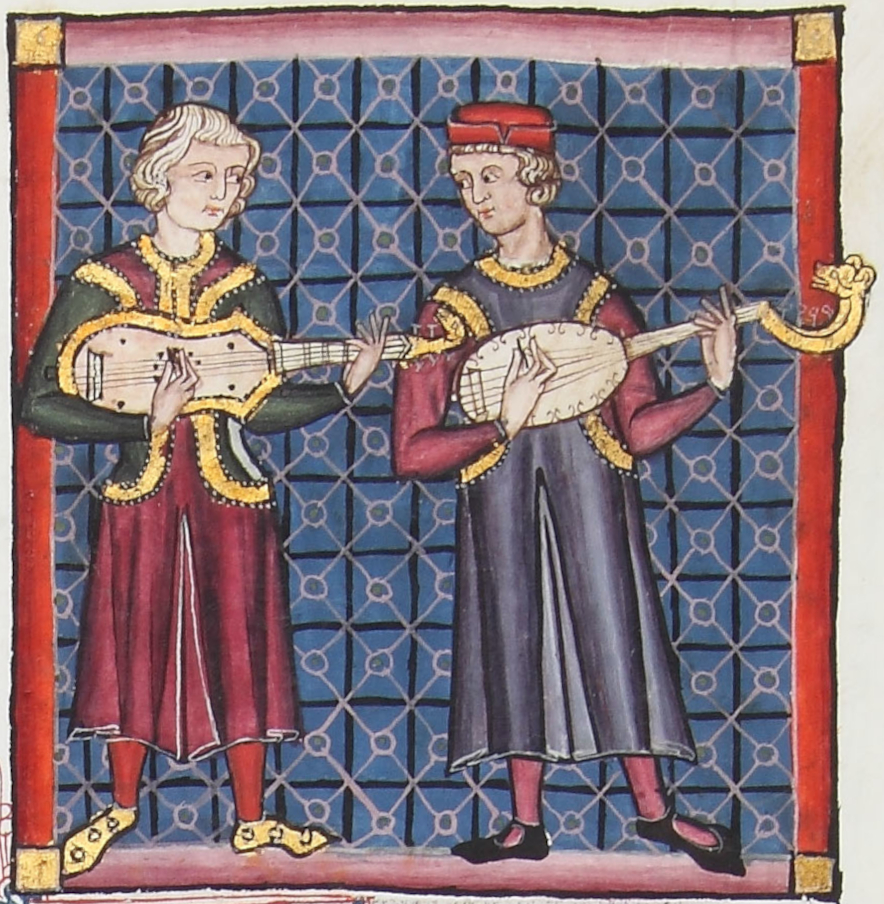
Photo from the Cantigas de Santa Maria, Castile/Spain, c. 1300–1340. The left instrument has been called both Guitarra latina and citole. The other instrument has been called guitarra morisca.

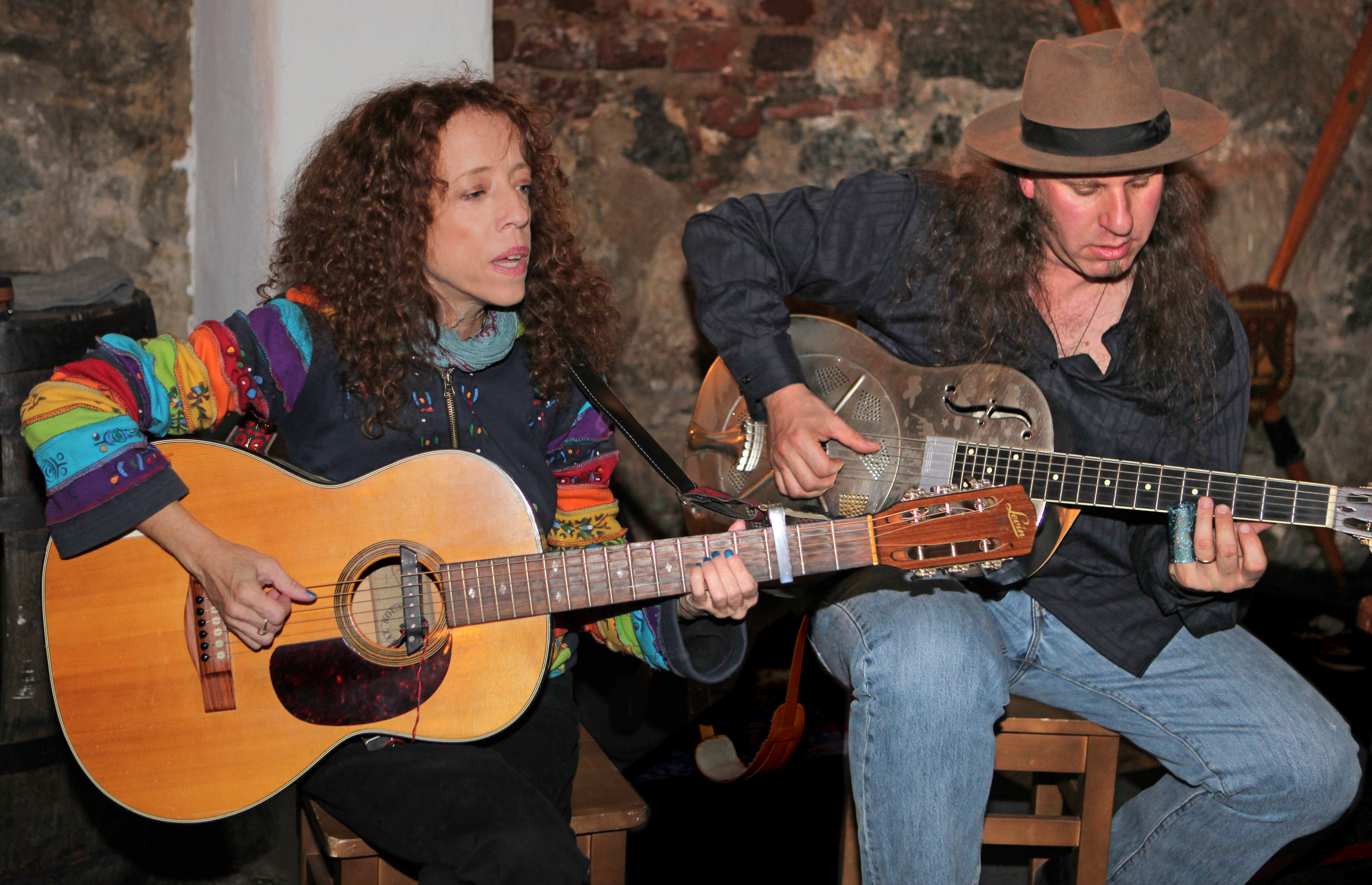
Modern guitars, acoustic (left), resonator guitar (right).

The modern acoustic guitar comes from a long evolution of stringed musical instruments. It has often been claimed that the guitar is a development of the medieval instrument vihuela as evolution of ancient lute.

Although the word guitar today indicates a specific musical instrument family, centered around the acoustic guitar, in the past it has been used in English about members of the cittern family as well, for example the English guitar and Portuguese guitar.

Further, the ancestor instrument of the citterns, the cytole, came from Spain during the period that one of the ancestors of the guitar, the gittern, was being played. It also has been confused with the Guitarra latina from the early period of instrument development in Spain, and no clear relationship nor distinction has been formed about these guitar ancestors or cousins.

Gitterns, a small plucked guitar were the first small guitar-like instruments created during the spanish Middle Ages with a round back like that of a lute. Modern guitar shaped instruments were not seen until the Renaissance era where the body and size began to take a guitar-like shape.

The earliest string instruments that related to the guitar and its structure were broadly known as the vihuelas within Spanish musical culture. Vihuelas were string instruments that were commonly seen in the 16th century during the Renaissance. Later, Spanish writers distinguished these instruments into two categories of vihuelas. The vihuela de arco was an instrument that mimicked the violin, and the vihuela de penola was played with a plectrum or by hand. When it was played by hand it was known as the vihuela de mano. Vihuela de mano shared extreme similarities with the Renaissance guitar as it used hand movement at the sound hole or sound chamber of the instrument to create music.

By 1790 only six-course vihuela guitars (six unison-tuned pairs of strings) were being created and had become the main type and model of guitar used in Spain. Most of the older 5-course guitars were still in use but were also being modified to a six-coursed acoustical guitar. Fernando Ferandiere's book Arte de tocar la guitarra espanola por musica (Madrid, 1799) describes the standard Spanish guitar from his time as an instrument with seventeen frets and six courses with the first two 'gut' strings tuned in unison called the terceras and the tuning named to 'G' of the two strings. The acoustic guitar at this time began to take the shape familiar in the modern acoustic guitar. The coursed pairs of strings eventually became less common in favor of single strings.

Finally, c. 1850, the form and structure of the modern guitar is credited to Spanish guitar maker Antonio Torres Jurado, who increased the size of the guitar body, altered its proportions, and invented the breakthrough fan-braced pattern. Bracing, which refers to the internal pattern of wood reinforcements used to secure the guitar's top and back and prevent the instrument from collapsing under tension, is an important factor in how the guitar sounds. Torres' design greatly improved the volume, tone, and projection of the instrument, and it has remained essentially unchanged since.

==== Citole and cittern ====
Citole and cittern

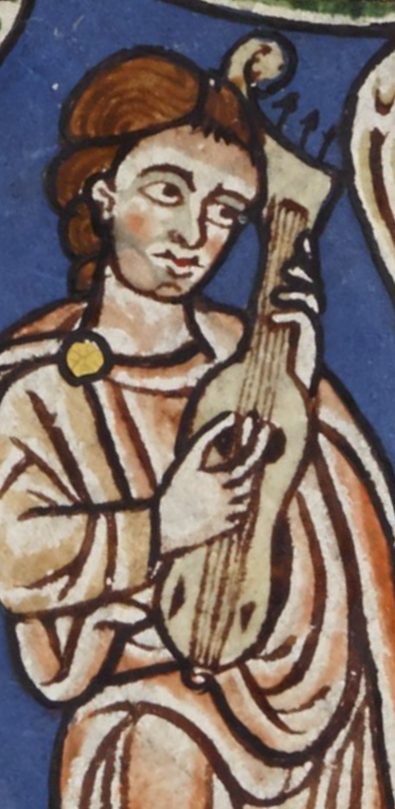
Rylands Beatus, c. 1175, cythara.

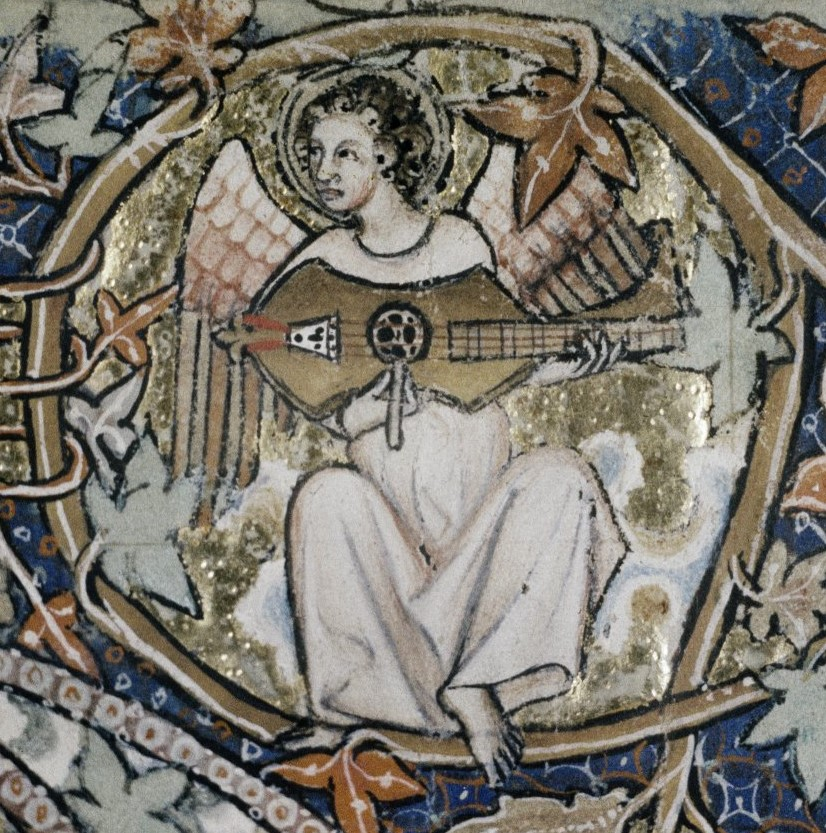
England, East Anglia. Angel playing citole in an illustration from the "Ormesby Psalter" (c. 1310)

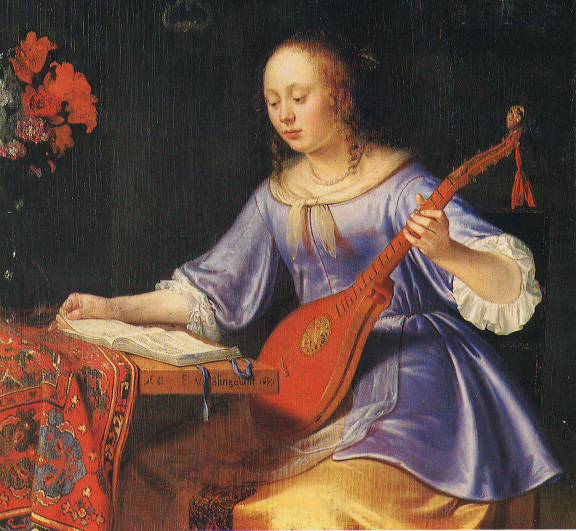
"Woman with cittern", canvas painted 1677 by Pieter van Slingelandt (c. 1630–1691).

The citole was a string musical instrument, closely associated with the medieval fiddles (viol, vielle, gigue) and commonly used in Europe from 1200–1350. The earliest representations of the instrument are in sculpture in Spain and Italy, with Spain having the most. Another link to Spain is the similarity to plucked fiddles in the Spanish Beatus Apocalypse manuscripts, such as the Ryland Beatus. Examples of these plucked fiddles trace back to Central Asian art, such as the Airtam Frieze. This artwork is too distant in time to be considered a relative, though it is very similar to many citoles.

The one surviving citole has a hollowed neck, a feature of the rubabs and Coptic lute.

Although it was largely out of use by the late 14th century, the Italians "re-introduced it in modified form" in the 16th century as the cetra (cittern in English), and it was possibly ancestral to the Spanish guitar as well. Three possible descendant instrument are the English guitar, Waldzither, Portuguese guitar and the Corsican Cetera, all types of cittern.

The cittern or cithren (Fr. cistre, It. cetra, Ger. zitter, zither, Sp. cistro, cedra, cítola)[1] is a stringed instrument dating from the Renaissance. Modern scholars debate its exact history, but it is generally accepted that it is descended from the Medieval citole (or cytole). It looks much like the modern-day flat-back mandolin and the modern Irish bouzouki. Its flat-back design was simpler and cheaper to construct than the lute. It was also easier to play, smaller, less delicate and more portable. Played by all classes, the cittern was a premier instrument of casual music-making much as is the guitar today.

==== Viola, 4-course guitars, late 15th century ====
4-course guitar, viola

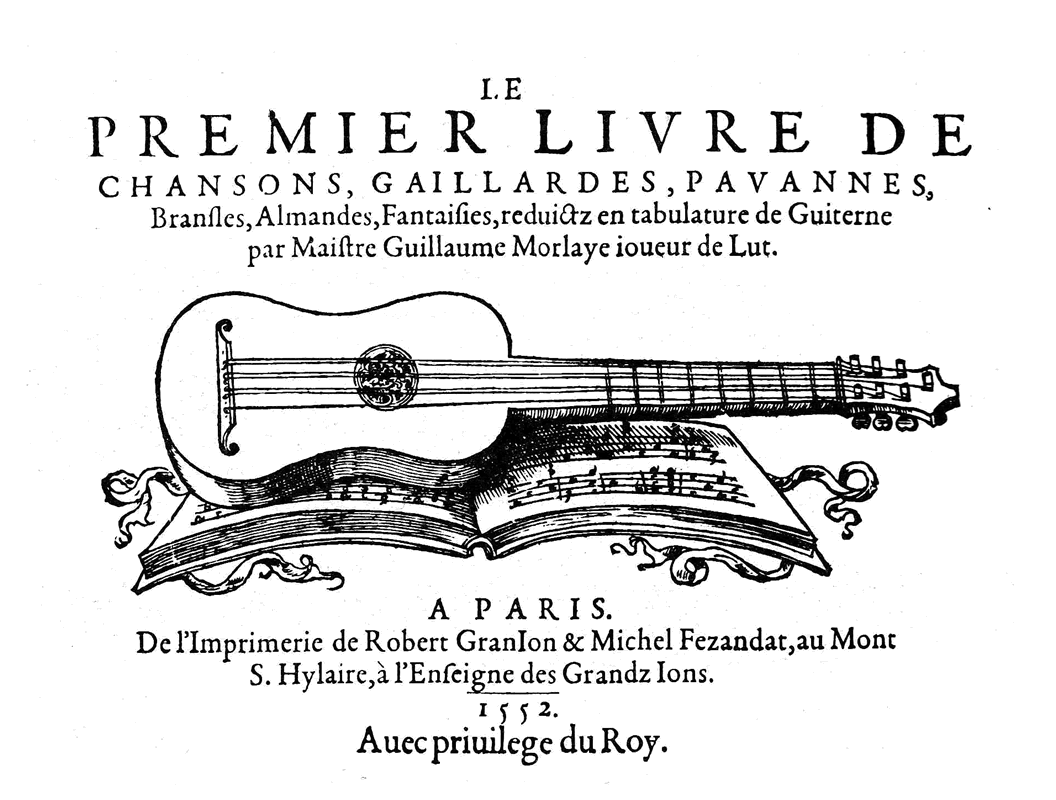
Cover of 1552 music book by Guillaume de Morlaye. Four-course guitar.

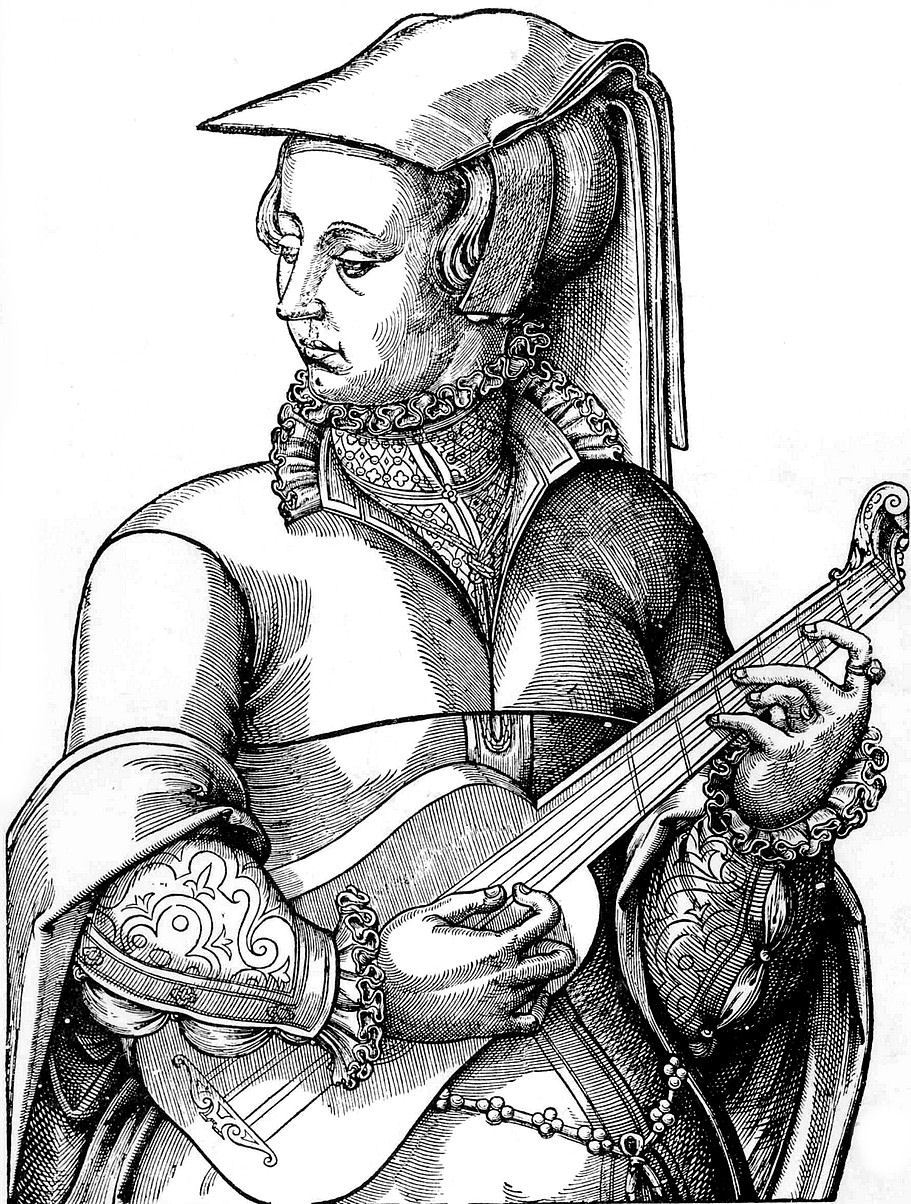
4-course guitar, c1570

By the late 15th century, small guitar shaped instruments were appearing in Spain and Italy. The instruments were smaller than lutes, which separates them from the later vihuela, which they resembled. As these took over from the gittern, they began to be called guitars in the 16th century. The use of these newer guitars overlapped with the older gittern, which may have seen occasional use into the 18th century.

Known by modern musicologists as the "Renaissance four-course guitar", the instrument was contemporary with the lute and the vihuela. The instruments were called violas by the French and Italians. As the instruments were developed in Italy, Spain and France, they grew larger, while the Portuguese kept making the smaller guitars, and still called them violas.

The instrument remained popular enough for music to be published for it in England and Italy into the 17th century, and Spain into the 18th century.

==== Plucked viol and vihuela ====
Viol, Viheula

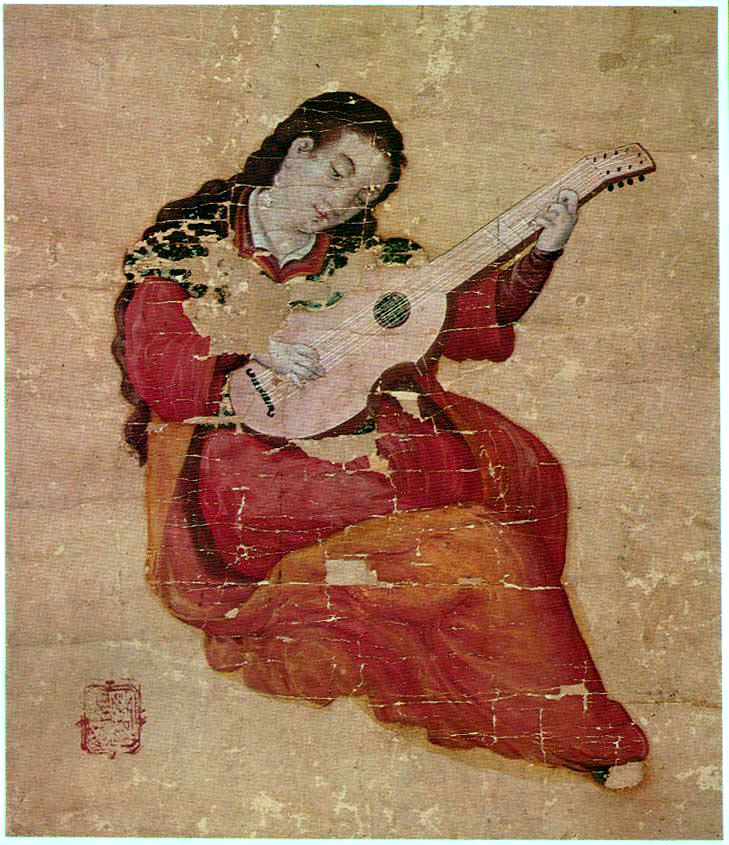
Japanese painting from 1573–1615 of a European woman with a viol. Her viol has four courses of strings. Later viols would be commonly strung with 6 single strings and played with a bow.

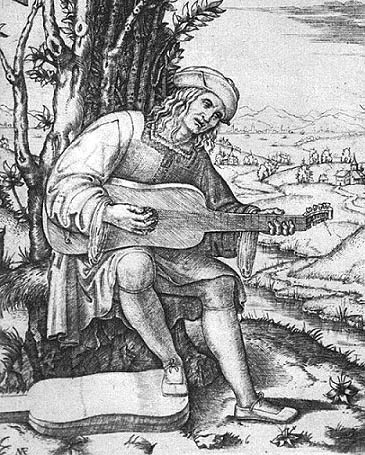
Italian engraving from before 1510. Depicts the poet Giovanni Filoteo Achillini playing the viola da mano or vihuela de mano.

The viola da mano was the Italian version of the vihuela de mano. The two instruments were equivalent, but with different bodies. The viol had "C-shape cuts with pointed corners" while the vihuela had a "figure-of-eight body shape".

The vihuela was a guitar-shaped instrument that existed at the same time as the 4-course and 5-course guitars, tuned as a lute, with moveable gut frets. Its resemblance to the guitar has caused speculation that it might be related. However the 4-course guitar predates the vihuela, and that was the instrument was which was modified to create the 5-course guitar.

The guitar was an instrument of popular music; the vihuela was an instrument for the "virtuoso player". Vihuela was used as a word in Spain starting in the 13th century. The instrument was popular in Spain in the 15th and 16th centuries. In Italy and Portugal it was called viola.

There were several different types of vihuela (or different playing methods at least):

- Vihuela de mano: 6 or 5 courses played with the fingers
- Vihuela de penola: played with a quill plectrum
- Vihuela de arco: played with a bow (ancestor of the viola da gamba)
- Viola da Gamba: leg viol
- Viola da braccio: arm viol

Plucked vihuelas, being essentially flat-backed lutes, evolved in the mid-15th century, in the Kingdom of Aragón, located in north-eastern Iberia (Spain). In Spain, Portugal, and Italy the vihuela was in common use by the late 15th through to the late 16th centuries. In the second half of the 15th century some vihuela players began using a bow, leading to the development of the viol.

The vihuela faded away, along with the complex polyphonic music that was its repertoire, in the late 16th century. The vihuela's descendants that are still played are the violas campaniças of Portugal. Much of the vihuela's place, role, and function was taken up by the subsequent Baroque guitar (also sometimes referred to as vihuela or bigüela).

Today, instruments like the tiple are descendants of vihuelas brought to America in the 16th century.

==== Baroque guitar ====
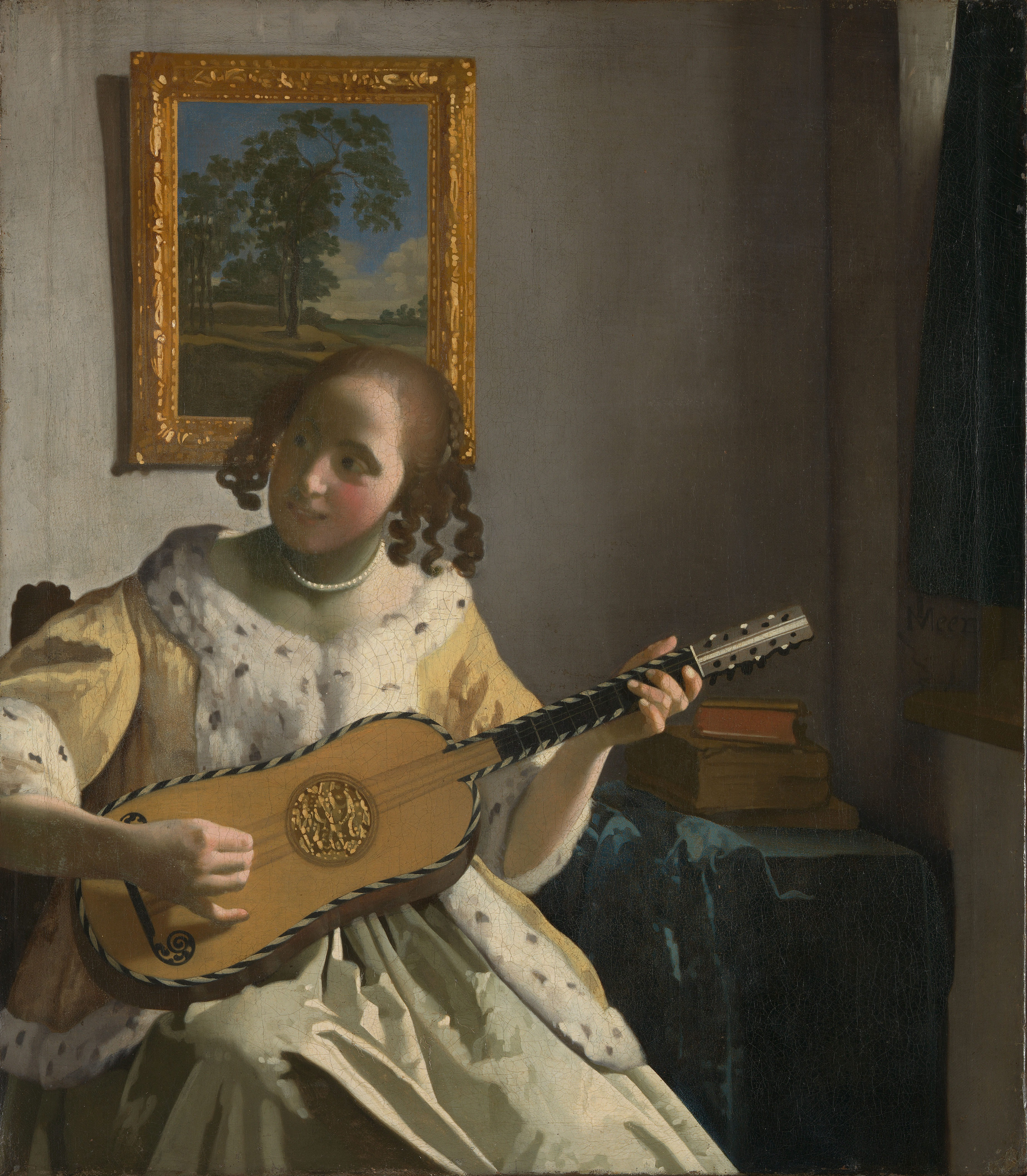
Dutch Republic, c. 1672. The guitar player by Johannes Vermeer

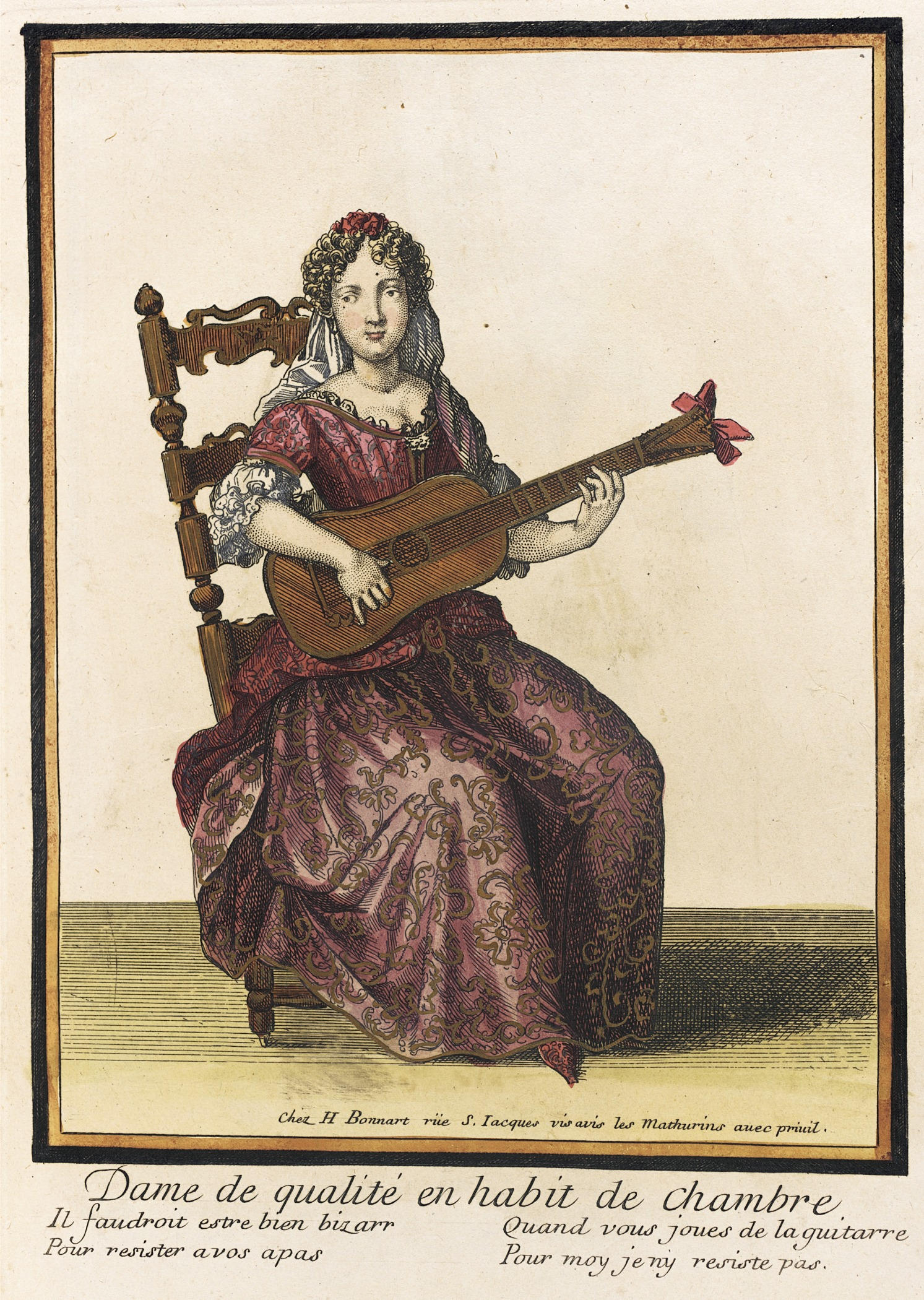
France, 1683. Quality Lady in Dressing Gown by Henri Bonnart

The Baroque guitar (c. 1600–1750) is a string instrument with five courses of gut strings and moveable gut frets. 5-course guitars were used in Italy by the late 1400s. Like the 4-course guitar and the vihuela, this instrument could also be called viola or vihuela and use the variations, such as viola da mano, vihuela del mano.

The "Hispano-Italian guitar" was made fashionable in the 17th century by Italian actors, working in Paris. It was first an instrument of aristocrats, inspired by the actors, and later it became an amateur instrument.

The Baroque guitar replaced the Renaissance lute as the most common instrument found in the home. The earliest attestation of a five-stringed guitar comes from the mid-sixteenth-century Spanish book Declaracion de Instrumentos Musicales by Juan Bermudo, published in 1555. The first treatise published for the Baroque guitar was Guitarra Española de cinco ordenes (The Five-course Spanish Guitar), c. 1590, by Juan Carlos Amat. The baroque guitar in contemporary ensembles took on the role of a basso continuo instrument and players would be expected to improvise a chordal accompaniment. Several scholars have assumed that the guitar was used together with another basso continuo instrument playing the bass line. However, there are good reasons to suppose that the guitar was used as an independent instrument for accompaniment in many situations. Intimately tied to the development of the Baroque guitar is the alfabeto system of notation.

==== 6-string guitar ====
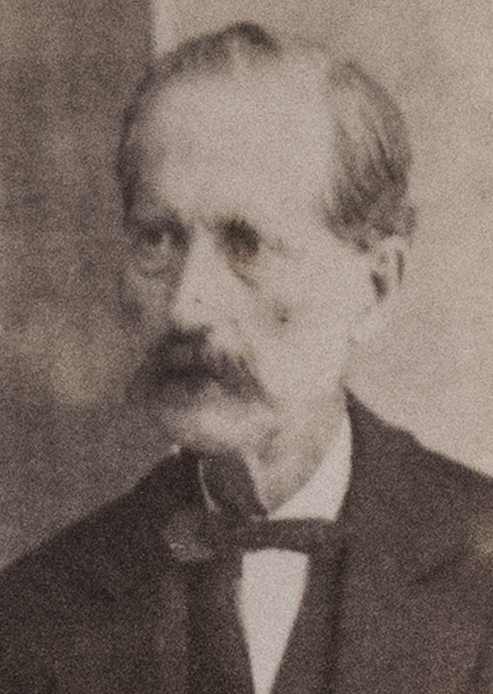
Antonio de Torres Jurado

In the second half of the 18th century, the doubled strings of the 5-course guitar began to become single strings, and by the end of the century, the 5-string guitar was out of fashion, in favor of the 6-string guitar. Examples of the new instrument with its additional low E string were seen in Spain (by 1780), Italy, France and England.

By the second half of the 19th century, luthier Antonio de Torres Jurado (1817–1892) had created the modern classical guitar. Ignacio Fleta (1897–1977) and Hermann Hauser Sr. (1882–1952) have also been linked to creating fine early versions of the instrument in the 20th century.

== Spanish and Portuguese descendant lutes in former colonies ==
Both Spain and Portugal took their instruments with them overseas. Spanish instruments were related to the vihuela. The Portuguese cavaquinho also was the forerunner of a family of instruments.

Even after the Muslims were conquered in Spain or driven out, the process of experimentation continued, leading to a number of European instruments, including the guitar. A similar process occurred in Italy. Both Spain and Italy experimented with the viol or vihuela which led to bowed viols, violas, vielles, and guitars. Other experiments led to the citole and cittern or Portuguese guitar, the gittern and vandola (mandore, mandola) which also led to the guitar, but also to the mandolin family. Spanish instruments that survived in Spanish colonies include the tiple.

=== Portuguese ===
==== Portuguese violas ====
See: Violas portuguesas (Portuguese Wikipedia)

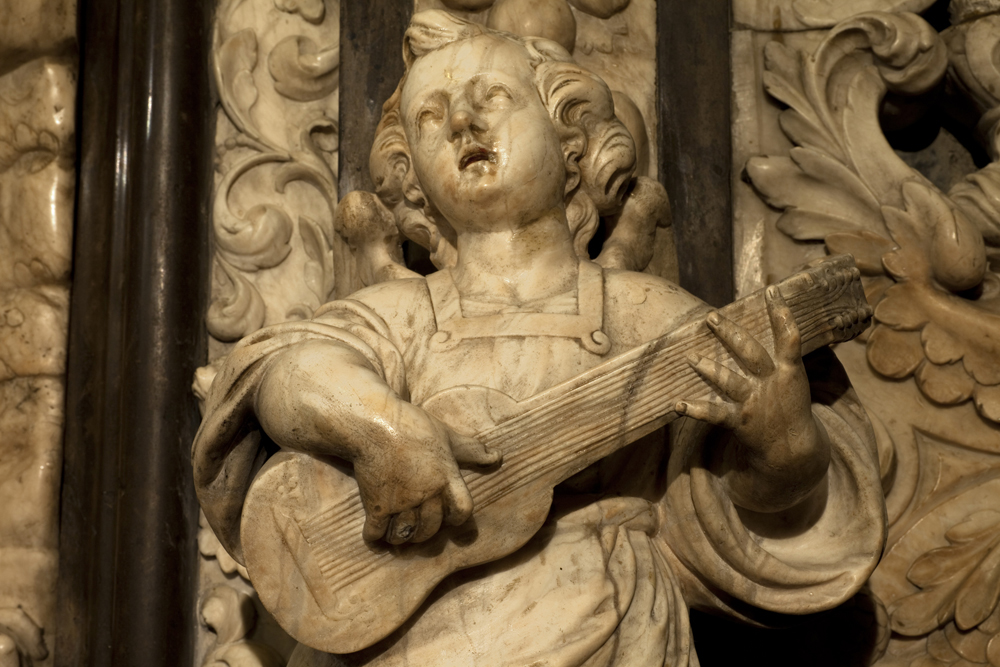
1666, Cave of Saint Ignatius. Angel with 10 string viola.

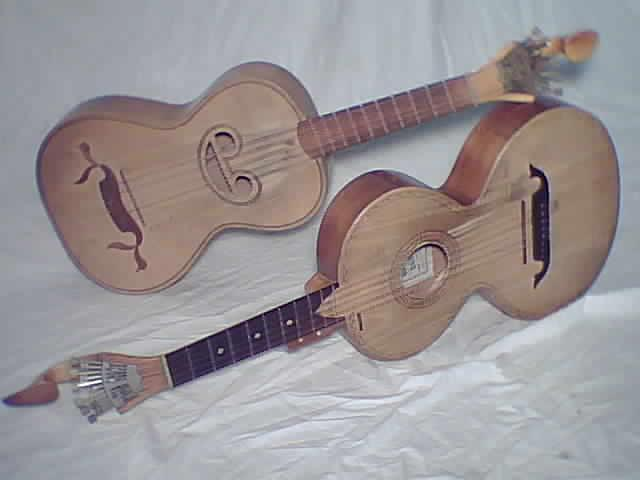
Two Portuguese instruments: the viola beiroa from Beira Baixa Province (right) and the cavaquino or machete or viola braguesa from Braga.

The Portuguese violas are a collection of instruments shaped like a classical guitar but smaller. Although the body is shaped like an "8", these instruments are not descended from the guitar. While the modern guitar was introduced in Portugal in the 18th century from France and has 6 simple strings, the Portuguese violas are older, were developed from the Iberian vihuela, are smaller and have 5 courses of double strings. Due to the widespread use in Portugal of the word "viola" to designate the guitar, it is common to call these violas "violas of 10 strings". However, there are no records of being called "10-string guitars".

Some of them are on the verge of extinction, but others continue to enjoy great popularity, despite being restricted to the interpretation of popular music. From Portugal, these instruments were taken to Brazil.

Violas native to Portugal include the Viola Braguesa, Viola Amarantina, Viola Toeira, Wire Viola, Viola Campaniça, and Viola Beiroa.

==== Brazilian violas ====
In Brazil, the viola became the viola caipira, while the classical guitar was called the violão. The viola caipira is an instrument of the Brazilian rural music while the violão an instrument of urban life.

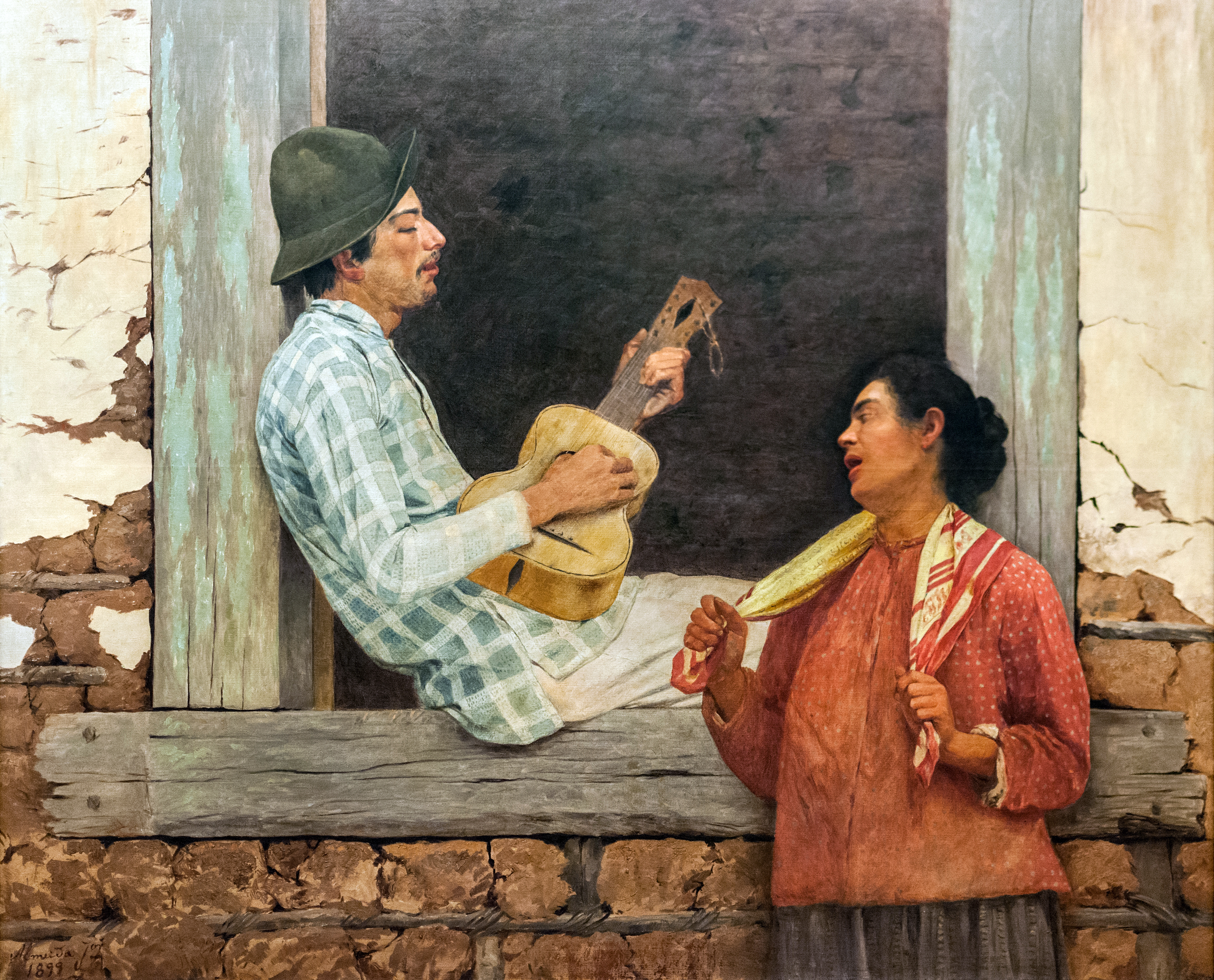
Brazil. Viola caipira

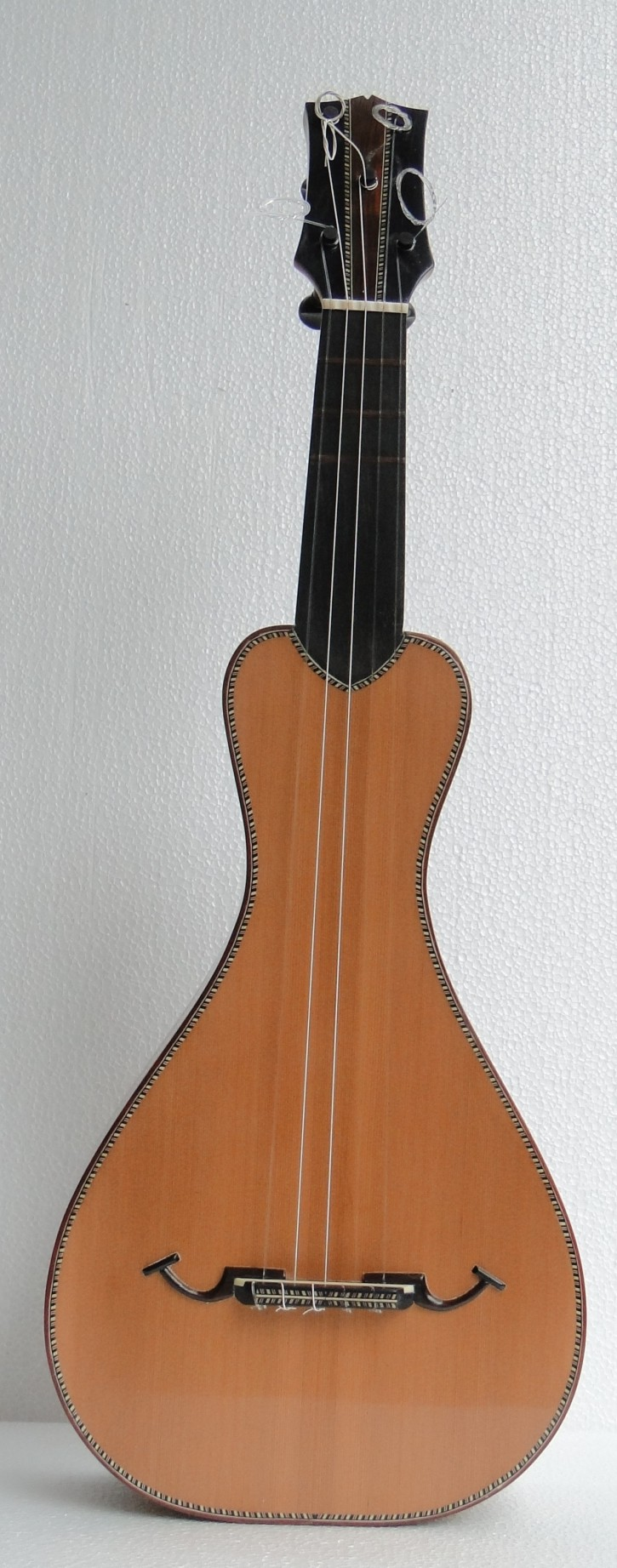
Brazil. Viola de cocho

Brazilian violas include the

- viola caipira, common in the states of Goiás, Paraná, São Paulo, Minas Gerais and Rio de Janeiro
- Angrense or coastal viola, Common on the coast of the states of Paraná, São Paulo and Rio de Janeiro, and associated with caiçara culture.
- Viola branca (white viola), specific to the region of Iguape and Cananéia, on the coast of the state of São Paulo.
- Viola de Queluz, Specific the ancient city of Queluz.
- Viola machete, also called machete, machim, machinho, machetinho or mochinho, and possibly originally from Madeira Island.
- Viola de cocho, common in the states of Mato Grosso and Mato Grosso do Sul.
- Viola de buriti, common in the state of Tocantins, from the use of buriti wood. Created in the 1940s in the community of Mumbuca do Jalapão.
- Viola dinâmica (or viola nordestina), Common in the Northeastern Brazilian states and very associated with record players, who often use the Paraguaçu tuning. It has acoustic amplifiers in the form of aluminum cones

==== Cavaquinho ====
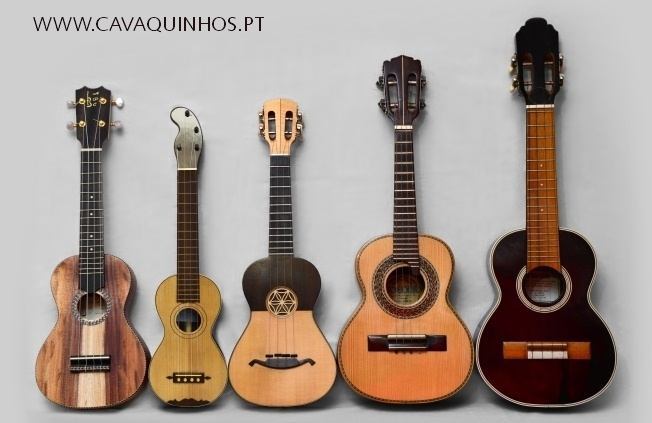
From left: Hawaiian ukulele, Madeira braguinha, Portuguese cavaquinho, Brazilian cavaquinho, Cape Verde cavaquinho.

Portuguese experiments led to the Portuguese guitar, and other instruments seen today in places that Portuguese ships landed. There are several forms of cavaquinho used in different regions and for different styles of music. Separate varieties are named for Portugal, Braga (braguinha), Minho (minhoto), Lisbon, Madeira, Brazil, and Cape Verde; other forms are the braguinha, cavacolele, cavaco, machete, and ukulele.

==== Ukulele ====
The ukulele originated in the 1880s, based on several small guitar-like instruments of Portuguese origin, the machete, the cavaquinho, the timple, and the rajão, which were introduced to the Hawaiian Islands by Portuguese immigrants from Madeira and Cape Verde. Three immigrants in particular, Madeiran cabinet makers Manuel Nunes, José do Espírito Santo, and Augusto Dias, are generally credited as the first ukulele makers. Two weeks after they disembarked from the SS Ravenscrag in late August 1879, the Hawaiian Gazette reported that "Madeira Islanders recently arrived here, have been delighting the people with nightly street concerts." The instrument gained great popularity elsewhere in the United States during the early 20th century and from there spread internationally.

=== Spanish ===
==== Tiple ====
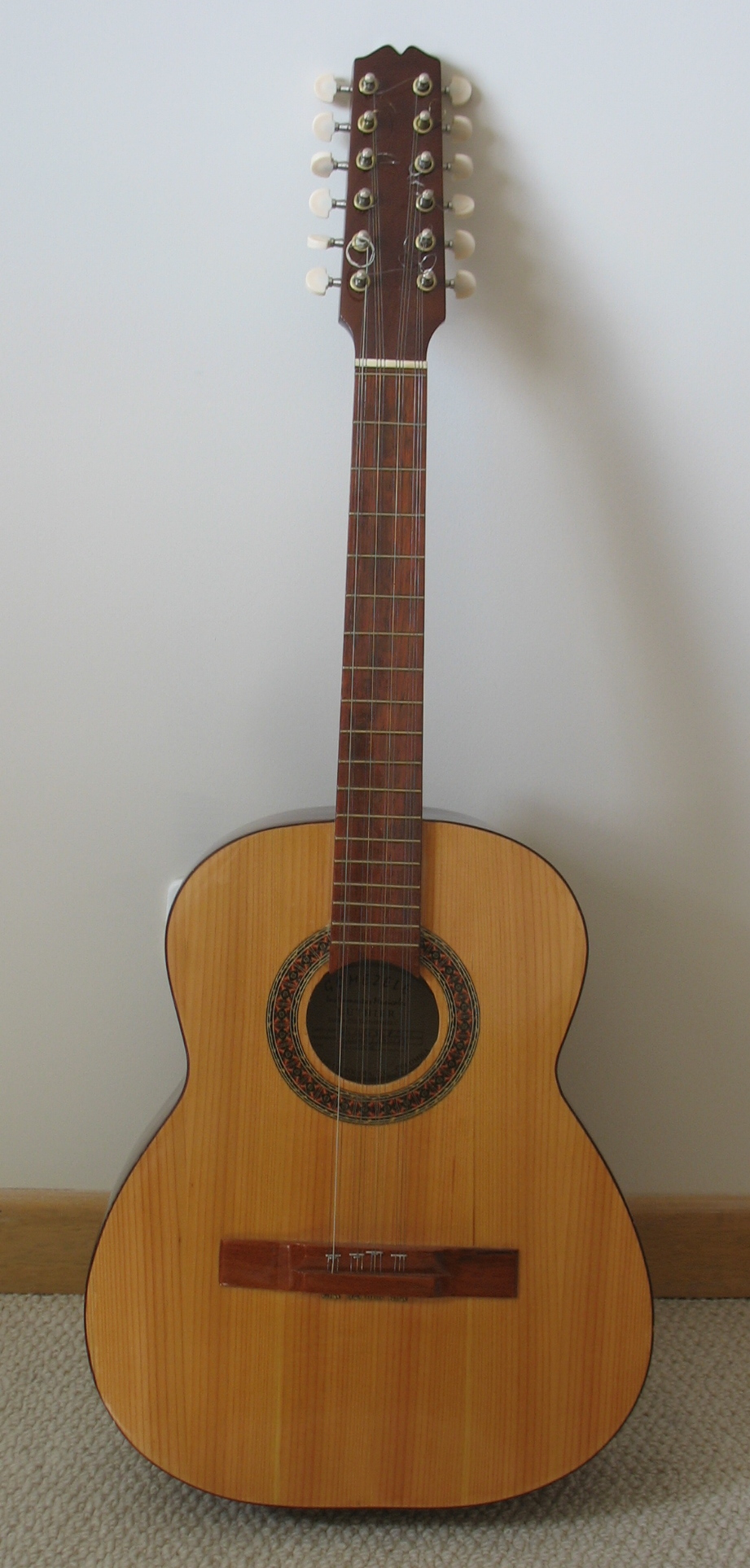
The Colombian tiple is larger than the Puerto Rican tiple.

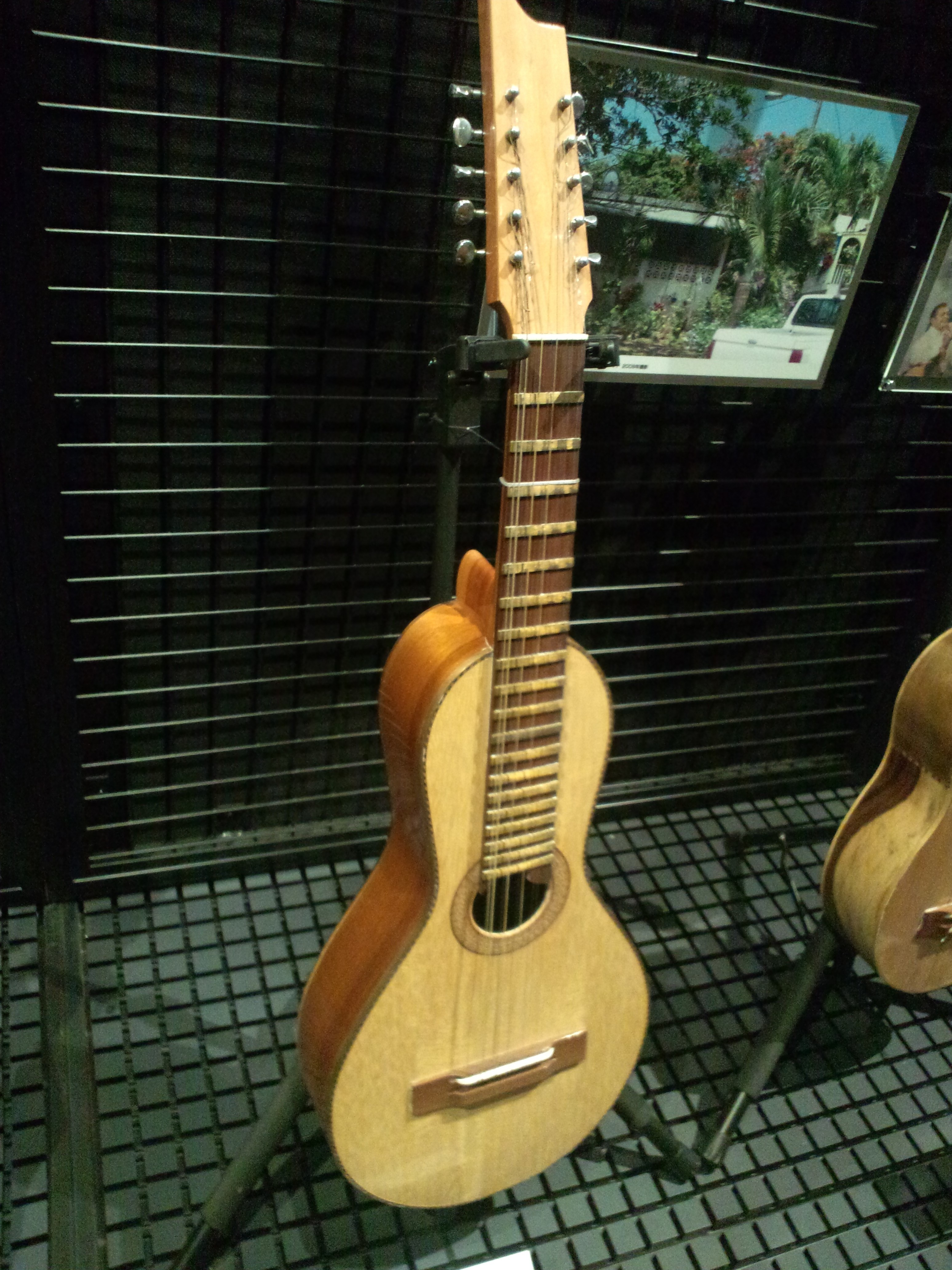
Puerto Rico. Bordonua, has a large, deep body (sound-boxes are usually 6 inches (15 cm) deep) bass guitar

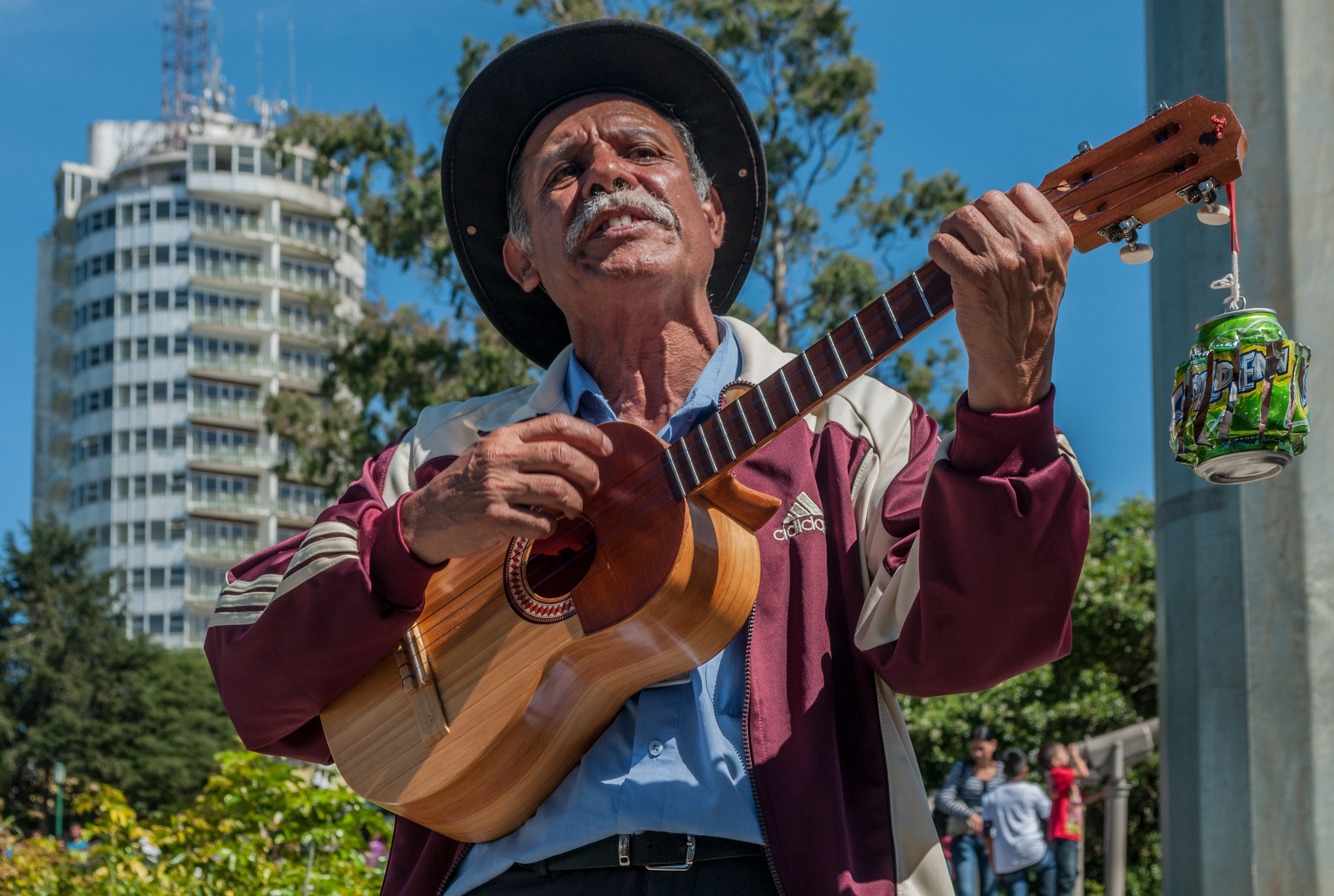
Venezuelan cuatro

A tiple (literally treble or soprano) is a plucked-string chordophone of the guitar family. The first mention of the tiple comes from musicologist Pablo Minguet e Irol in 1752. David Pelham says of the Colombian tiple: "The tiple is a Colombian adaptation of the Renaissance Spanish vihuela brought to the New World in the 16th century by the Spanish conquistadors. At the end of the 19th century, it evolved to its present shape.

The tipple of Puerto Rico is the smallest of the three string instruments of Puerto Rico that make up the orquesta jibara (i.e., the Cuatro, the Tiple and the Bordonua). According to investigations made by Jose Reyes Zamora, the tiple in Puerto Rico dates back to the 18th century. It is believed to have evolved from the Spanish guitarrillo. There was never a standard for the tiple and as a result there are many variations throughout the island of Puerto Rico including the most common tiple doliente, two smaller tiples (the tiple requinto and tiple vihuela), the larger tiplón or tiple con macho, and the largest tiple grande de Ponce.

==== Bordonua ====
The Puerto Rico bordonua resembles the old 17th century Spanish guitars, possibly including the Bajo de la Una. There were also special melodic Bordonuas that were used during the 1920s and 1930s as accompaniment to melody instead of the bass role. These were oddly tuned like a Tiple. This configuration is no longer used on the island. They are also related to the Spanish renaissance Vihuela, brought to the Island by conquering Spanish.

==== Cuatro ====
The cuatro is a family of Latin American string instruments played in Cuba, Puerto Rico, Venezuela and other Latin American countries. The instrument's 15th-century predecessors were the Spanish vihuela and the Portuguese cavaquinho. Although some have viola-like shapes, most cuatros resemble a small to mid-sized classical guitar. In Puerto Rico and Venezuela, the cuatro is an ensemble instrument for secular and religious music, and is played at parties and traditional gatherings.

==== Bandurria, bandolón and bandola ====
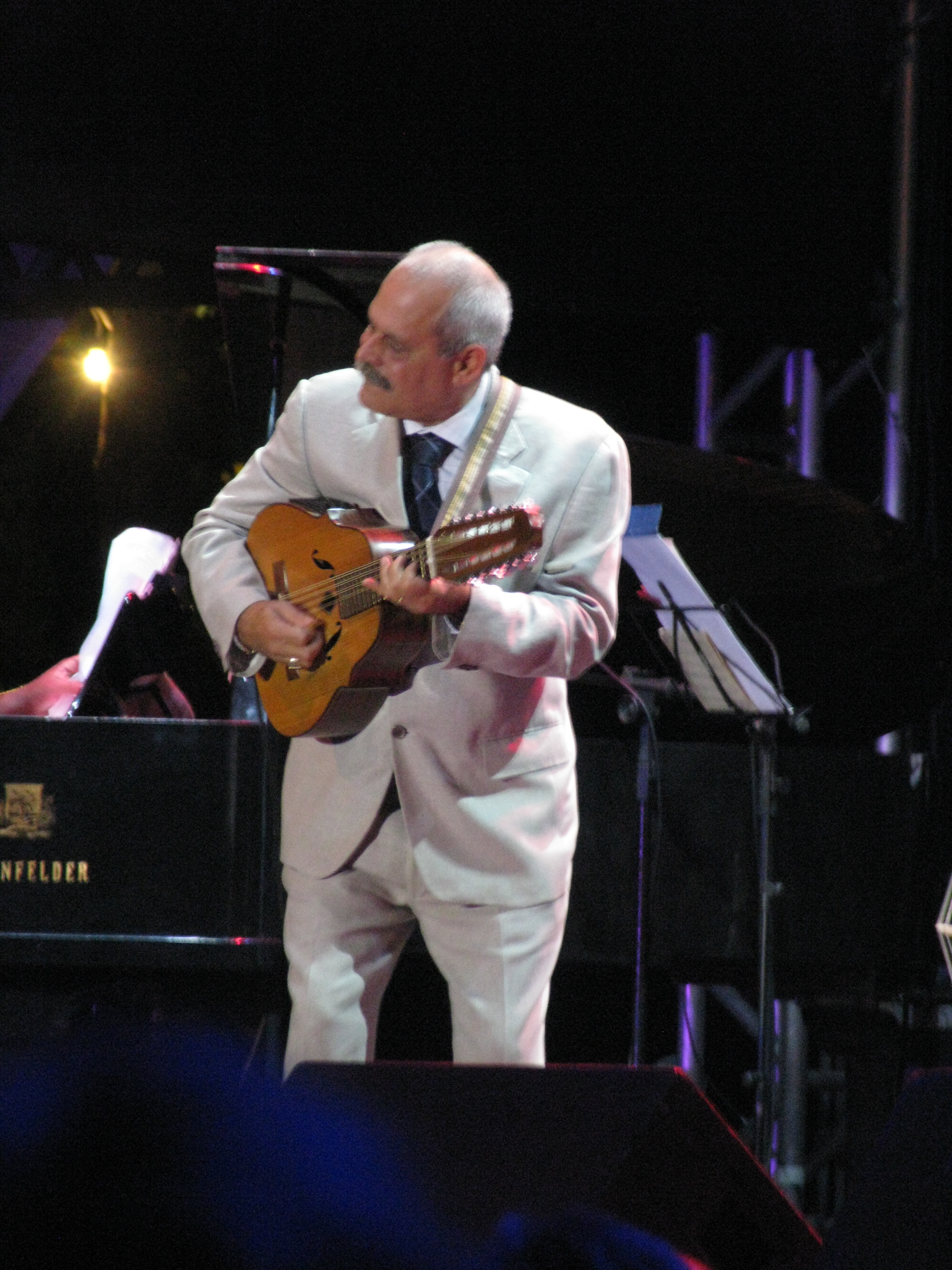
Cuban musician Barbarito Torres playing a Spanish lute or Laúd.

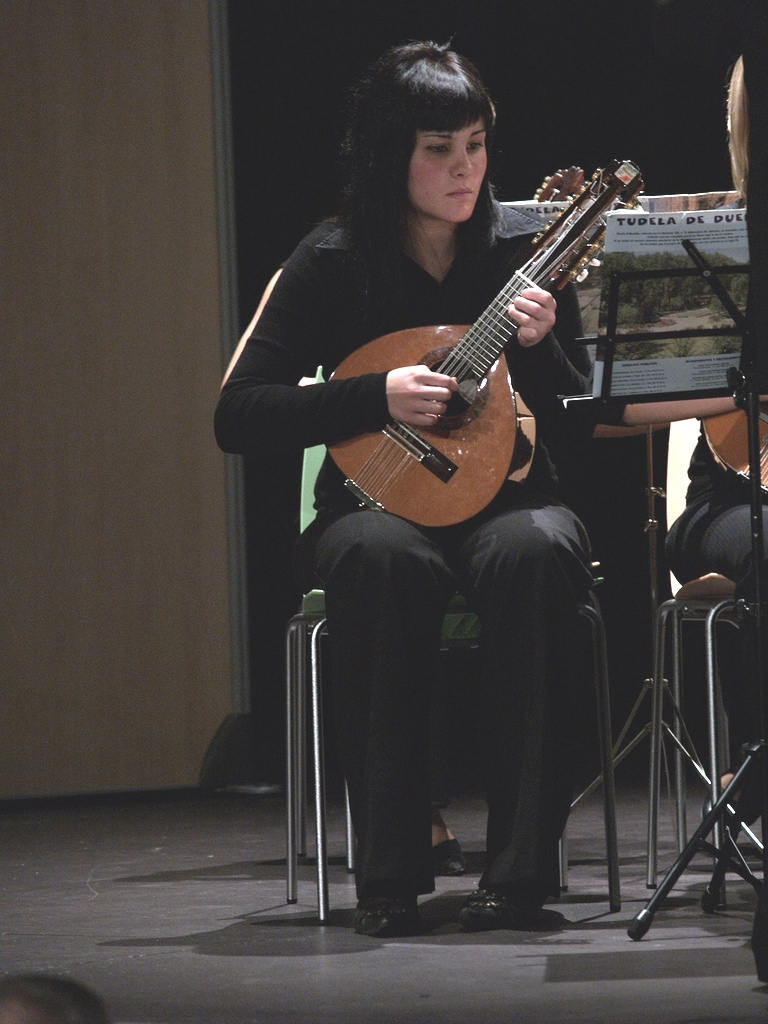
International, including Spain, China, Philippines. Bandurria

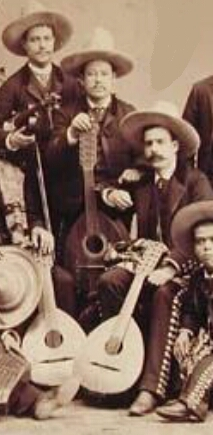
Three 18-string bandolons

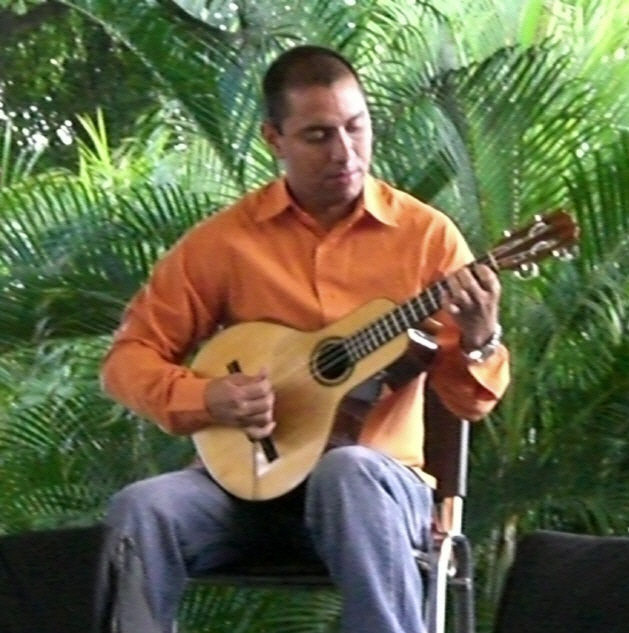
Moisés Torrealba playing a Bandola llanera.

The bandurria and laúd are members of a family, resembling a type of cittern. They have become international instruments, played in Spain and in former colonies of the Spanish Empire, including Cuba and the Philippines. The bandurria is an older instrument, its roots going back to the Mandore, which birthed both mandolin and bandurria. The laúd was developed about 1880.

The bandurria was the Spanish version of the mandore, and the modern instrument is thus related to the mandolin family. The similarity of the instruments affects the history of other instruments from South and Central America; a variety of instruments exist called bandolas. At least one, the bandola andina colombiana, is related to the bandurria. The others are not clear at this time, and possibilities include mandolin family instruments such as the mandola or the cittern family. These were all present in Spain and Portugal during the colonization era. The bandolas have multiple courses of strings, like the bandurrias, mandolins and citterns.

Juan Ruiz first mentioned the term "mandurria" in the 14th century in his Libro De Buen Amor. After that, Juan Bermudo gave the description of the bandurria in his "Comiença el libro llamado declaraciõ de instrumentos" as a three-string instrument in 1555, but he also mentioned other types with four or even five strings.

It had become a flat-backed instrument by the 18th century, with five double courses of strings, tuned in fourths. The original bandurrias of the Medieval period had three strings. During the Renaissance they gained a fourth string. During the Baroque period the bandurria had 10 strings (5 pairs).

There are also many different varieties of bandurria in South America, especially Peru and Bolivia. They have four courses, unlike the traditional Spanish six courses. The four courses are double, triple or quadruple, and the tuning is guitar-like, rather than the fourths tuning used on the Spanish type. In Lima, Peru, harp and bandurria duos were common in the early 20th century. Nowadays people there still play bandurria accompanying with the popular vals peruano, or vals criollo.

The Philippine harp bandurria is a 14-string bandurria used in many Philippine folkloric songs, with 16 frets and a shorter neck than the 12-string bandurria. This instrument probably evolved in the Philippines during the Spanish period, from 1521 to 1898.

Larger instruments gave developed in the bandurria family including the Mexican bandolón and several instruments called bandola from Venezuela, Colombia and Peru. These include the Bandola llanera, bandola andina colombiana, bandola oriental, bandola guayanesa, and bandola Andina (or bandola Aymara or Peruvian bandola).

=== Mexican instruments ===
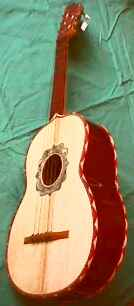
Mexican vihuela

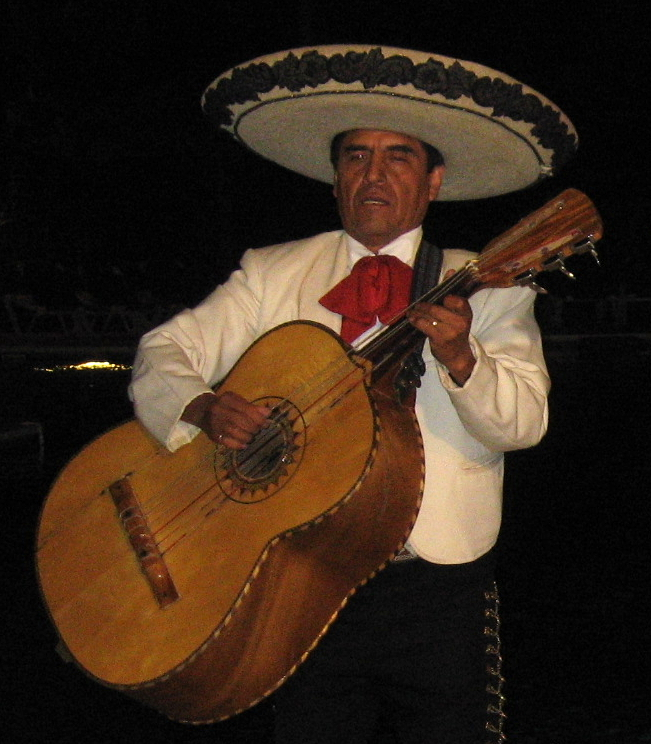
Guitarrón mexicano

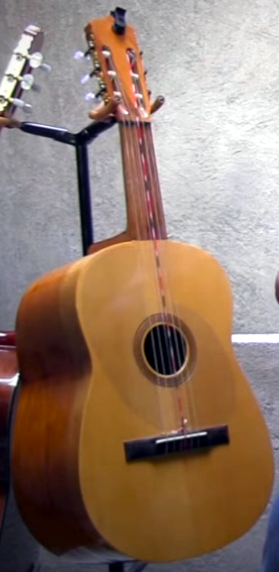
Guitarra panzona

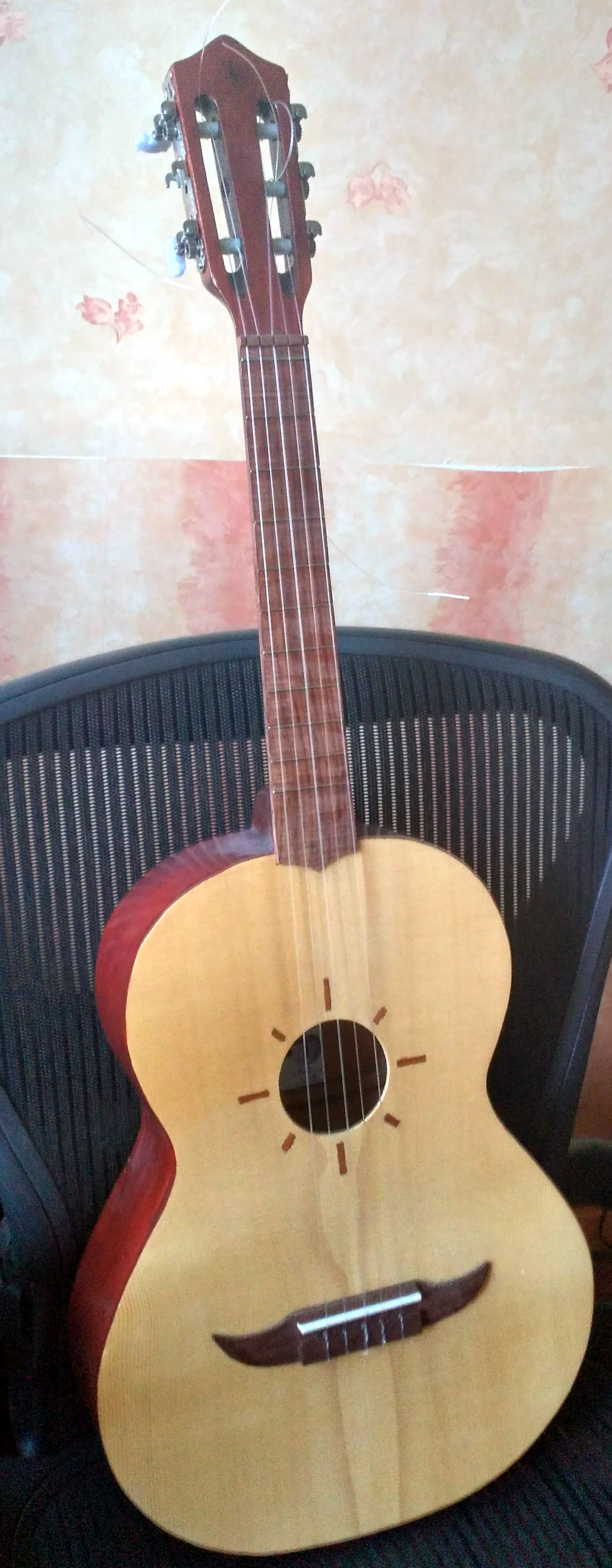
Guitarra de golpe

In the 17th and 18th centuries, Mexican artisans built several types of instruments with double strings in three, four, five, six, seven and eight courses, influenced by their Spanish ancestors. Descendants of these instruments are bandolon, guitarra séptima, quinta huapanguera, jarana jarocha, concheras, and guitarra chamula, among others.

==== Mexican vihuela ====
Although the Mexican vihuela has the same name as the historic Spanish plucked string instrument, the two are distinct. The Mexican vihuela has more in common with the Timple Canario (see: timple) due to both having five strings and both having vaulted (convex) backs. The Mexican vihuela is a small, deep-bodied rhythm guitar built along the same lines as the guitarrón. The Mexican Vihuela is used by Mariachi groups.

==== Guitarron mexicano ====
Although similar to a guitar, the Guitarrón mexicano was developed from the 16th-century Spanish bajo de uña ("fingernail[-plucked] bass").

==== Guitarra panzona ====
The guitarra panzona, guitarra túa or guitarra blanca is a Mexican guitar —with six strings and deep body. This guitar is sometimes substituted by a guitarron. It provides a tubby sounding rhythm for calentano music, accompanying violin, guitar and tamborita.

==== Guitarra de golpe ====
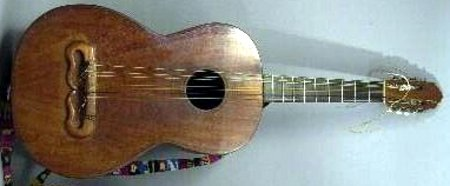
Huapanguera

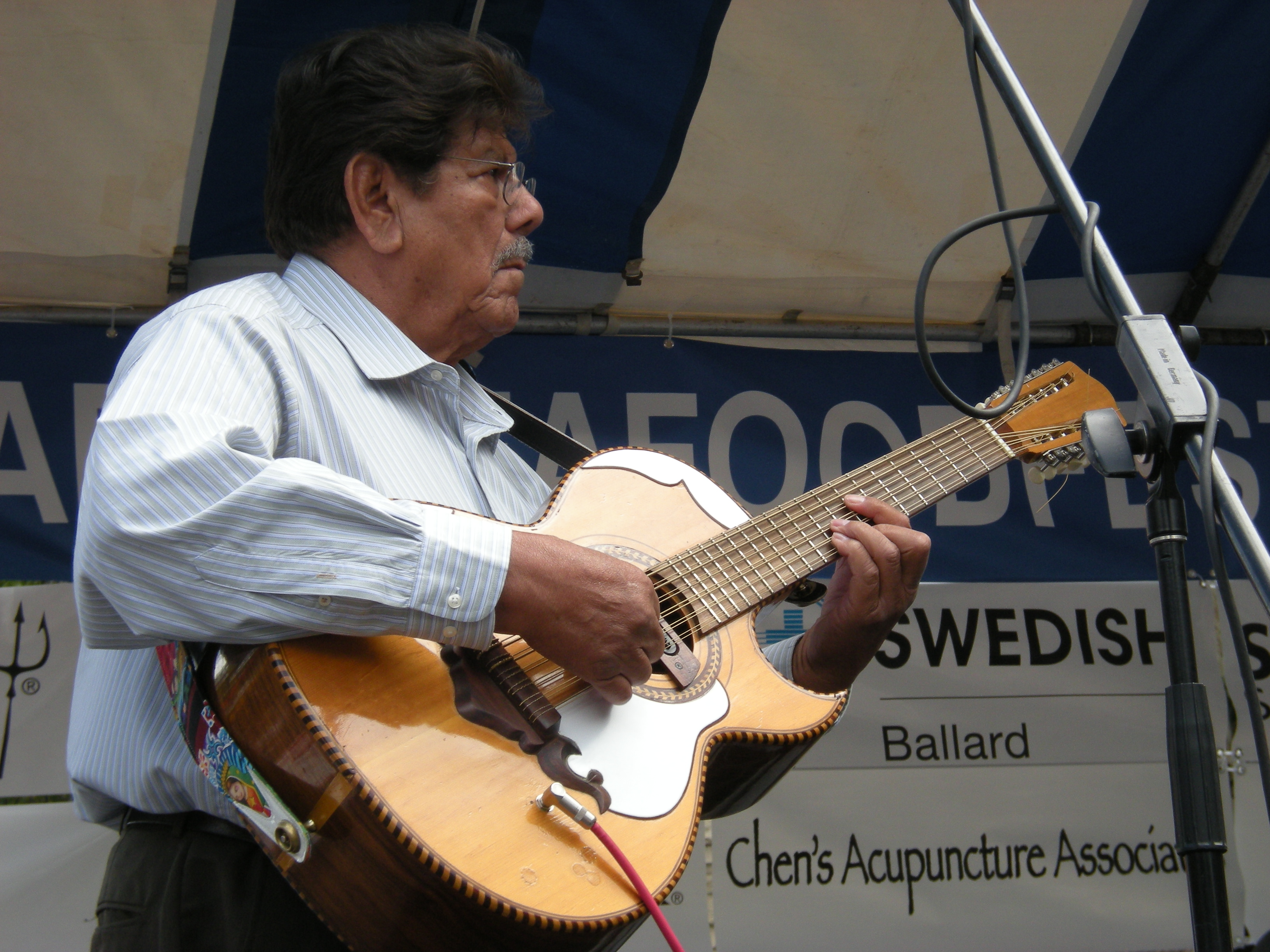
Bajo sexto

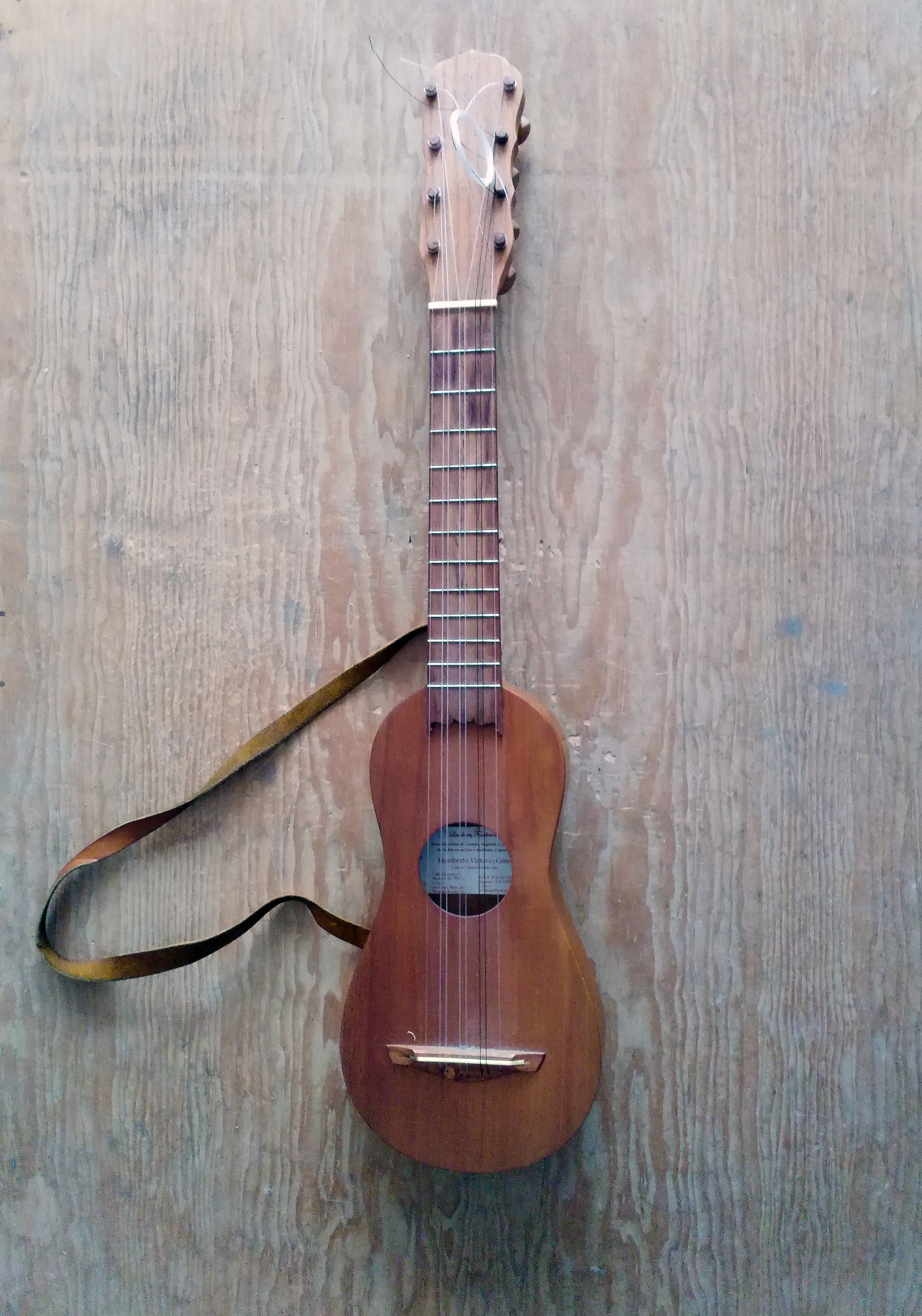
jarana huasteca

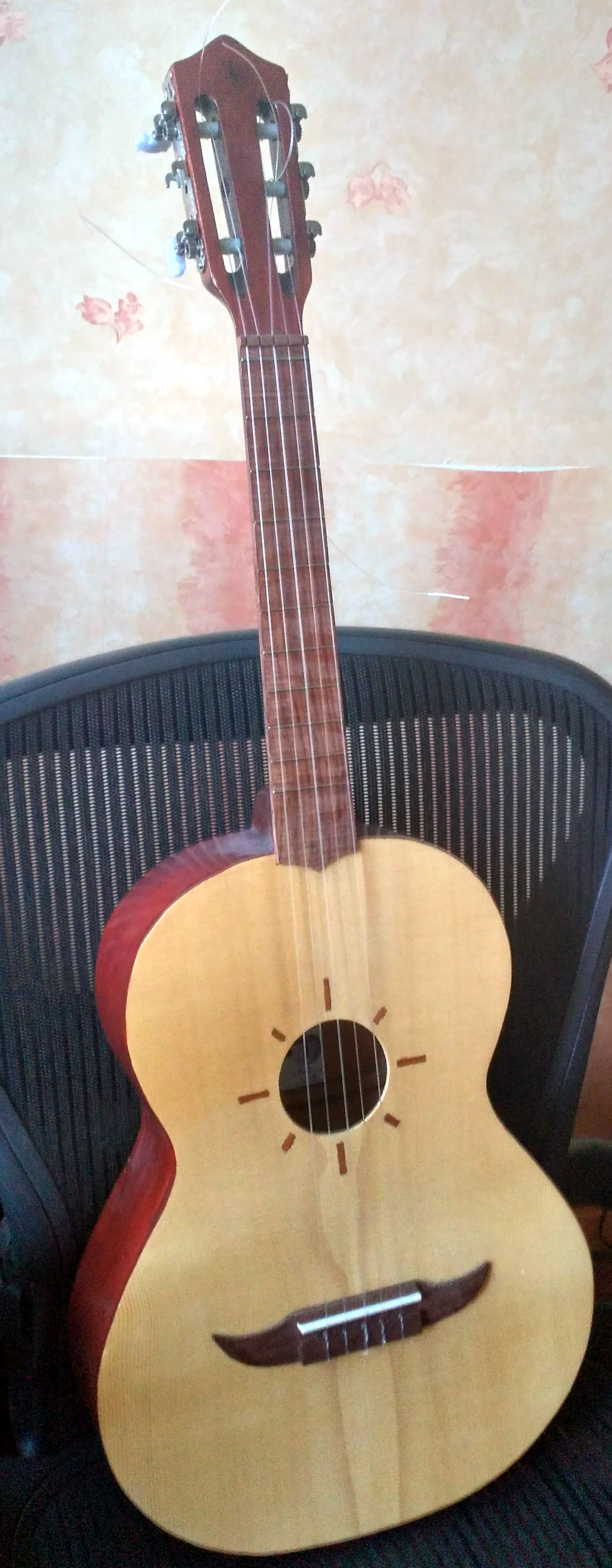
Guitarra de golpe

A Guitarra de golpe is a type of 5-string guitar designed in Mexico. The perked once had a distinct traditional shape that is designed to look like a stylised owl with wooden pegs, but nowadays this is sometimes replaced with a guitar or vihuela style headstock with machine heads. For a while during the 20th century, the Guitarra De Golpe fell into disuse in traditional Mariachi groups, and was replaced by the Classical guitar. It has now however been revived.

==== Huapanguera ====
The huapanguera, guitarra quinta huapanguera or guitarra huapanguera is a Mexican guitar-like instrument that usually forms part of a conjunto huasteco ensemble, along with the jarana huasteca guitar and violin. Because of its large body and deeper structure, the huapanguera is able provide a much deeper sound compared to a regular acoustic guitar. Here it takes on the role of the bass instrument using a rhythmical strumming technique. Its physical construction features a large resonating body with a short neck.

==== Jarana huasteca ====
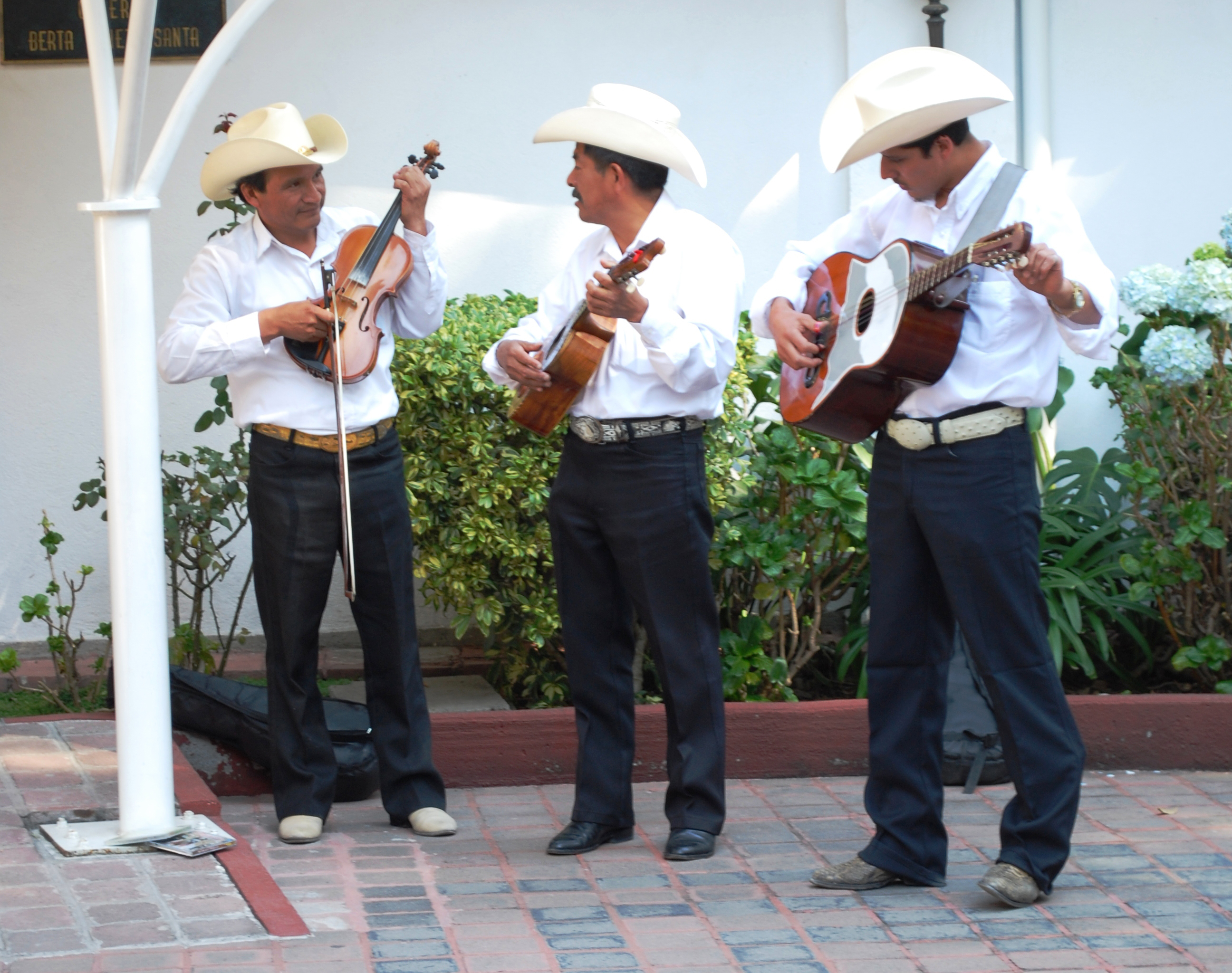
Mexico. A son huasteco trio, featuring a violin, jarana huasteca and huapanguera.

The jarana huasteca, jarana de son huasteco or jaranita is a string instrument. It is most often called simply jarana. It is a guitar-like chordophone with 5 strings. It is smaller than the guitarra huapanguera and usually forms part of the trío huasteco ensemble, along with the quinta huapanguera and violin, taking on the role of the rhythmical accompaniment to the ensemble.

==== Bajo sexto ====
The bajo quinto is probably a descendant of the Italian baroque chitarra battente.

The manufacture of bajo quinto and sexto reached a peak in quality and popularity in the 19th century in central and southern Mexico, in the states of Guerrero, Michoacán, Morelos, Puebla, Oaxaca, and Tlaxcala.

=== Native American creations ===
==== Concheras ====
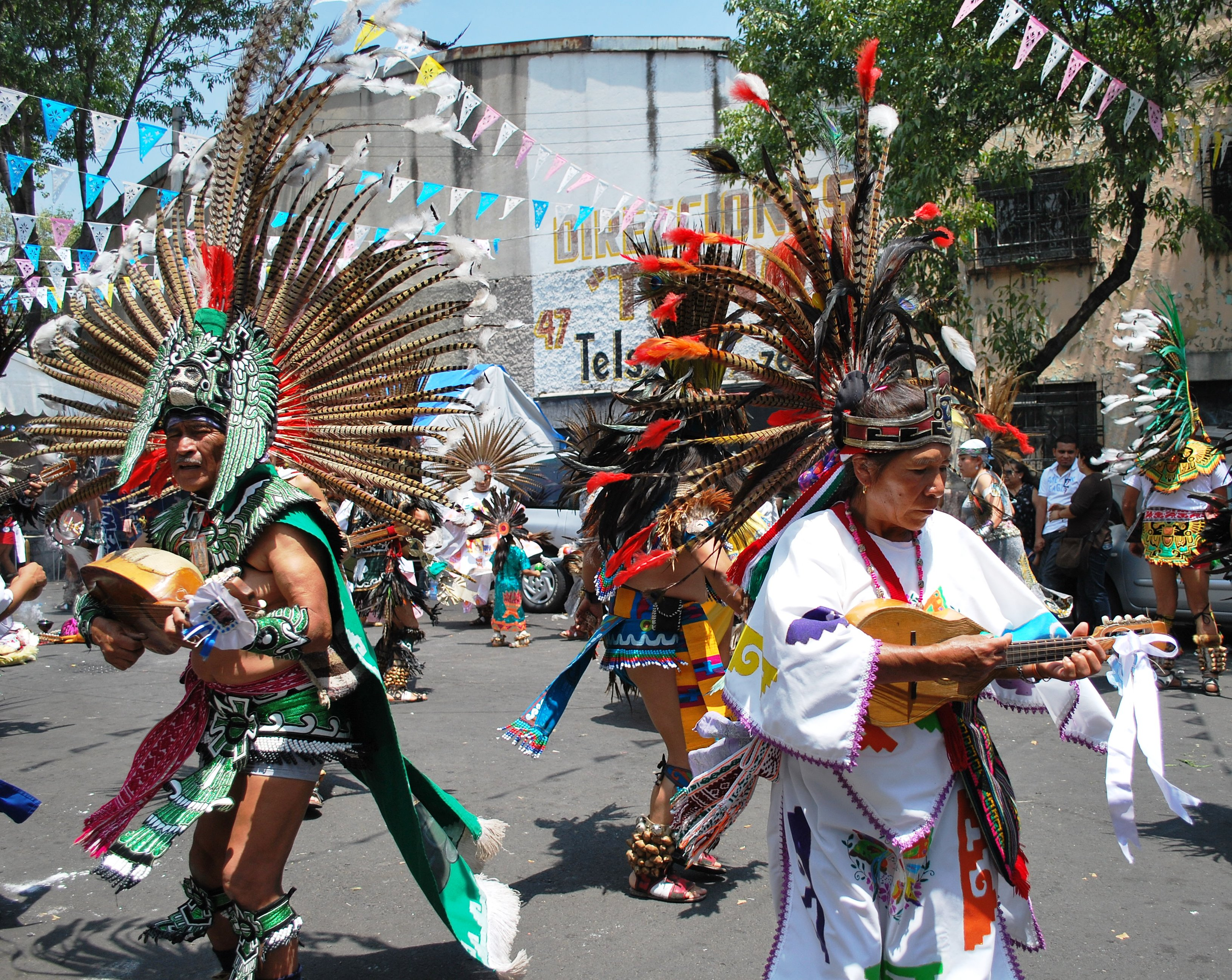
Mexico. Native Americans playing mandolin and vihuela de conchera in Mexico City.

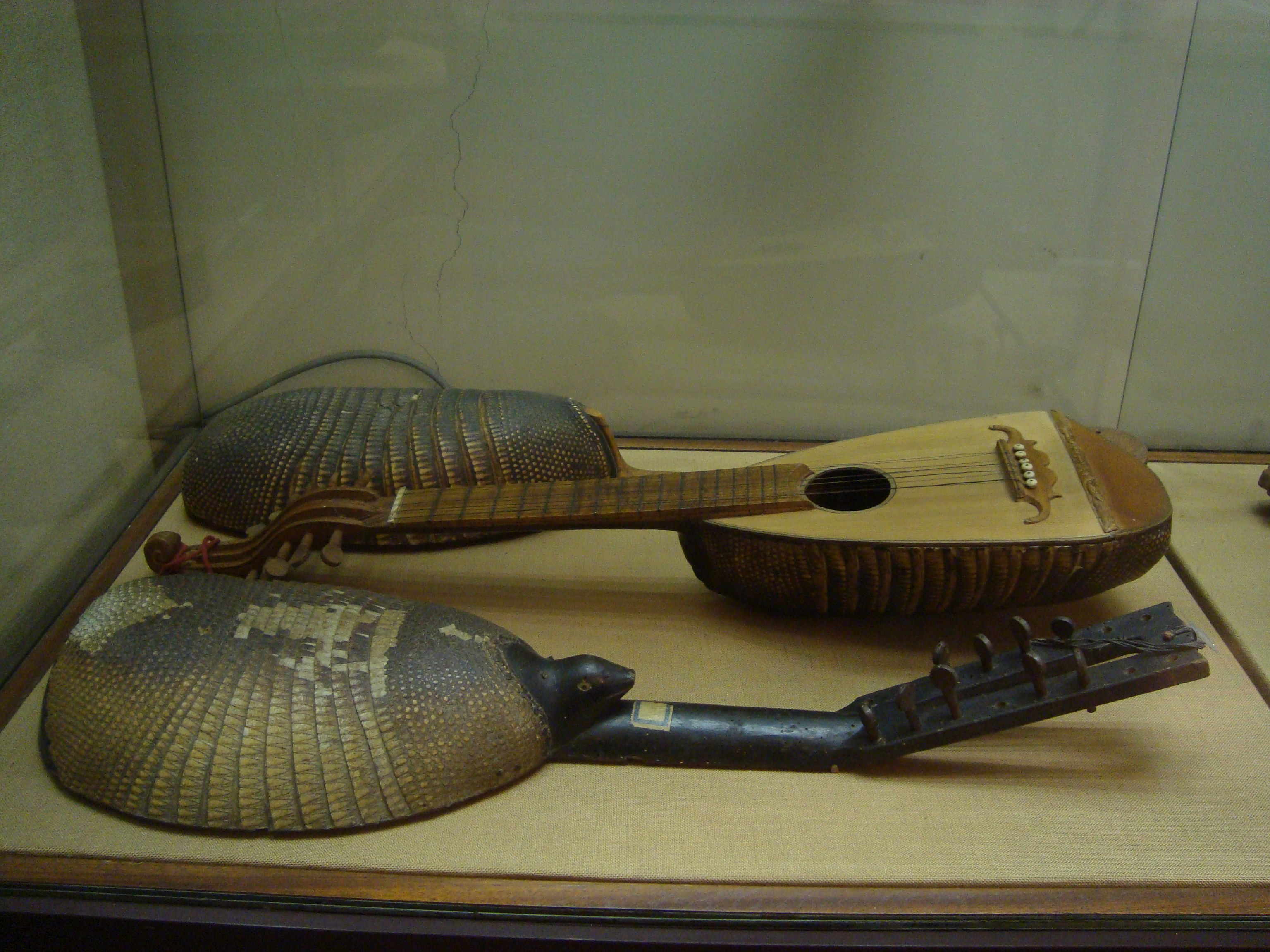
"Old charango", has shape of mandolin or bandurria

In Mexico, the Concheras lute tradition may date to the Spanish Conquest in the 16th century. Native Americans imitated the European instruments, making their own. Sounds boxes were made from armadillo shells, from calabash gourds, and from strips of wood like the lute. The dancers who use the Concheras (also known as conchas) call them "Mecahuehuetl" (from Nahuatl: Meca(tl) = chord + Huehue(tl)= old one "drum"). The tradition is rooted in the Otomi, Jonaz, Chichimeca, and Caxcan tribes.

As Christians tried to suppress the native's religion, the instruments became a tool to preserve music. Early Concheros dancers were able to incorporate the precolumbian dance and drum rhythms into the music made on the guitars and lutes. A traditional conchero can tell which step should be carried out by how the melody is being strummed on the conchas.

Modern instruments include the mandolina conchera, vihuela conchera, and guitarra conchera. The vihuela and guitar types are tuned using reentrant tuning, each course having two strings an octave apart.

==== Charango ====
The charango was developed in what is now Bolivia and Peru. Adapted from European styles such as vihuela and round-backed mandolin (or earlier types such as bandurria or mandore). Native Americans have been credited with using armadillo hide to create a round back, which is made of wood in modern times. The instrument is widespread throughout the Andean regions of Bolivia, Peru, Ecuador, northern Chile and northwestern Argentina, where it is a popular musical instrument that exists in many variant forms.

Two sizes are common: The smallest is the Walaycho (also hualaycho, maulincho, or kalampiador) with a scale typically around 30 cm long (up to about 56 cm with mechanical tuners). It has ten strings, which may be of metal, nylon, or nylon fishing line, arranged in five courses of two strings each. The Charangón (also charangone) is larger, in effect a tenor charango. About 75 cm long by 22 cm wide with a 42–51 cm scale.

A flat-backed version has been developed, the hatun charango or "grand charango", an extended-range charango developed in Peru in the modern era. It has either seven or eight strings, all set in single string courses except for the third course, which is double-strung.

=== Gallery, Latin America, Indonesia, Philippines, Hawaii ===
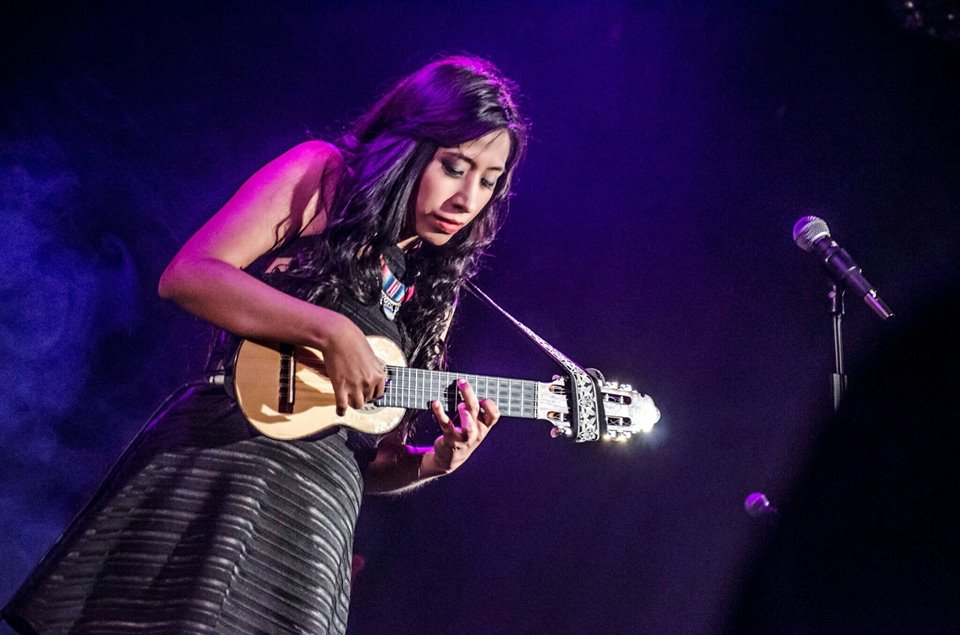
Bolivia. Luciel Izumi playing modern charango

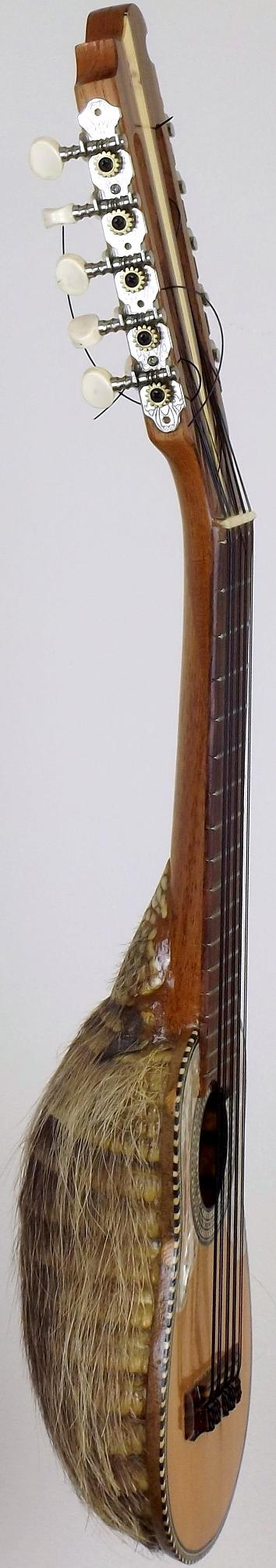
Bolivia. Charango, rounded back made from an armadillo

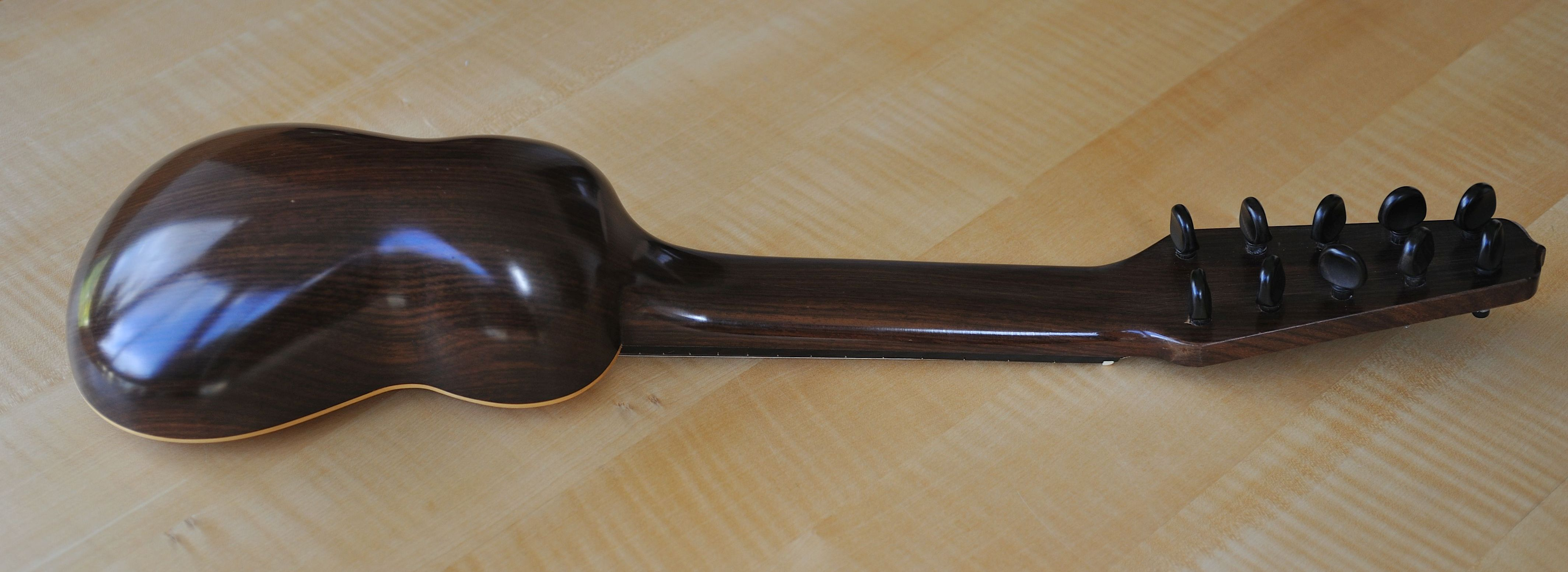
Modern charango with wood back

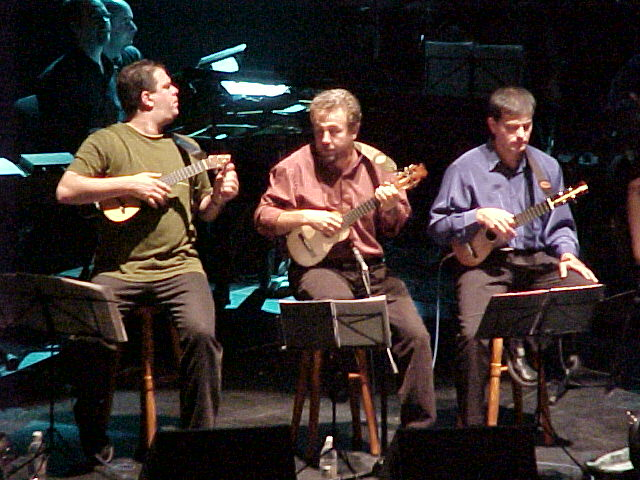
Canary Islands, Fuerteventura. timple

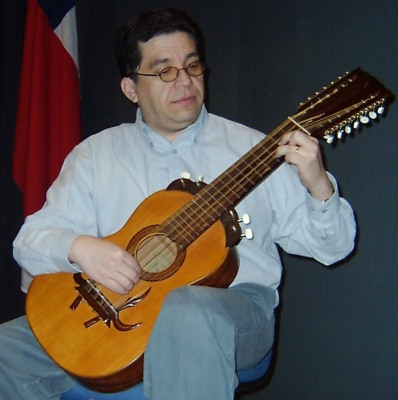
Chilean guitarron

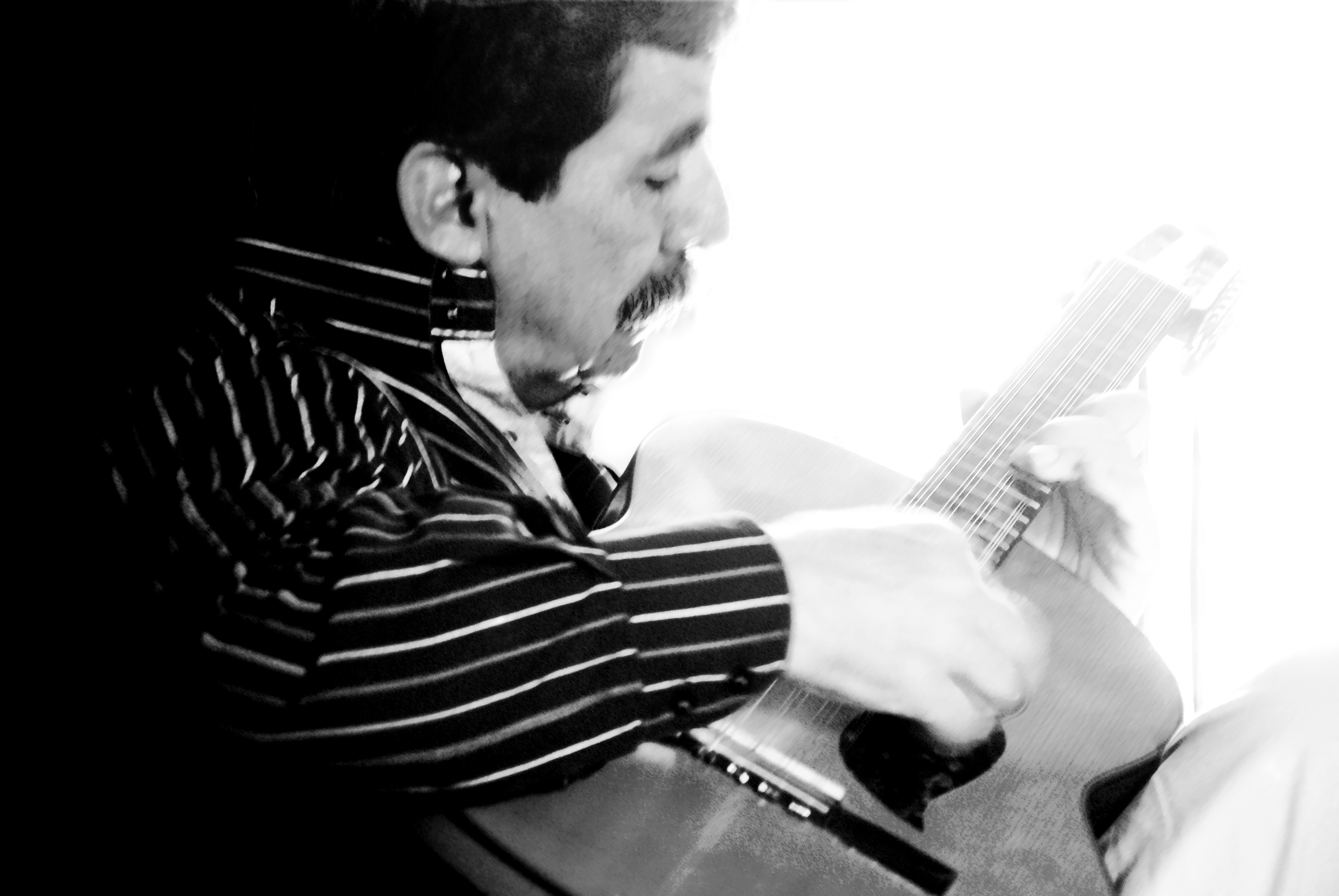
Colombia. Colombian tiple

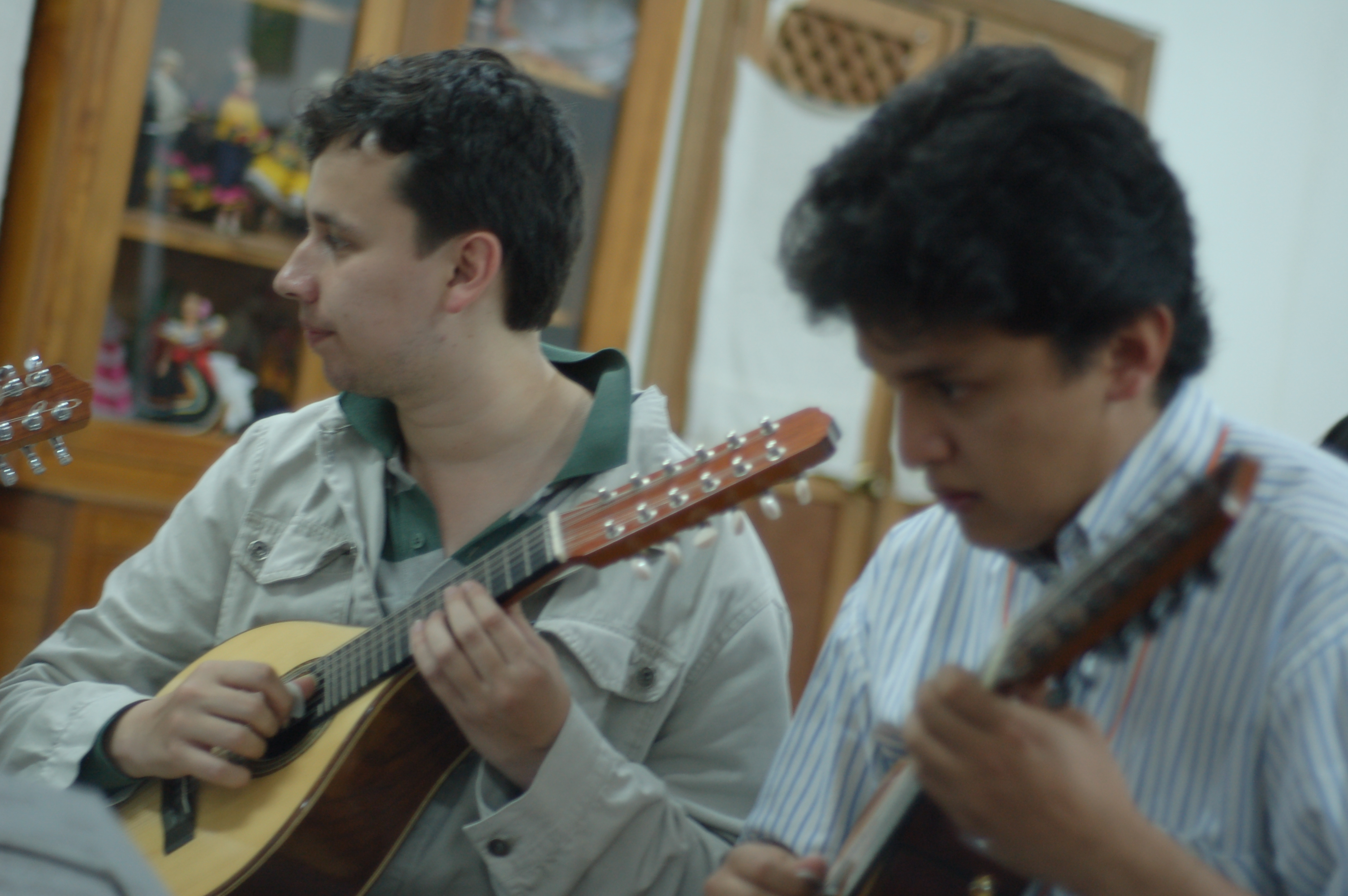
Columbia. Bandola andina

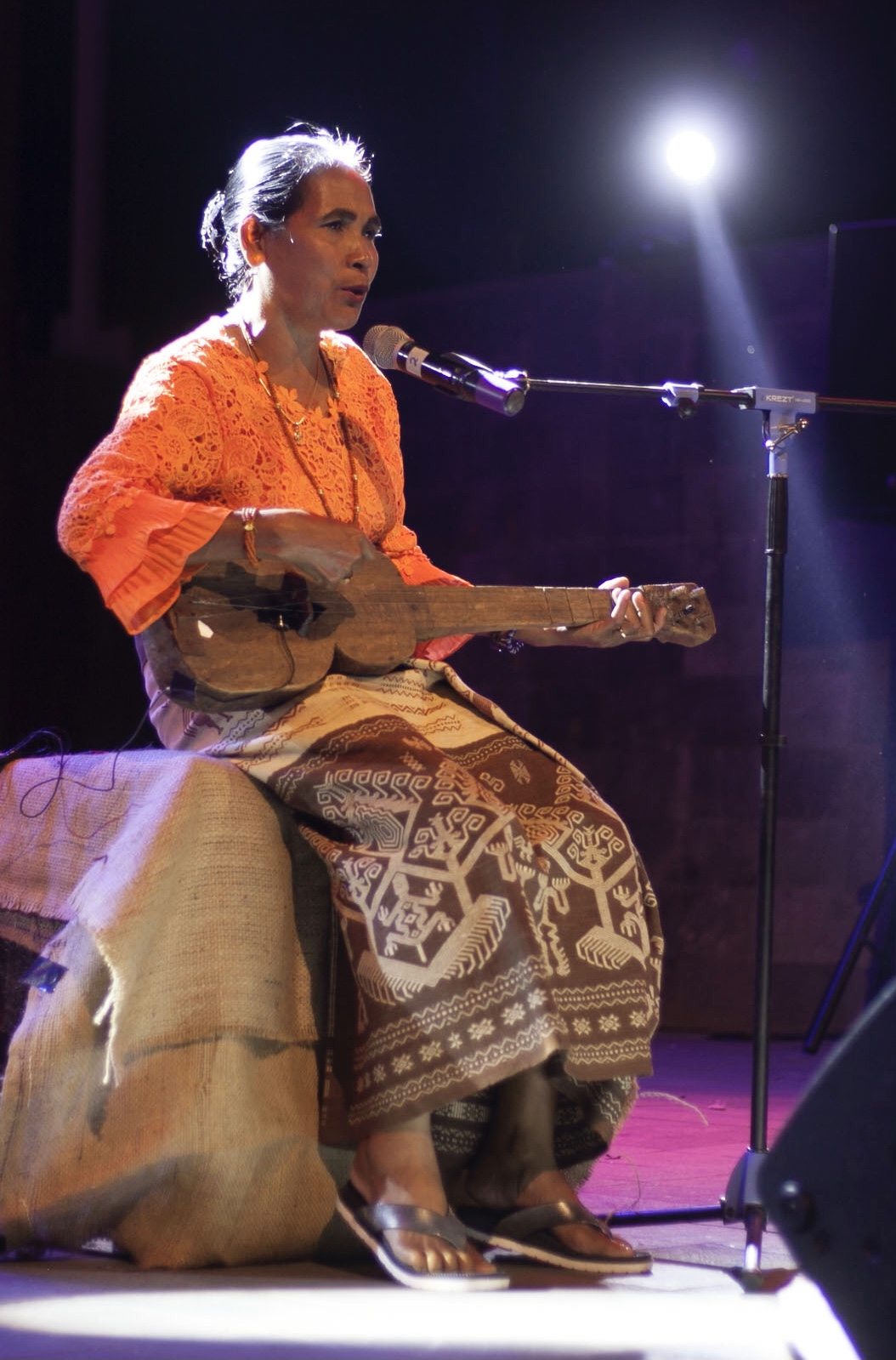
Sumba, Indonesia. Kahi Ata Ratu performing on the Junga. Originally a boat lute, this type was modeled after a Portuguese instrument.

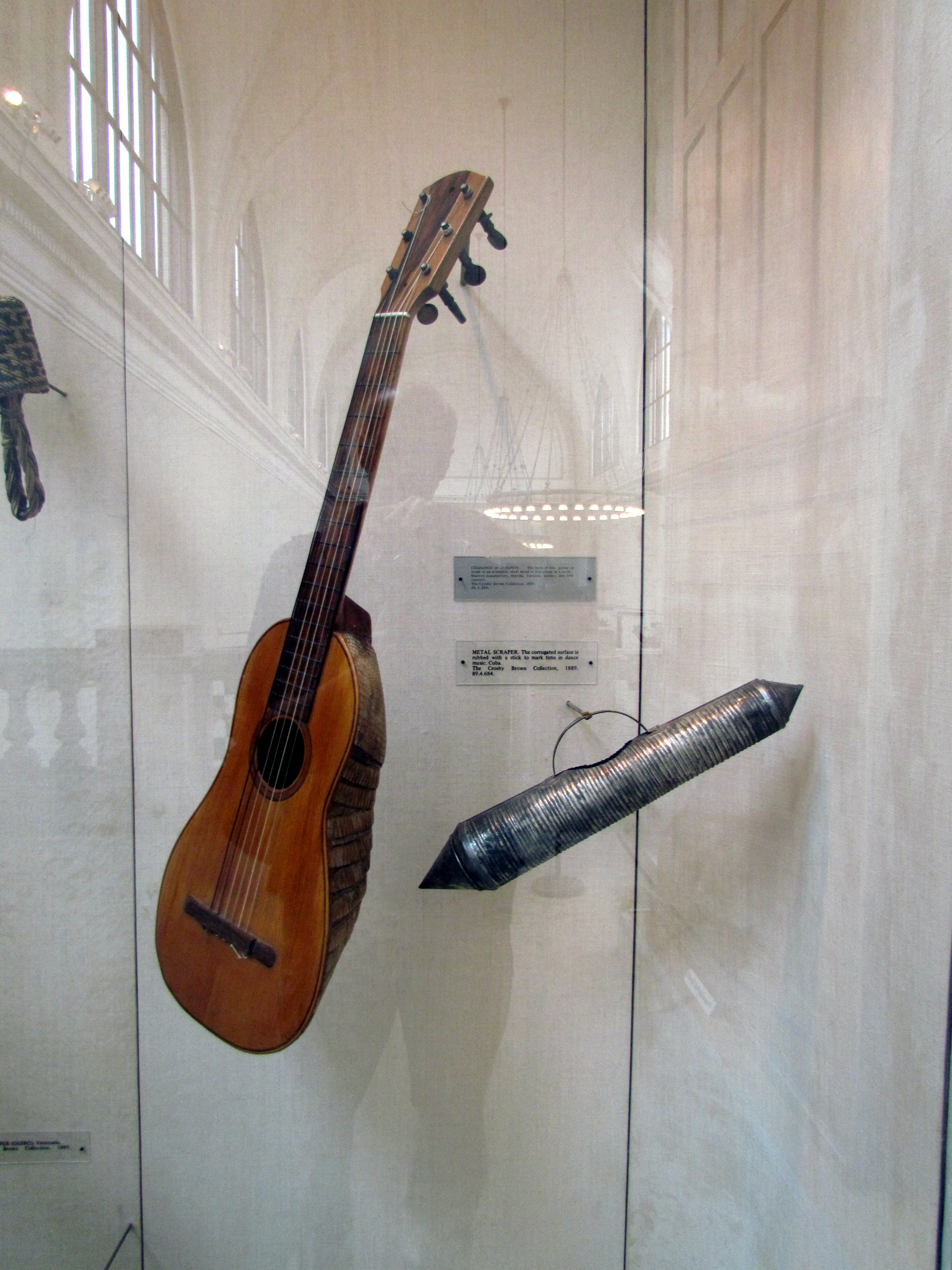
Merida, Yucatán, Mexico, 19th century. Six-stringed charanga or jamanita.

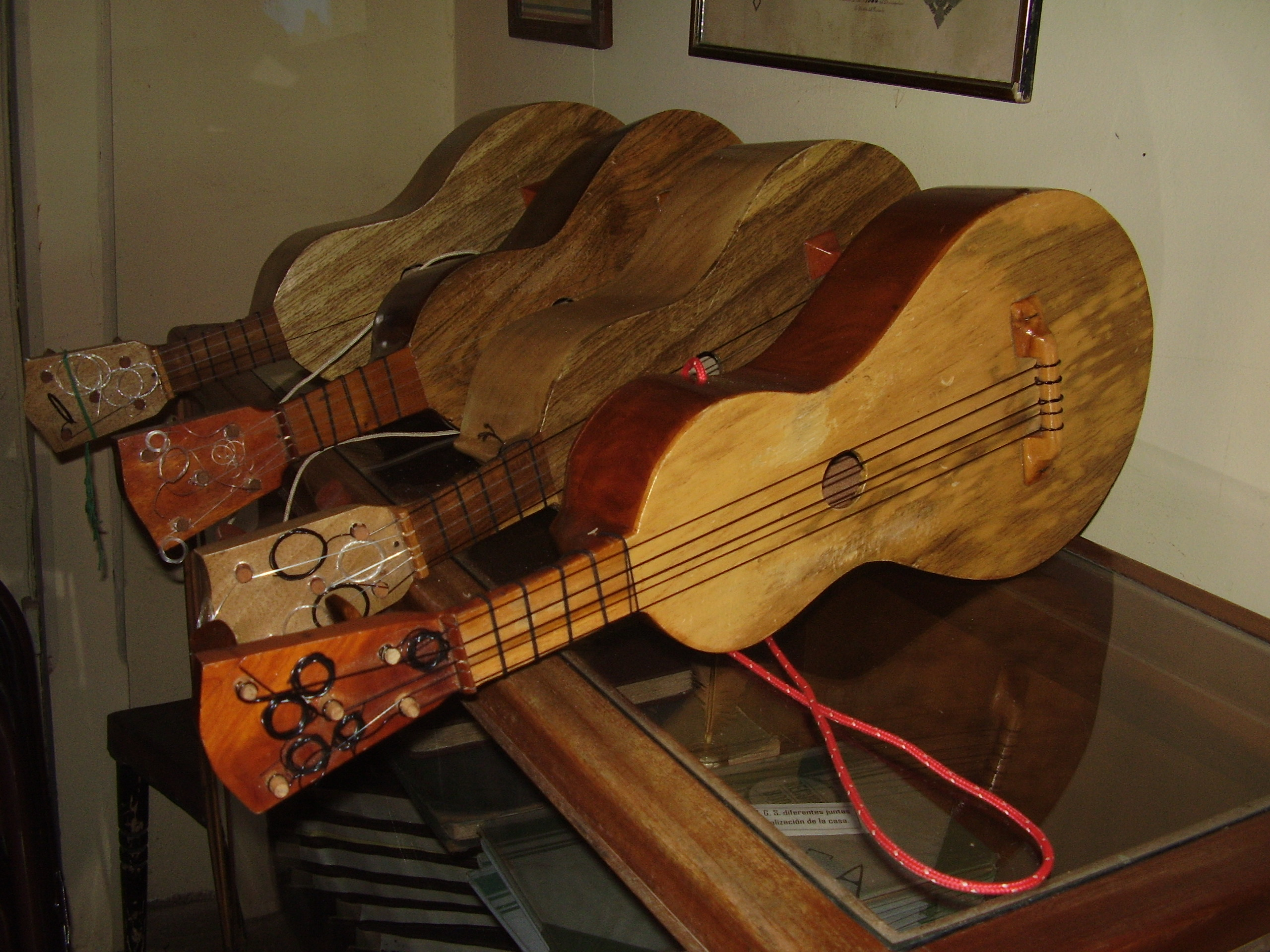
Panama. Mejorana

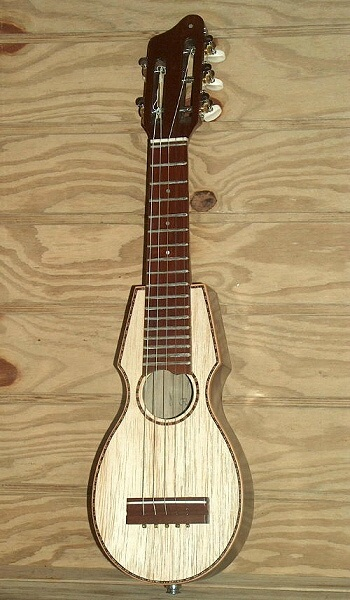
Puerto Rican tiple doliente

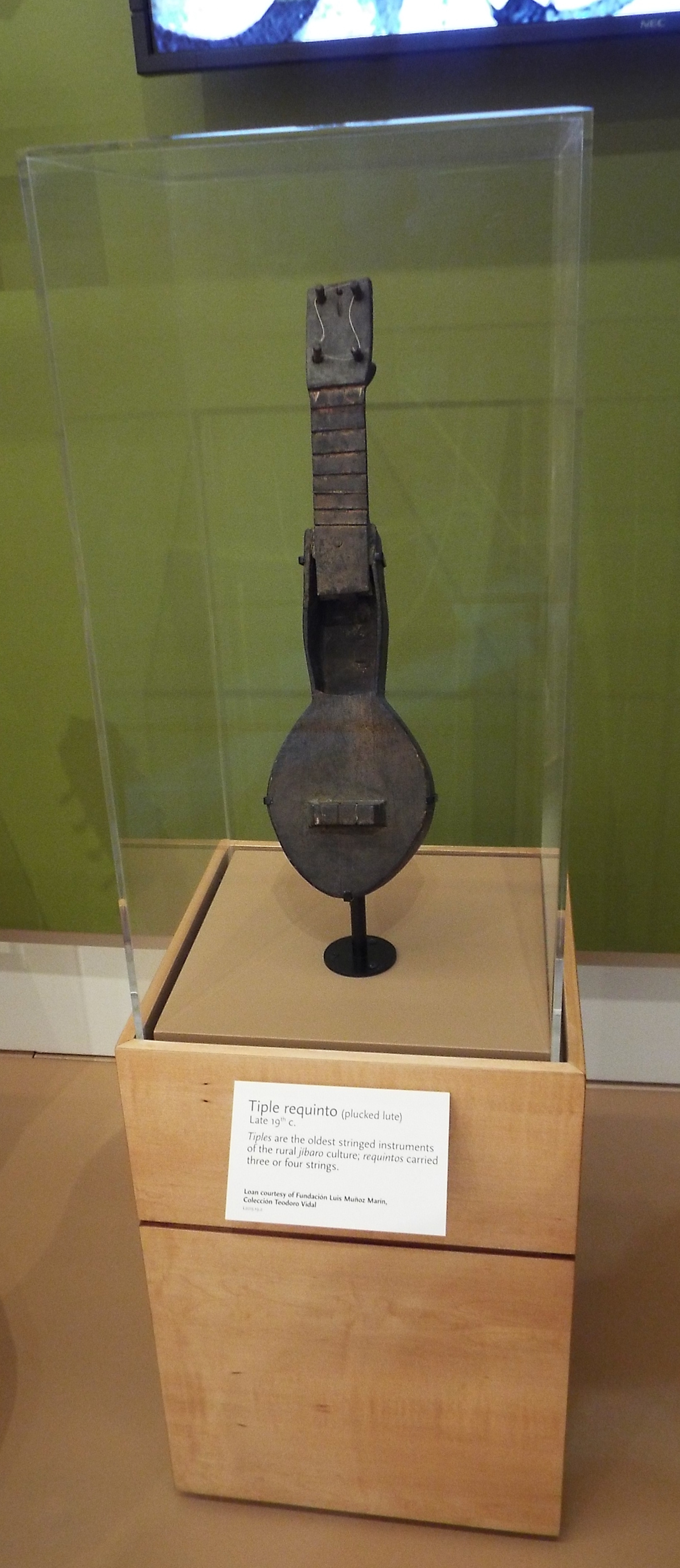
Puerto Rico, 19th century, tiple requinto

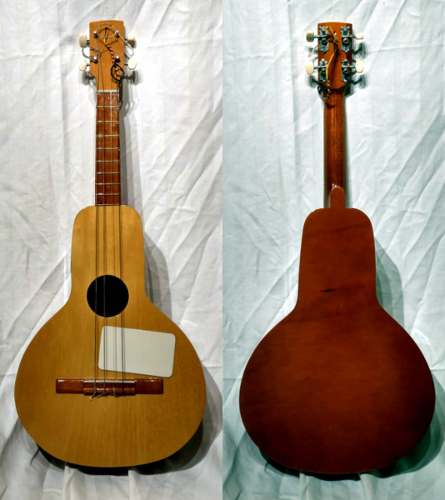
Venezuela. Bandol llanera

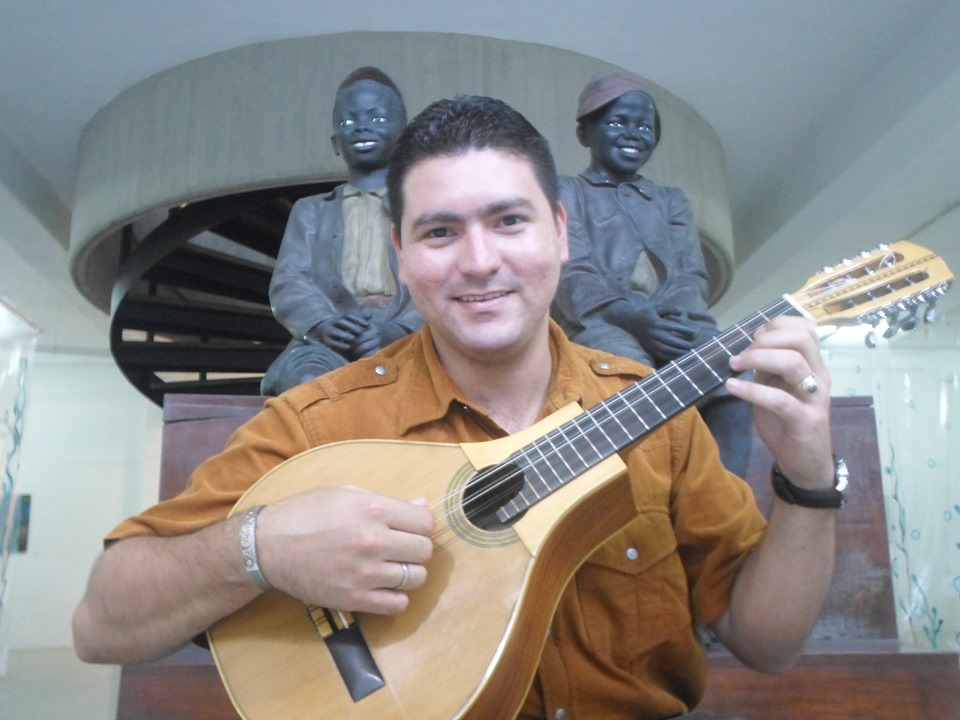
Venezuela. Bandola oriental
