= Hotel de l'Opera Hanoi =

Hotel in Hanoi, Vietnam

General information
- Location: Hoan Kiem District, Hanoi, Vietnam, 29 Trang Tien
- Opening: 2011
- Owner: Hanoi metropolitan government
- Management: Sofitel, Accor

Other information
- Number of rooms: 107
- Number of restaurants: 3 (La Fée Verte, Café Lautrec, Satine)

Website
- Official website

Hotel de l'Opera Hanoi is a 5 star hotel in Hanoi, Vietnam and under the MGallery Sofitel banner. Opened in 2011, the hotel was built in what was formerly the Dan Chu Hotel and Dan Chu Villa (both an early 20th Century hotel) and is state owned with management by Accor.

The 107 room hotel is housed in an unnamed French colonial era building located at 29 Trang Tien Street in Hoan Kiem District and is steps from the Hanoi Opera House and from the Hanoi's Old Quarter.

== Restaurants and bars ==
The hotel has 2 restaurants and 1 bar

- Café Lautrec serves French cuisine
- Satine serves vietnamese cuisine
- The bar La Fée Verte

== See also ==
- Sofitel Legend Metropole Hanoi - another Sofitel hotel in Hanoi
