= Hanoi Opera House =

Coordinates: 21°01′27″N 105°51′28″E

- Nhà hát Lớn Hà Nội
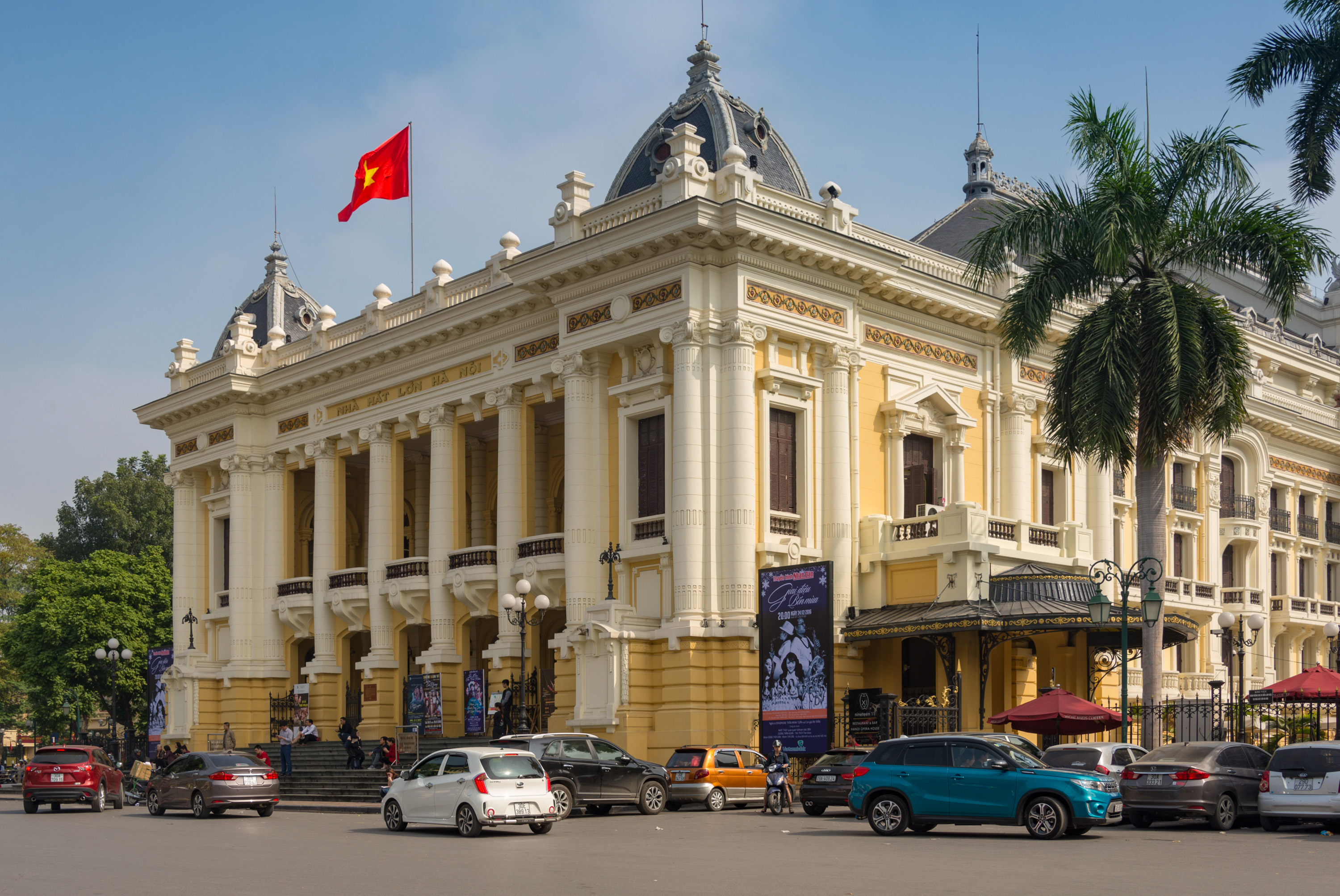

General information
- Status: Completed
- Type: Opera house, theater
- Architectural style: Neoclassical, eclecticism
- Location: 1 Tràng Tiền street, Cửa Nam ward, Hanoi, Vietnam
- Construction started: 7 June 1901
- Opened: 9 December 1911; 114 years ago
- Cost: ₣2 million, equivalent to US$11 million in 2026

Height
- Height: 34 m (112 ft)

Dimensions
- Other dimensions: length 87 m (285 ft) width 30 m (98 ft) area 2,600 m^{2} (0.6 acres)

Design and construction
- Architects: François Lagisquet, Broyer, Victorin Harlay
- Main contractor: Établissement de MM. Charavy et Savelon à Hanoï

Other information
- Seating capacity: 598

Website
- www.hanoioperahouse.org.vn

The Hanoi Opera House (French: Opéra de Hanoï), or the Grand Opera House (French: Grand Opéra, Vietnamese: Nhà hát Lớn Hà Nội) is an opera house in central Hanoi, Vietnam. It is located at August Revolution Square, anchoring the head of Tràng Tiền street.

Originally built by the French colonial administration as the Hanoi Municipal Theater (French: Théâtre municipal de Hanoï, Vietnamese: Nhà hát Thành phố Hà Nội) between 1901 and 1911, it is one of three opera houses built during the colonial period in French Indochina, alongside the Haiphong Opera House and Saigon Opera House.

== Building ==
One of Hanoi's most prominent architectural landmarks, the Hanoi Opera House was modeled on the Palais Garnier, the older of Paris's two opera houses, but with a smaller scale and using materials that are more suitable to the local environment. Built in the Neoclassical style with French Renaissance elements, the design was initially conceived by French architect Broyer and Chief Inspector of Public Buildings Victorin Harlay, and later fully realized by French architect François Lagisquet in collaboration with Harlay. Construction started in June 1901 and finished a decade later in December 1911.

A source of great municipal pride, the theater became the heart of French cultural life in Hanoi. The colonial government subsidized an opera company to sing each winter for local French residents, at the cost of the native taxpayer. However, the 870-seat theater stood mostly empty for the rest of the year, with only the occasional military band or touring soloist making brief appearances.

On 19 August 1945, a mass rally attended by hundreds of thousands took place at Theater Square in front of the Opera House, sparking the August Revolution which brought an end to the Japanese occupation of Indochina. In September 1945, Viet Minh leaders proclaimed the independence of the Democratic Republic of Vietnam from the Opera House balcony. The building also bore witness to street fighting during the subsequent Battle of Hanoi, as French forces recapture the city in December 1946.

The first session of the First National Assembly of Vietnam was held in the Opera House on 2 March 1946; as well as the second session on 28 October 1946 and the eleventh session on 18 December 1959, where the first and second Constitutions of the Democratic Republic of Vietnam were passed. The Opera House continued to serve as the seat of the National Assembly until the construction of Ba Đình Hall in 1963.

By the end of the 20th century, the Opera House had fallen into serious disrepair after more than 80 years of operation. The base of the theater walls was covered with moss, and many of the original roof tiles have been haphazardly replaced with corrugated iron. The interior decorations, service amenities and technical equipment have all become severely outdated; many decorative patterns were painted over with lime during previous repairs. New construction around August Revolution Square disrupted the architectural surroundings of the theater.

In the mid-1990s, in preparation for the 7th Francophone Summit being held in Hanoi in November 1997, the Vietnamese government embarked on a comprehensive renovation of the Opera House, with a budget of 156 billion đồng (14 million USD) partially supported by French funding. The project began in 1995 and was completed two years later, with the participation of 100 workers under the supervision of French-Vietnamese architect Hồ Thiệu Trị, author of the restoration plan.

The Hanoi Opera House provides the names for the neighboring Hilton Hanoi Opera Hotel which opened in 1999, as well as for the MGallery Hotel de l'Opera Hanoi which opened in 2011. For historical reasons associated with the Vietnam War, the Hilton Hanoi Opera Hotel was not named the Hanoi Hilton.

Since 31 January 2026, the Opera House has been closed for another two-year renovation.

== The opera company ==
=== Colonial period ===
The Opera House is described in the memoirs of Blanche Arral, who performed in the new Hanoi Opera House while waiting for the 1902 Exposition de Hanoi to open. The opera had depended on touring artists, performing French and Italian repertoire during the colonial period for a mainly French audience.

=== The Vietnam National Opera and Ballet (VNOB) ===
After the departure of the French, the building was used for Vietnamese plays and musicals. The return of Western opera, and the first major non-French or Italian opera, was a performance of Tchaikovsky's Eugene Onegin organised under Vietnamese-Soviet cultural auspices in 1960, where the Russian vocal coach selected an untrained singer, Quý Dương, as a fit for the baritone title role.

Today, the orchestra of the opera overlaps with the Vietnam National Symphony Orchestra, and calls on the Hanoi Philharmonic Orchestra of the Hanoi Conservatory. Famous singers of the company include the Tchaikovsky Conservatory-trained soprano Lê Dung, the youngest-ever person to be awarded People's Artist of Vietnam in 1993.

The Opera House has seen many premieres of operas and musicals by Vietnamese composers: the operas of Đỗ Nhuận, including Cô Sao ('Miss Sao') in 1965, Người tạc tượng ('The Sculptor') in 1971 and Nguyễn Trãi in 1980; the works of revolutionary composer Lưu Hữu Phước; the choral works of film composer Đặng Hữu Phúc; as well as works by returning emigre composers such as Nguyễn Thiên Đạo, a Parisian pupil of Olivier Messiaen.

The National Ballet is also part of the Opera House company. It stages Western classics such as Swan Lake, as well as traditional and modern Vietnamese dance productions.

== Gallery ==
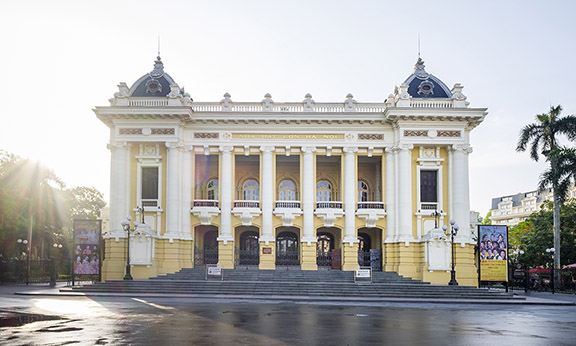

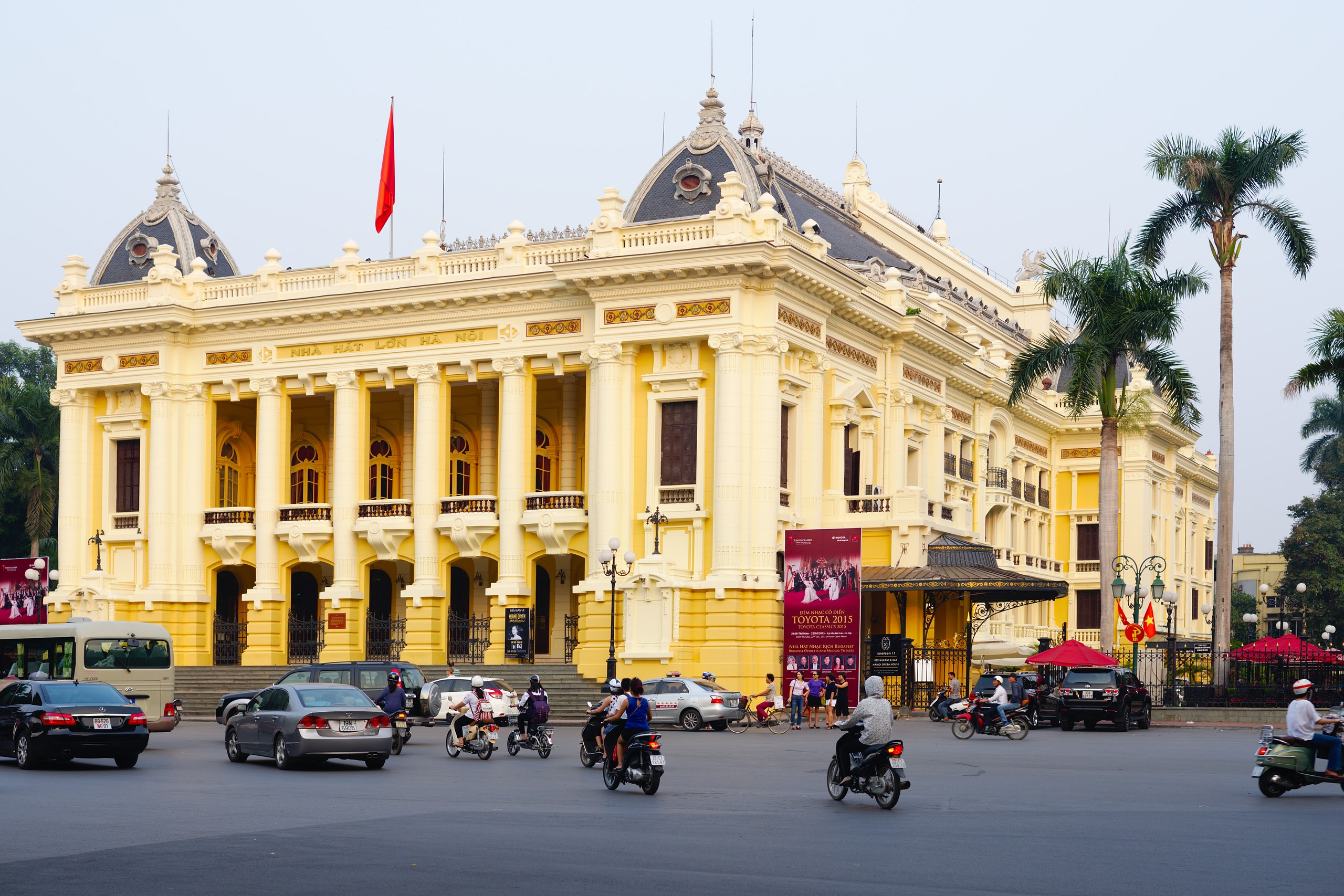

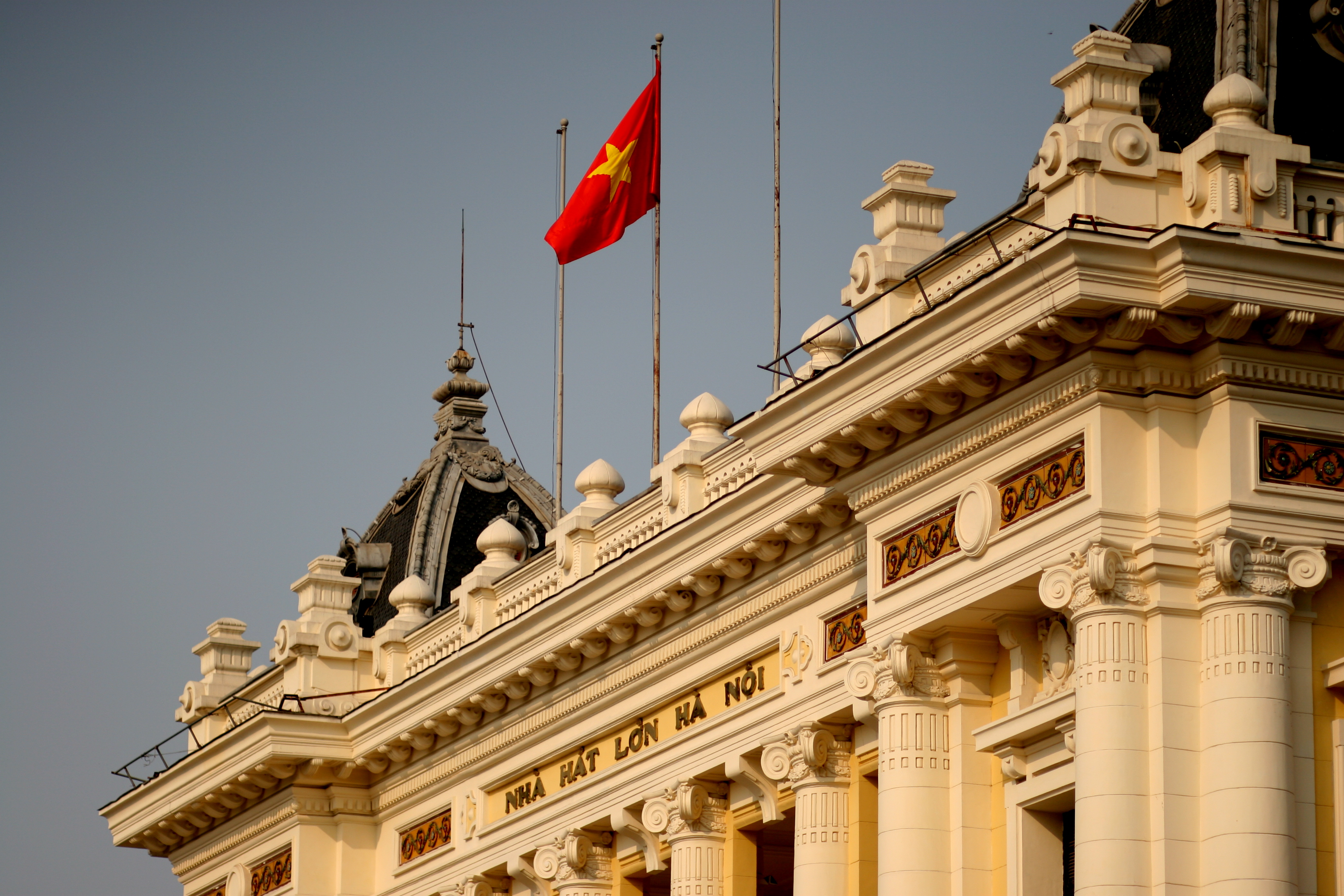

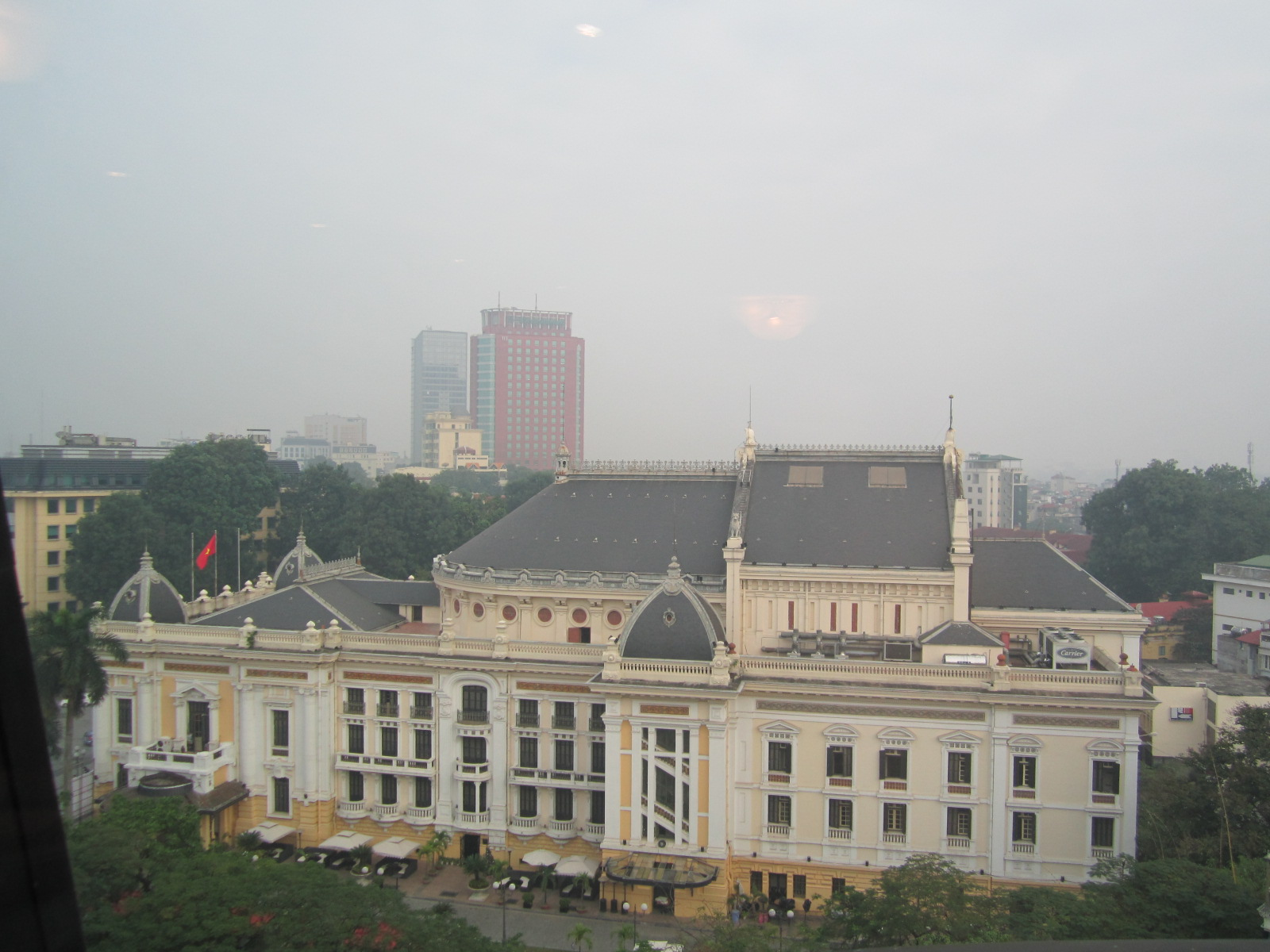

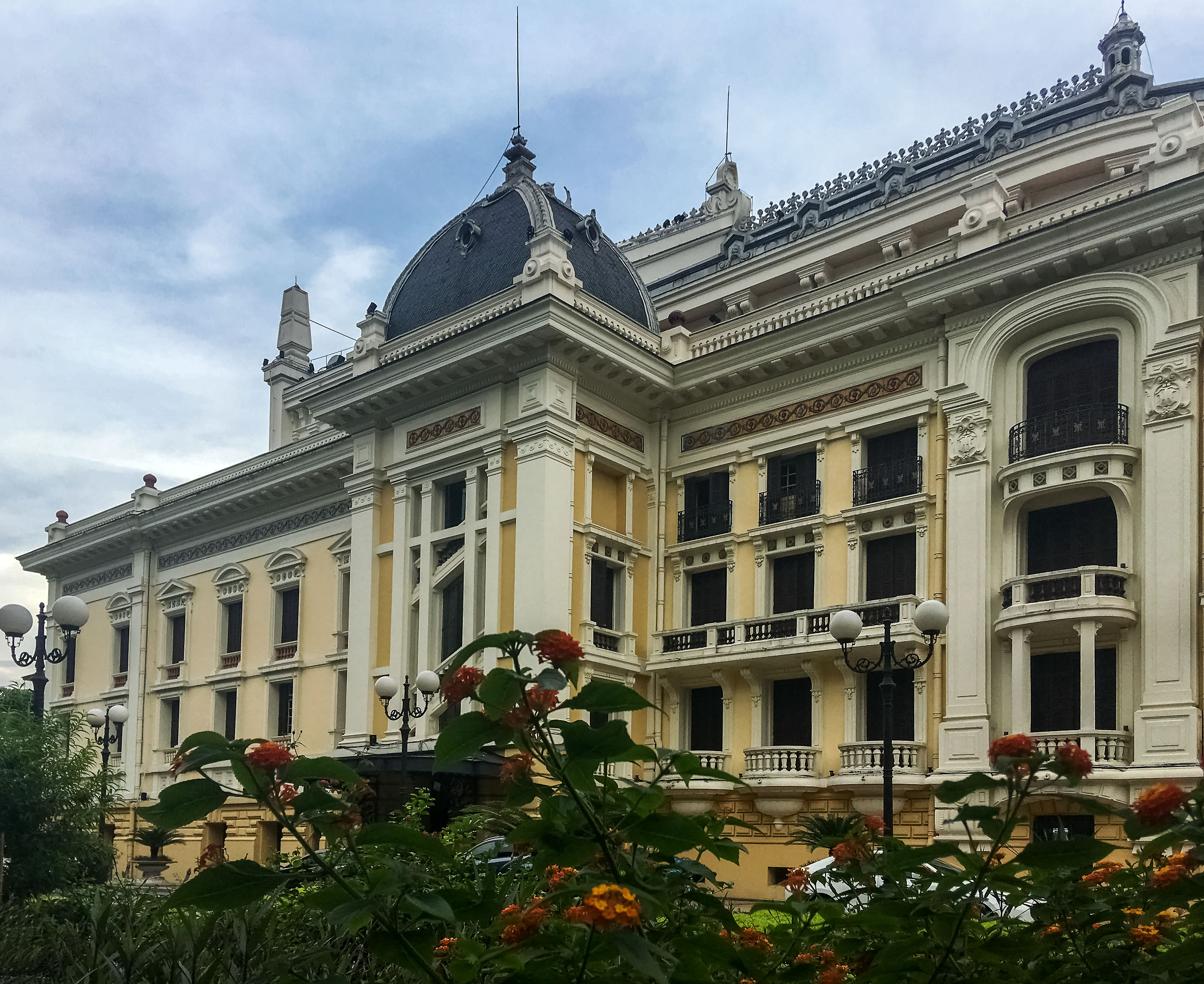

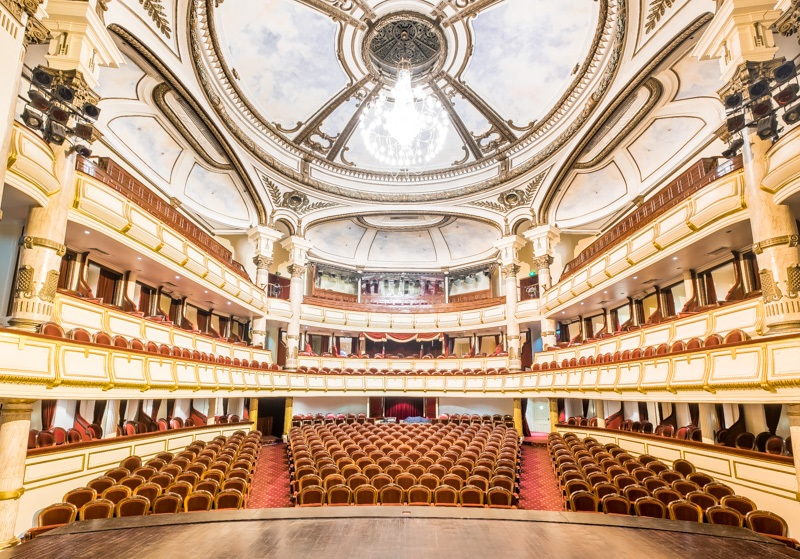

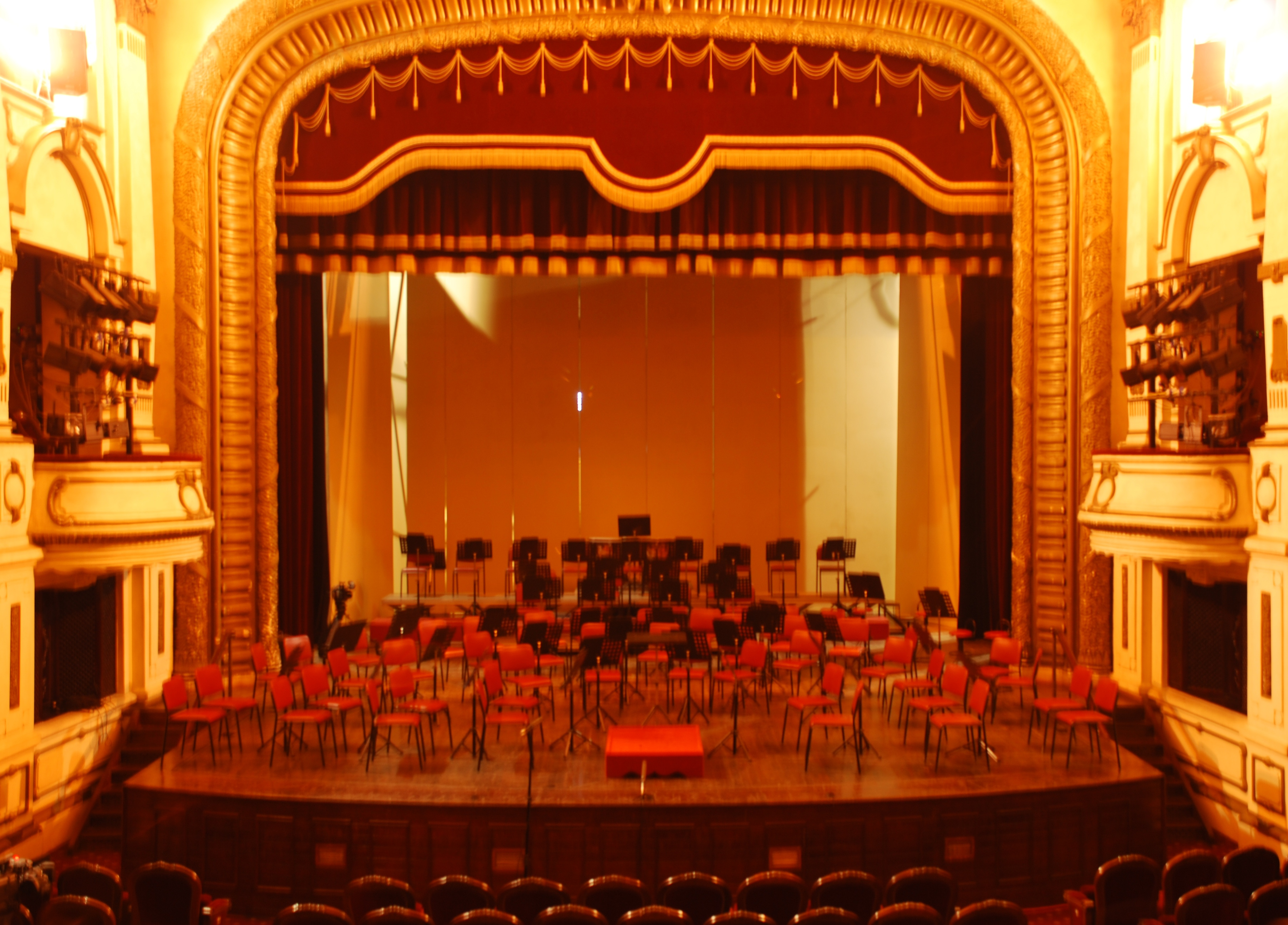

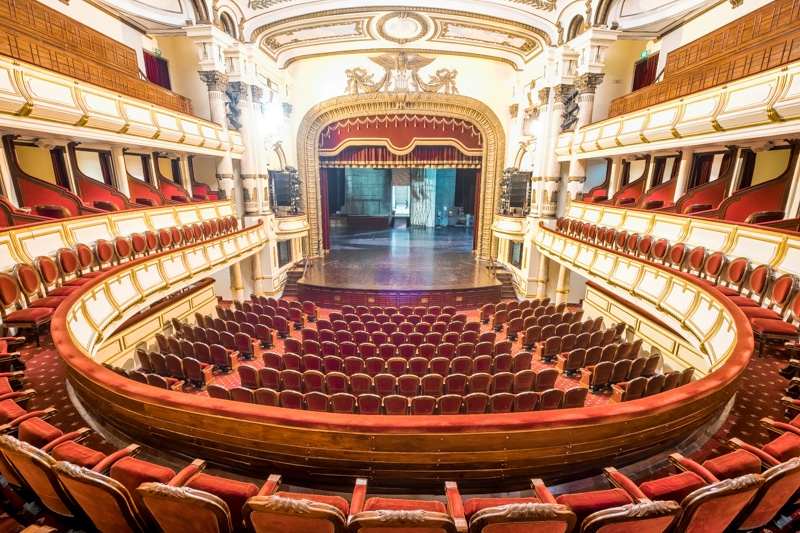

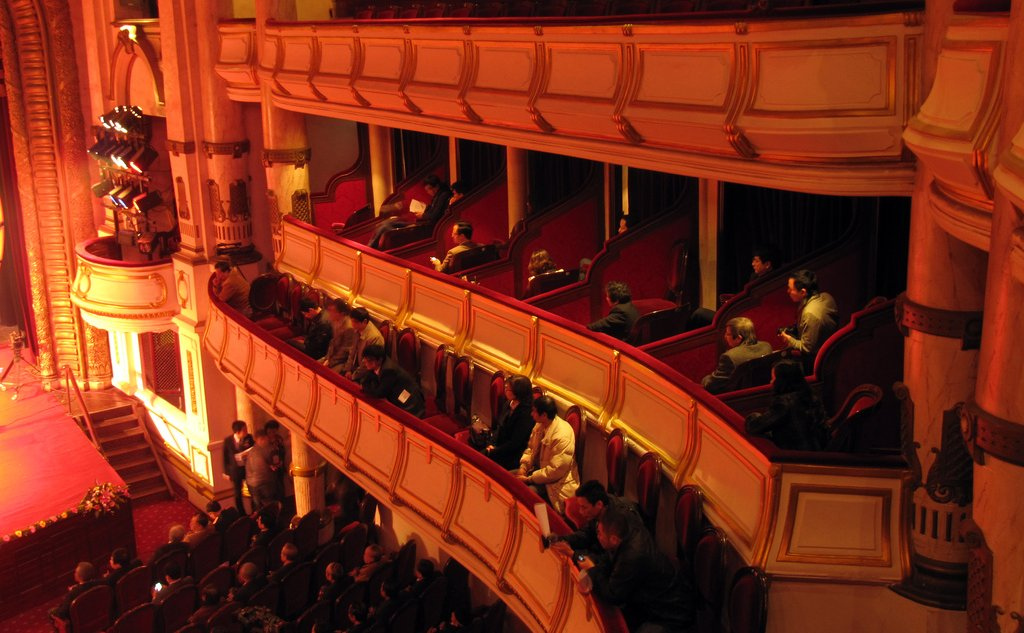

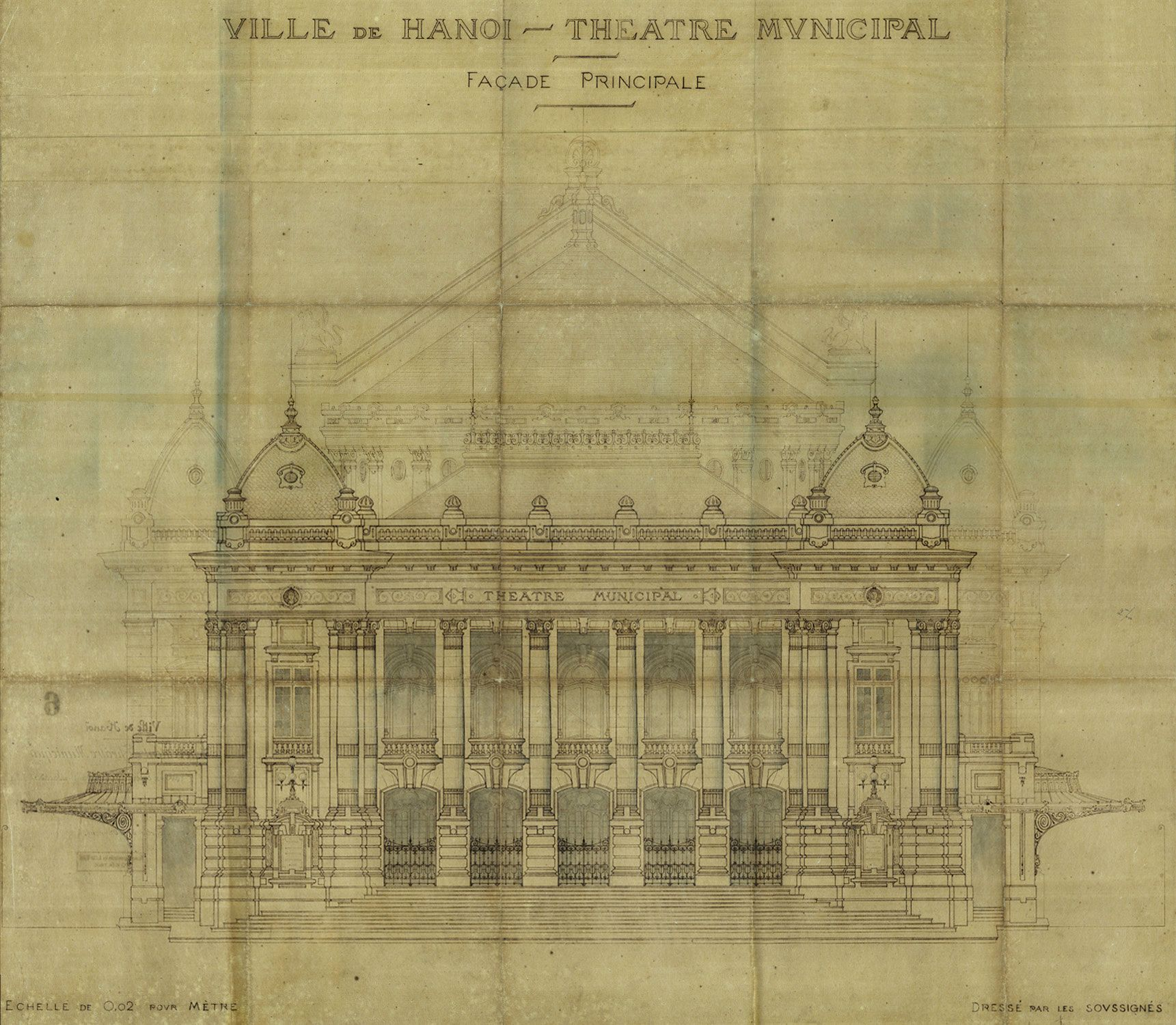

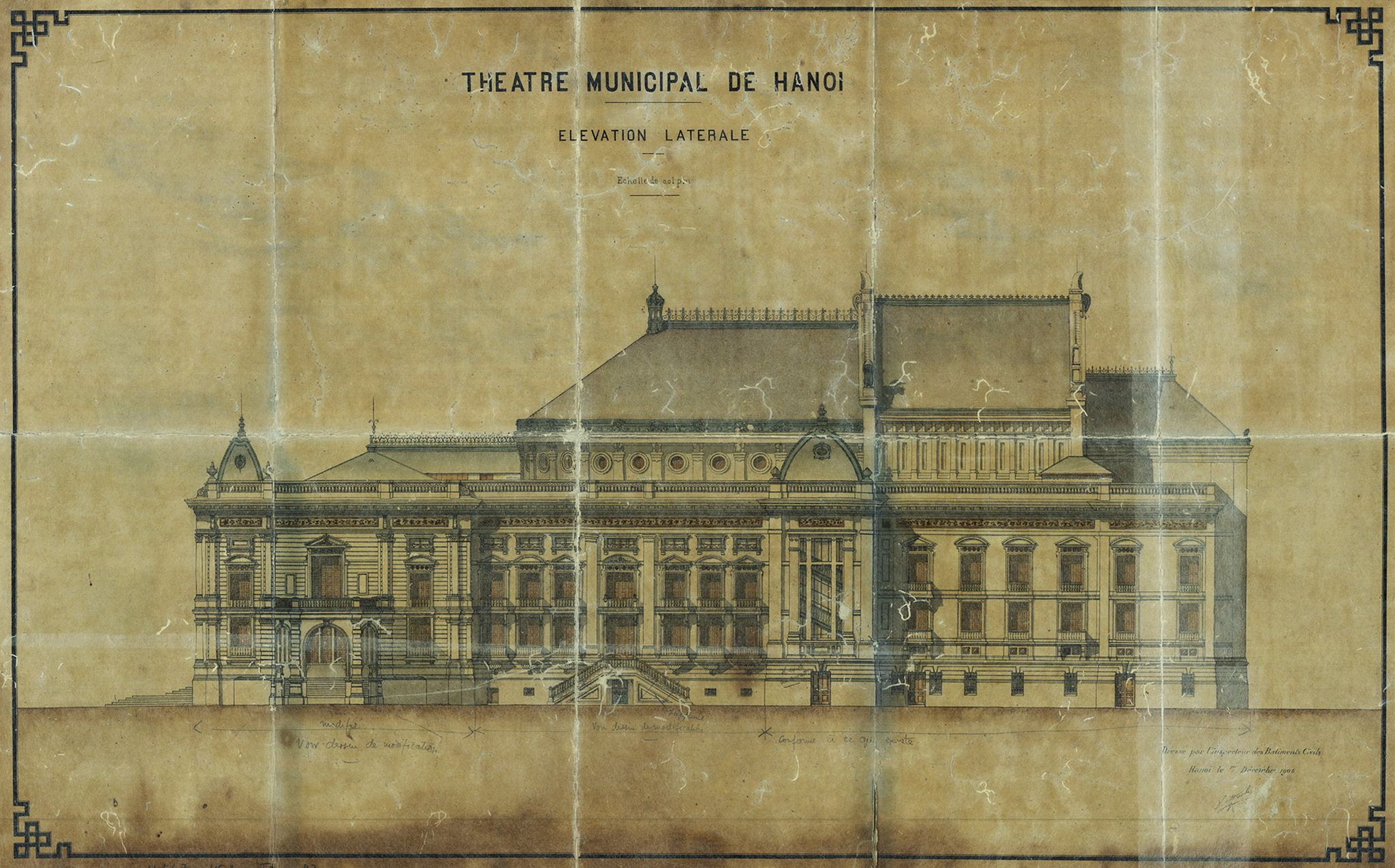

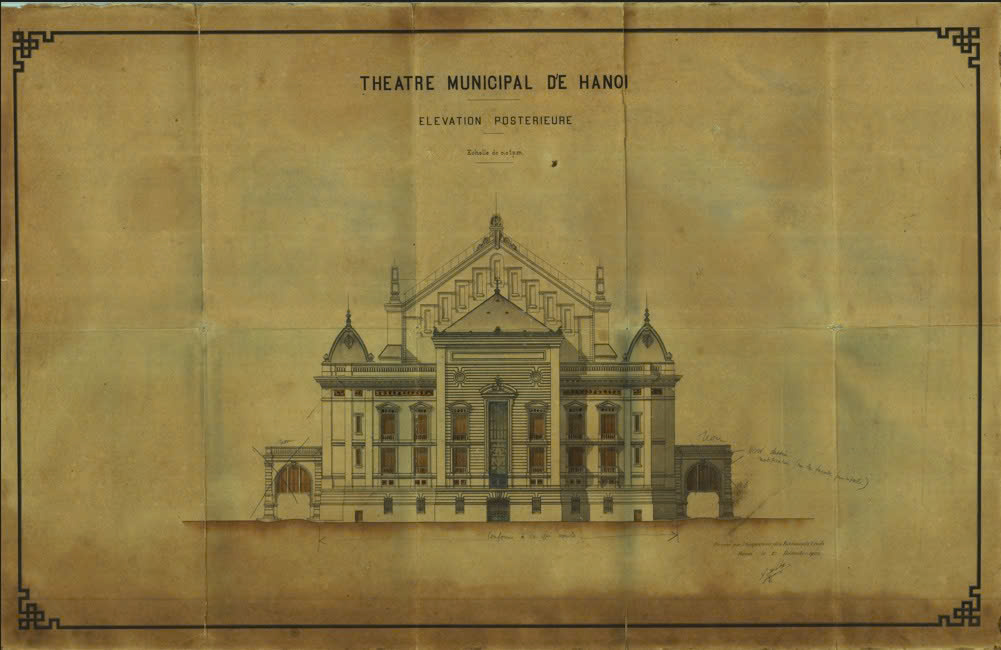

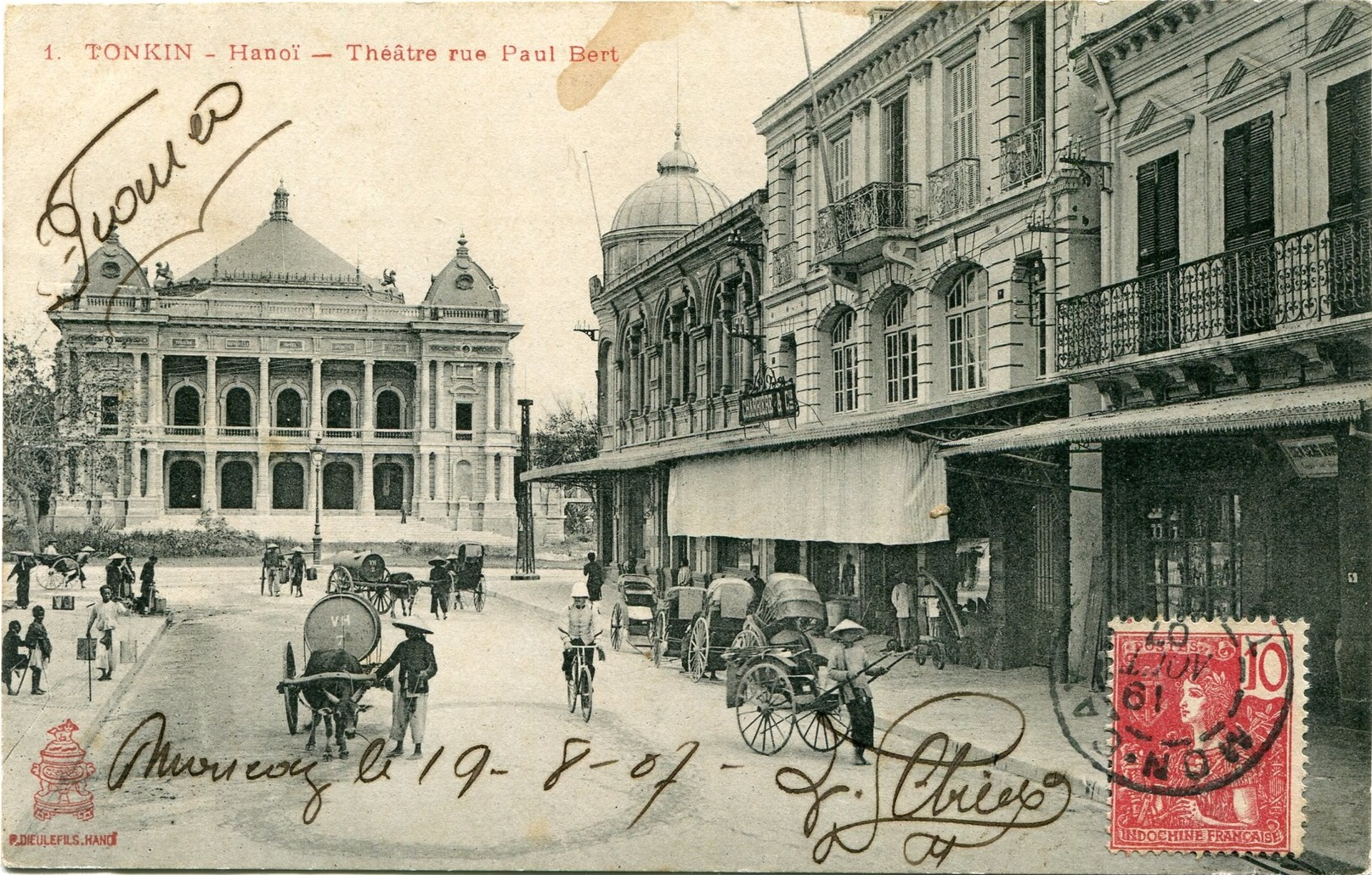

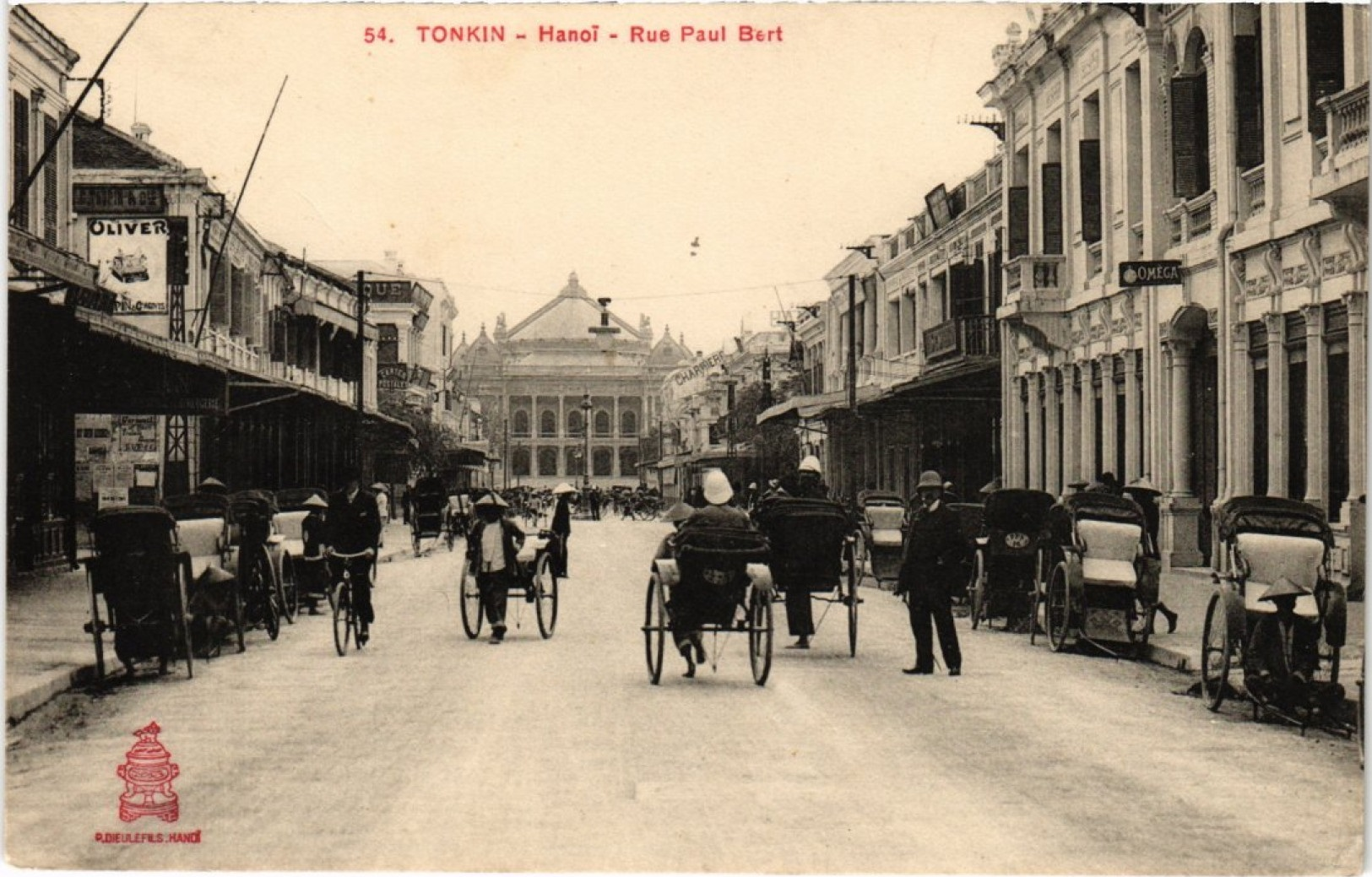

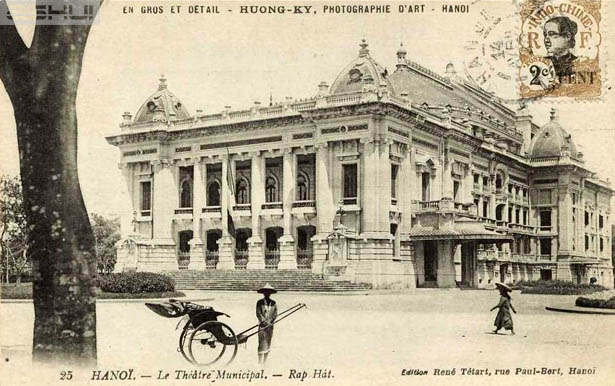

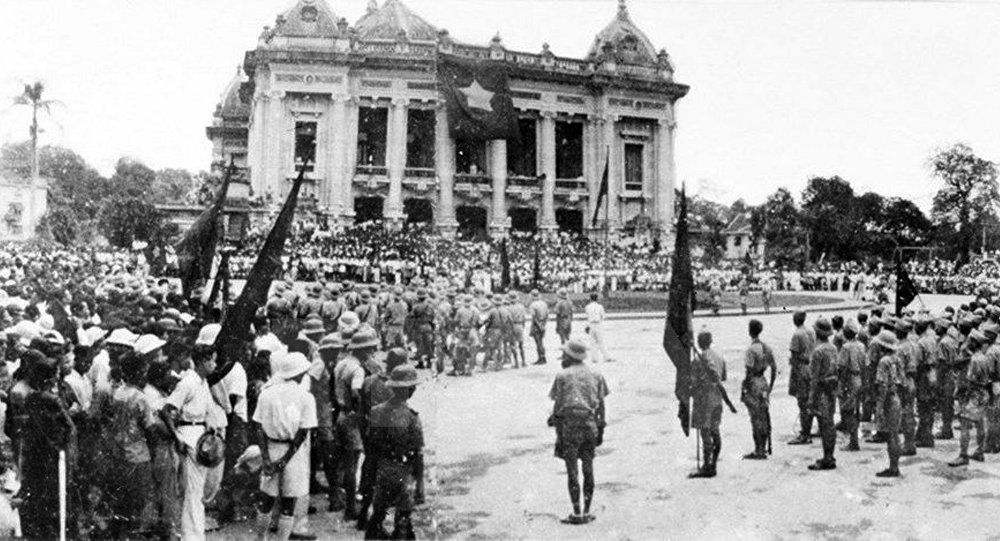

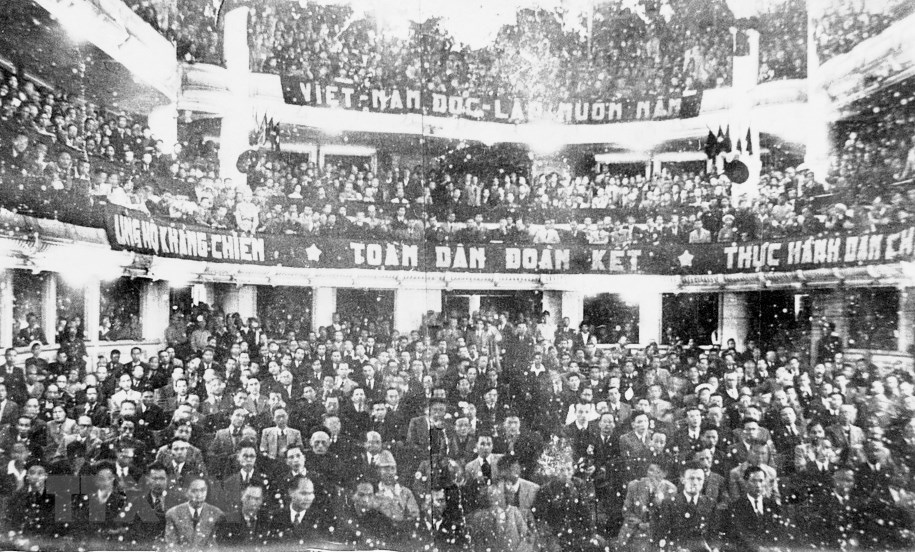

== See also ==
- Grand Palais (Hanoi)

Smaller French theaters built around the same time:

- Saigon Opera House
- Haiphong Opera House
