= Ho Chi Minh City Opera House =

Municipal opera house in Vietnam

Saigon Opera House
- Nhà hát Thành phố
- The opera house in 2008
- Alternative names: Municipal Opera House

General information
- Status: Completed
- Type: Opera house, municipal theater
- Architectural style: Flamboyant
- Location: 7 Lam Son Square, Saigon ward, Ho Chi Minh City, Vietnam
- Coordinates: 10°46′36.12″N 106°42′11.59″E
- Construction started: 1898
- Opened: 1 January 1900; 126 years ago
- Renovated: 1955, 1998, 2007–2009
- Renovation cost: VND$25 billion (~US$3.3 million in 2024)

Design and construction
- Architect: Félix Olivier
- Civil engineer: Ernst Guichard; Eugène Ferret

Other information
- Seating type: Cushion
- Seating capacity: 500
- Public transit: 1 Opera House station

Website
- saigonconcert.com

Saigon Opera House (Vietnamese: Nhà hát Thành phố, French: Théâtre Municipal de Saïgon) is a municipal opera house in downtown Saigon, now Ho Chi Minh City, Vietnam. Like other French-built opera houses during French colonial period, including the ones in Hanoi and Haiphong, it is an example of French colonial architecture in Vietnam.

Designed by French architects as the Opéra de Saïgon, the building was completed in 1900. The 500-seat building served as the house of the unicameral National Assembly from 1956 until 1967. After the National Assembly became a bicameral legislature, the Opera House became home to the Lower House (Hạ Nghị Viện) and the Senate or Upper House (Thượng Nghị Viện) of the National Assembly of what was South Vietnam. It later hosted the People's Congress of Deputies (Đại hội đại biểu Nhân dân) of the Provisional Revolutionary Government of the Republic of South Vietnam in 1975. The Opera House was not used again as a theatre until 1976. The façade was restored in 1998.

== Architecture ==
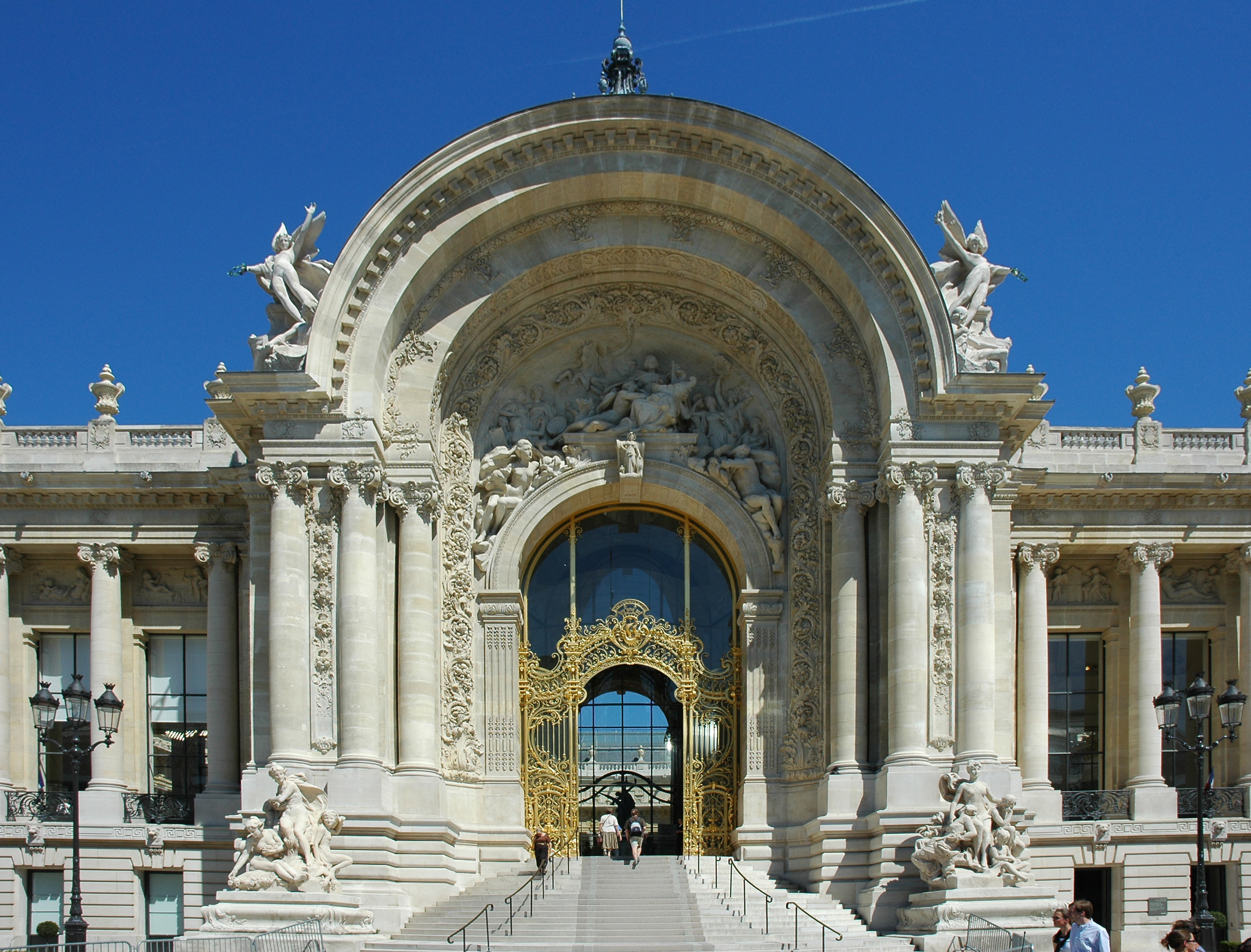
Façade of the Petit Palais in Paris

The Municipal Theatre owes its specific characteristics to the work of architect Félix Olivier, while construction was under supervision of architects Ernest Guichard and Eugène Ferret in 1900. Its architectural style is influenced by the Flamboyant style of the French Third Republic, with the façade shaped like the Petit Palais, which was built in the same year in France. The house had a main seating floor plus two levels of seating above, and once was capable of accommodating 1,800 people. The design of all the inscriptions, décor, and furnishings were drawn by a French artist and sent from France.

In accordance with the architectural style employed, the façade of the theatre was decorated with inscription and reliefs (much like what is now the Ho Chi Minh City Hall), but it was criticized as being too ornate. In 1943 some of this decoration was removed, but a portion was restored by the city government for the 300th anniversary of Saigon in 1998. Today, the Opera House has a capacity of 500 seats.

== History ==
After the invasion and the colonization of Cochinchina, in 1863 French colonists invited a theatre company to Saigon to perform for the French legion in the villa of the French admiral at the Clock Square (Place de l'Horloge), presently the corner of Nguyen Du and Dong Khoi streets. After a short time, a temporary theatre was built at the site of what is now the Caravelle Hotel. In 1898, the construction of the new theatre commenced on the site of the old one, and it was completed by 1 January 1900.

Between the First and Second World Wars, all costs of mobilization and demobilization as well as other costs for the theatre companies from France to Saigon were paid by the municipal government. Despite the fact that the theatre was planned as an entertainment venue for the growing middle class, its audience declined as more and more night clubs and dance halls boomed in the city. During this period, performances were presented only occasionally, some being concerts and other cai luong programs.

Following criticisms of the theatre's façade and the high costs of organizing performances, the municipal government intended to turn the theatre into a concert hall (Salle de Concert), but this was never carried out. Instead, decorations, engravings and statues were removed from the theatre façade in 1943 to make the theatre look newer. In 1944, the theatre was damaged by the Allied aerial attacks against Imperial Japanese Army, and it stopped functioning. As Japan surrendered to the Allies, France returned to Indochina. Following the French defeat at the Battle of Dien Bien Phu and the signing of the Geneva Accords in 1954, the theatre became a temporary shelter for French civilians arriving from North Vietnam.

In 1955, the theatre was restored as the seat of the Lower House of the State of Vietnam, and later the Republic of Vietnam. After the Fall of Saigon in 1975, the Provisional Revolutionary Government started holding the People's Assembly at the theatre. After the Reunification of Vietnam in 1976, the building was restored to its original function as a theatre. In 1998, on the occasion of 300th anniversary of the founding of Saigon, the municipal government had the theatre façade restored.

In 2020, the Ho Chi Minh City Metro's Opera House Station opened to public viewing. Line 1 began operations in 2024.

== Gallery ==
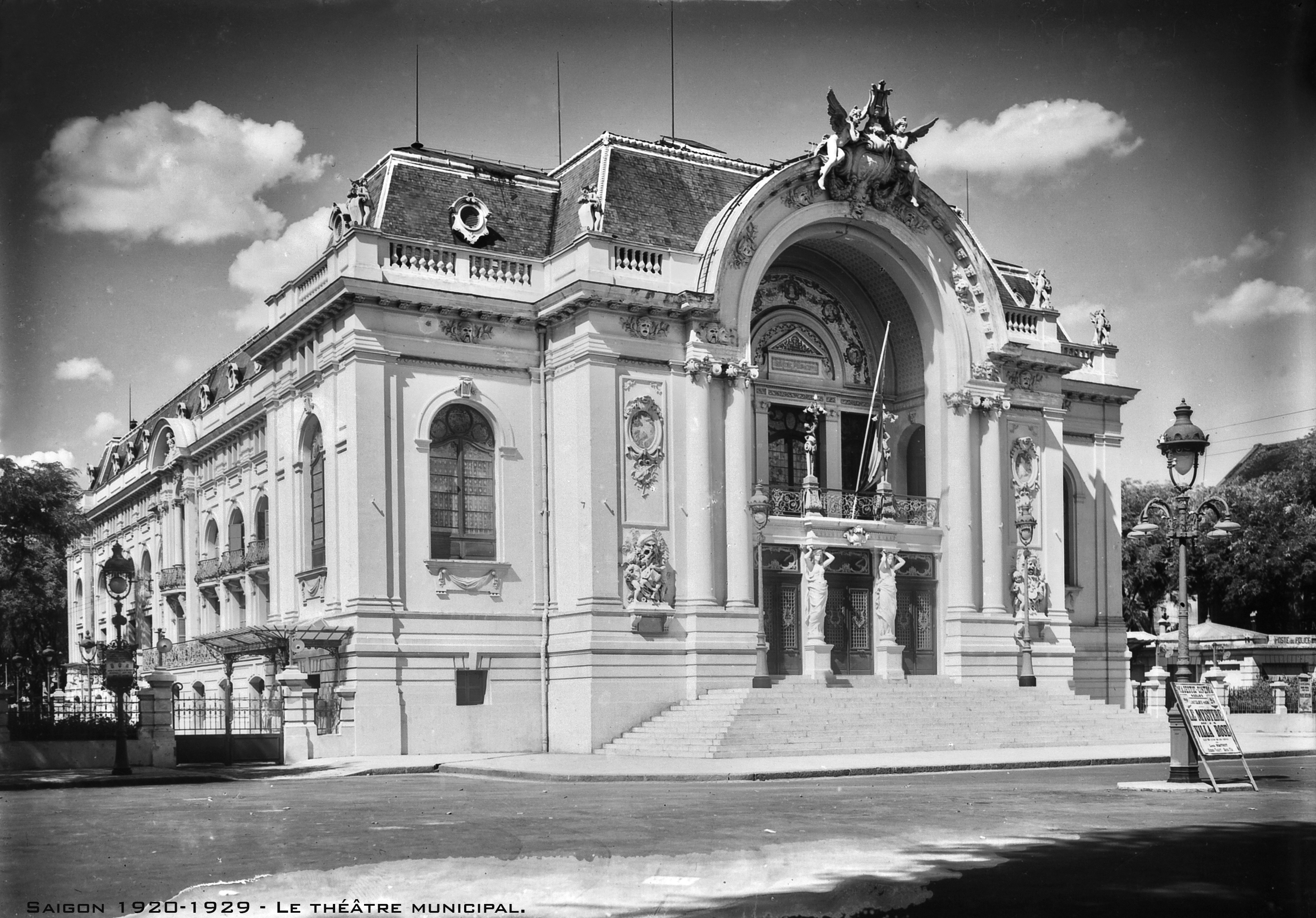
Side view of the Opera House in the 1920s

The Opera House in 1931

The Opera House as home to the National Assembly of the Republic of Vietnam (1964)

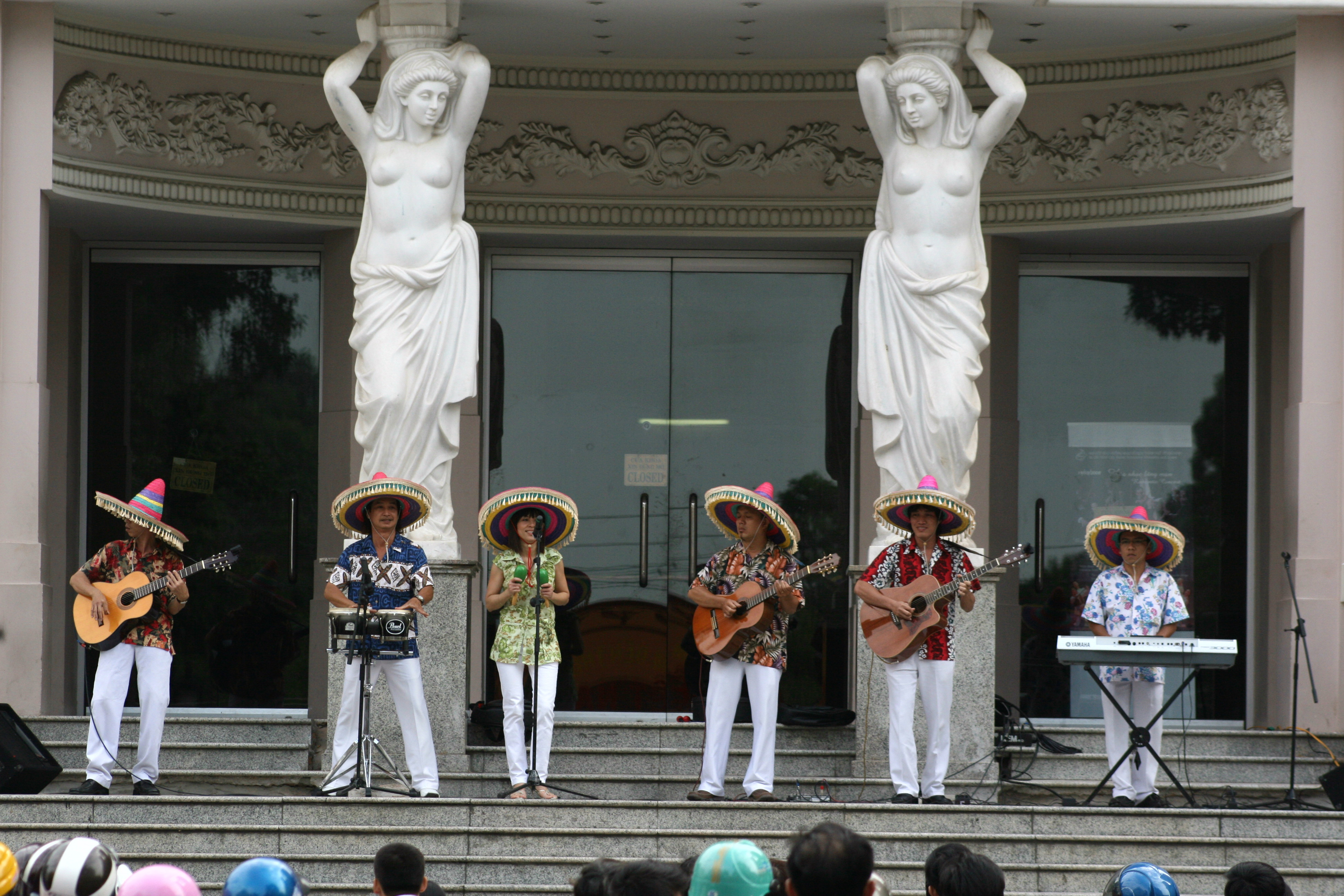
A public performance in front of the Opera House (2008)

Side view of the Opera House (2013)

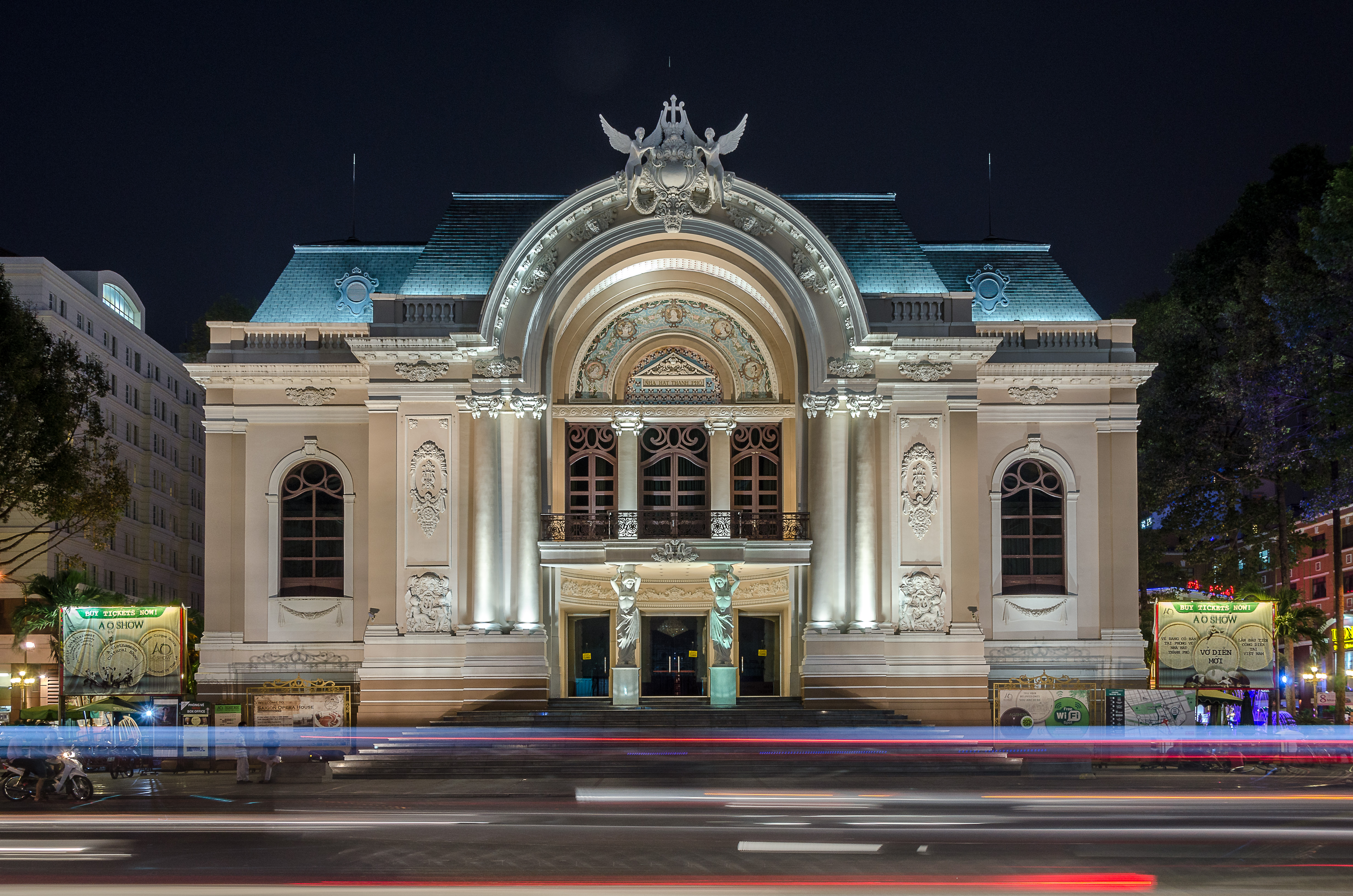
The Opera House at night (2015)

The acroterion of the Opera House

Closeup of the caryatids of the Opera House

== See also ==
- Hanoi Opera House
- Haiphong Opera House
