= Haiphong Opera House =

Opera house in Haiphong, Vietnam

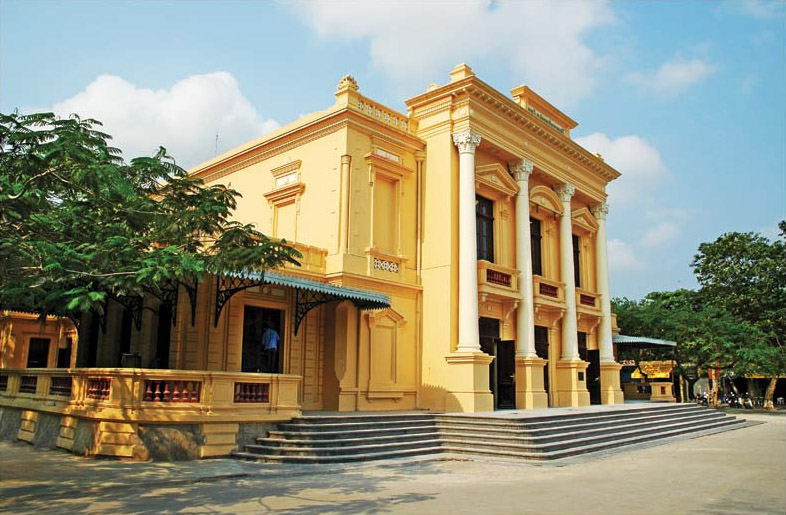
The façade of Haiphong Opera House

Haiphong Opera House (Vietnamese: Nhà hát lớn Hải Phòng) or Municipal Theatre (Vietnamese: Nhà hát Thành phố, French: Théâtre municipal de Haïphong) is a French-built neoclassical opera house on Opera Square (Quảng trường Nhà hát lớn) in Downtown Haiphong, which was opened in 1912.

== History ==
The first performance of opera in Haiphong was held by a travelling troupe in the Hotel des Colonies in 1888. Later, in 1895–1897, a touring French opera company in Indochina, featuring Alexandra David-Néel as prima donna toured Haiphong with La Traviata and Carmen. Another touring company, while waiting for the 1902 Exposition of Hanoi to open, came to Haiphong, including Blanche Arral.

The French colonial authorities cleared an old market in the square to make way for the Opera House which was in construction from 1904 to 1912. The French architect deliberately copied the designs and materials of the Palais Garnier in Paris. When it opened performances were put on by touring singers, alternating with performances at the Hanoi Opera House On August 23, 1945 the Opera House was venue for the first public meeting of the Viet Minh in Haiphong, followed by a march and occupation of key buildings not guarded by the Japanese. The Opera House was shortly afterwards scene one of the first conflicts of the First Indochina War. On 20 November 1946, during the first days of the French attack on Hai Phong, 39 Viet Minh soldiers and Opera staff with antique muskets led by platoon commander Đặng Kim Nở fought French troops from the Opera House for three days and nights, killing 50 French soldiers before they were overcome. The Viet Minh evacuated the city on the 23 November under bombardment.

Under French rule the Opera House had primarily been for the colonial population. With the departure of the French population the Opera House turned more to local genres including classical Sino-Vietnamese hát tuồng opera, classical Vietnamese hát chèo drama, and the popular cải lương folk musical, as well as Socialist theatre and musical. The Opera House also holds concerts of Vietnamese music, both classical ca trù, and neotraditional Vietnamese-Western (nhạc dân tộc cải biên, "revised national music"), folk genres such as hát chầu văn ("hát văn") and quan họ, and popular songs.
