= Lê Dung =

Vietnamese soprano opera singer (1951–2001)

NSND Lê Dung (5 June 1951 in Hòn Gai, Quảng Ninh – 29 January 2001 in Hanoi) was a Vietnamese soprano opera singer. She was a student at the Tchaikovsky Conservatory and toured and performed widely in Eastern Europe. She won prizes at Sofia, Bulgaria 1987, Toulouse 1988 and Pyongyang. She was a member of the Hanoi Opera but also sang and recorded the works of Phú Quang and other popular songwriters. In 1993, she became the youngest ever person to be accredited as People's Artist ("NSND"), Vietnam's top artistic award for a living artist - second only to the often posthumous Ho Chi Minh Prize.

== Discography ==
=== Vietnamese music ===
- 10 ca khúc Hồng Đăng, Saigon Audio, 1995
- 10 tình khúc Lê Khắc Thanh Hoài, Paris, 1995
- Âm thanh ngày mới
- Dạ khúc
- Màu nắng có bao giờ phai đâu
- Họa mi hót trong mưa
- Kỉ niệm vàng son 1
- Kỉ niệm vàng son 2
- Tiếng hát Lê Dung
- Tình nghệ sĩ
- Tiếng thời gian
- Những tình khúc thính phòng, 2001

=== Western classical ===
- O mio babbino caro from Puccini's Gianni Schicchi
- Beethoven's Ninth Symphony "Ode an die Freude", Le Dung, with Mezzo-Soprano Phuong Lan, Tenor Manh Chung and baritone Quang Tho. Hanoi Conservatory of Music and Hanoi Opera House. under the French conductor Xavier Rist. Televised performance.
