= Blanche Arral =

Belgian operatic singer

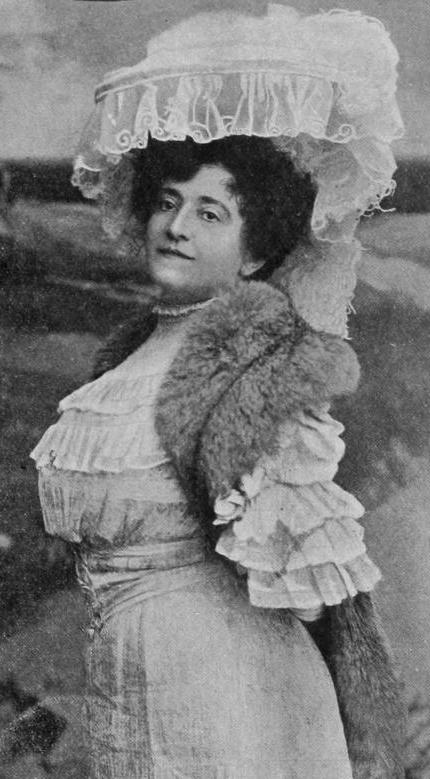
Blanche Arral, from a 1909 publication.

Blanche Arral (10 October 1864 – 3 March 1945) was a Belgian coloratura soprano.

Born Clara Lardinois in Liège, Belgium, the youngest of 17 children, she studied under Mathilde Graumann Marchesi in Paris. She debuted in a small part in the 1884 world premiere of Jules Massenet's Manon. Arral performed in various opera houses in Brussels, Paris and St. Petersburg before moving to the United States.

In 1901 she was with a touring company in Indochina, while waiting for the 1902 Exposition of Hanoi to open, performing at Haiphong and the Hanoi Opera House.

In October 1909 she debuted at Carnegie Hall. She received her voice instruction from Mathilde Graumann Marchesi. Arral was married to Hamilton Dwight Bassett, a journalist from Cincinnati. Author Jack London based the character of Lucille Arral in his short story collection Smoke Bellew on Blanche Arral.

She died in Palisades Park, New Jersey.
