= Đỗ Nhuận =

Vietnamese classical composer (1922–1991)

- Born: Đỗ Nhuận; 10 December 1922; Hải Dương, French Indochina
- Died: 18 May 1991 (aged 68); Hanoi, Vietnam
- Occupation: Composer
- Known for: Composing music
- Notable work: Đoàn lữ nhạc, Du kích Sông Thao, Giải phóng Điện Biên
- Awards: Hồ Chí Minh Prize for music

Đỗ Nhuận (December 10, 1922 in Hải Dương – May 18, 1991 in Hanoi) was a Vietnamese classical composer. He is known for the first indigenous Vietnamese opera Cô Sao. This and his other works with a revolutionary theme were premiered by the Vietnam National Opera and Ballet (VNOB) at the Grand Opera House. In 1996, he was posthumously awarded the Hồ Chí Minh Prize for music.

He is not to be confused with Đỗ Nhuận (born 1440), a Lê dynasty official and a member of Tao Đàn nhị thập bát tú, a literati society founded by Lê Thánh Tông.

== Early years ==
Unlike most Vietnamese musicians of the time who followed the romantic orientation, Nhuận entered the music industry with patriotic songs. In 1939, at the age of 17, he composed his first work Trưng Vương (Trưng sisters). In 1940 and 1941, he focused on completing the opera Nguyễn Trãi – Phi Khanh (Nguyễn Trãi and his father) and other compositions. His works appealed to the patriotism of Vietnamese people. Because of those songs and other activities assigned by the Việt Minh front, such as printing and distributing propaganda leaflets for the revolution, and mobilizing students and young people to respond to movements, he became a key cadre of the Việt Minh among Haiphong youth and students.

== Later years ==
Nhuận was the only member of the first generation of Vietnamese musicians who received extensive conservatory training; others were mostly self-taught. He studied at the Tchaikovsky Conservatory from 1960 to 1963.

During the late 1960s he was highly critical of the popular music of songwriters in the South such as Phạm Duy. Nhuận served as the General Secretary of the Vietnam Musicians' Association for two continuous terms (1957-1963, and 1963-1983).

== Works ==
Operas

- Cô Sao ("Miss Sao"), Hanoi 1965, restaged as A Sao 1976.
- Người tạc tượng ("The Sculptor"), Hanoi 1971.
- Nguyễn Trãi, Hanoi 1980.

Songs

- Du kích ca ("Guerrilla song"), 1945.
- Du kích Sông Thao ("Guerrillas of Thao River") - composed in 1949, a typical song of Nhạc đỏ.
- Hành quân xa ("Far marching"), 1954.
- Giải phóng Điện Biên ("Liberate Điện Biên") - composed on May 7, 1954, day of Điện Biên Phủ victory, was chosen as one of the official daily theme tunes of the Voice of Vietnam.
- Việt Nam - Trung Hoa ("越南—中华, Vietnam - China"), 1966.
- Hát mừng các cụ dân quân ("Congratulation to the elderly militiamen"), 1969 - song about the elderly militiamen who shot down two United States Navy planes in Operation Rolling Thunder.

== Commemoration ==
A street along the northeastern side of the Peace Park (Hanoi) in Hanoi was named after Đỗ Nhuận in 2011.
