= Hoàn Kiếm district =

Coordinates: 21°01′44″N 105°51′09″E

Hoàn Kiếm district Quận Hoàn Kiếm
- Urban district (quận)
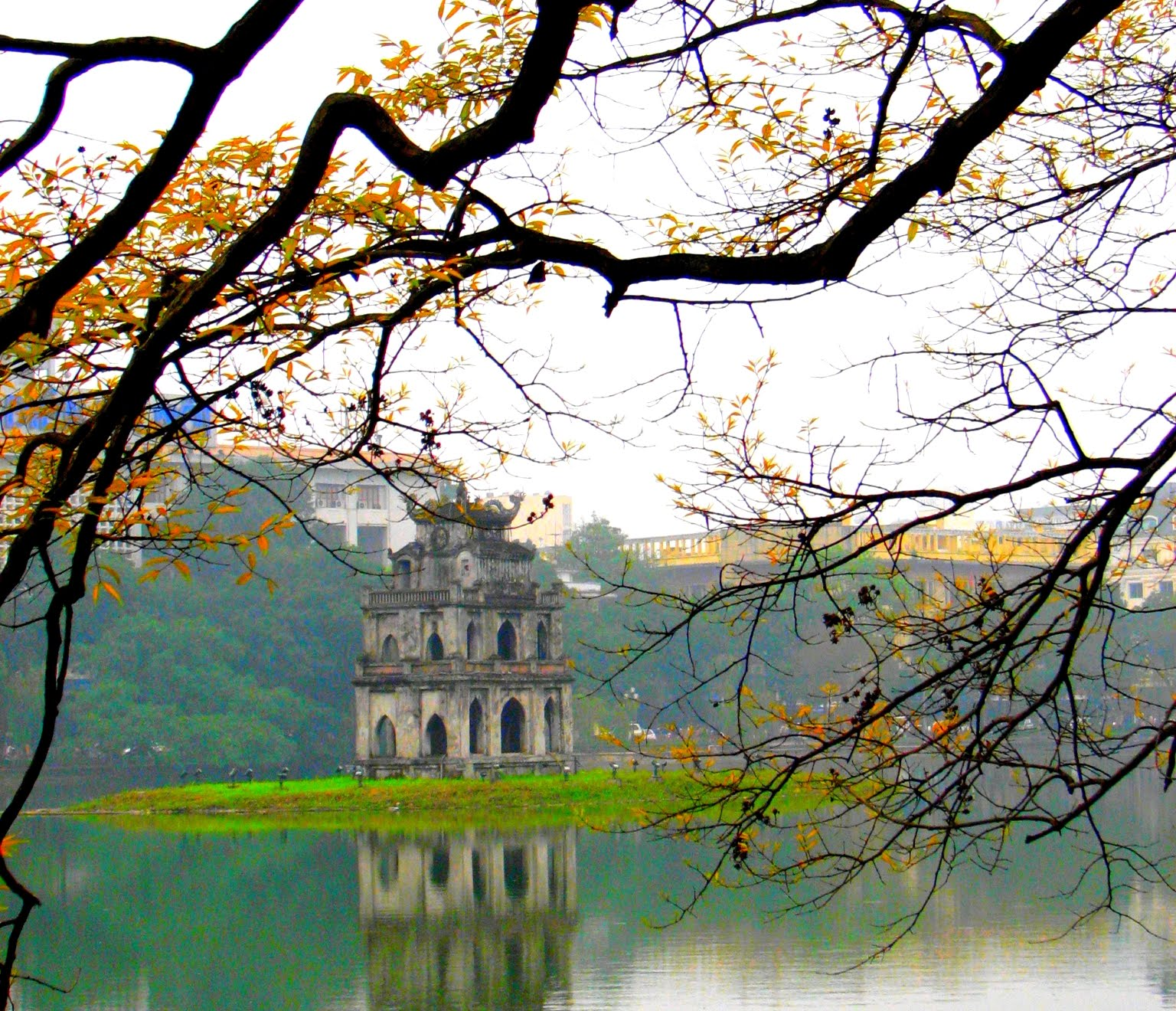
- Tháp Rùa (Turtle Tower) in Hoàn Kiếm Lake

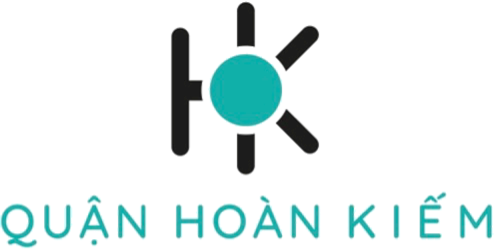
- Seal
- Interactive map of Hoàn Kiếm district
- Country: Vietnam
- City: Hanoi
- Seat: Hàng Trống ward
- Wards: 18 wards

Area
  - Total: 5.29 km^{2} (2.04 sq mi)

Population (2019)
  - Total: 135,618
  - Density: 25,600/km^{2} (66,400/sq mi)
- Time zone: UTC+7 (ICT)
- Area code: 24
- Climate: Cwa
- Website: Official website (in Vietnamese)

Hoàn Kiếm (transl. Returned Sword) is one of the four original urban districts (quận) of Hanoi, the capital city of Vietnam. It is named after the scenic Hoàn Kiếm Lake. The lake is in the heart of the district and serves as the focal point of the city's public life. The majority of tourist attractions in Hanoi are also located in the district.

The district currently has 18 wards (phường), covering a total area of 5.29 square kilometres (2.04 sq mi). As of 2019, there were 135,618 people residing in the district

Hoàn Kiếm is the downtown and commercial center of Hanoi. Most of the largest Vietnamese public corporations and bank headquarters are located here, but the central government offices are located in Ba Đình district. The Hanoi Metropolitan People's Committee is located on Đinh Tiên Hoàng street, adjacent to the Hoàn Kiếm lake.

The district has a north–south division among its wards. Its northern half houses the Old Quarter with small street blocks and alleys, and a traditional Vietnamese atmosphere. The southern half has distinctive French-style villas and broad avenues, and is sometimes called the "French Quarter" in modern travel literature. Some notable buildings in Hoàn Kiếm's "French Quarter" are the Hanoi Opera House, the Sofitel Legend Metropole Hanoi hotel, the National Museum of Vietnamese History (formerly the École française d'Extrême-Orient), the Grand Palais, and the Tonkin Palace.

== History ==
The district has been witness to the long history of Hanoi.

In the early Lý dynasty, in 545, the emperor Lý Nam Đế settled his encampment, and built a wooden raft on the Tô Lịch River to defend against invasion of the Liang dynasty.

During the Nguyễn dynasty, Emperor Minh Mạng established the province of Hanoi in Hoàn Kiếm in 1831.

In 1920, this district was home to the country's first business school.

Between 1954 and 1961, the current district covered all of Hoàn Kiếm ward, Đồng Xuân ward and a part of Hàng Co ward and Hàng Bài ward. In 1961, the entire area was combined into Hoàn Kiếm ward. In January 1981 the ward was upgraded into Hoàn Kiếm district, including 18 wards that have remained since.

== Cityscape ==
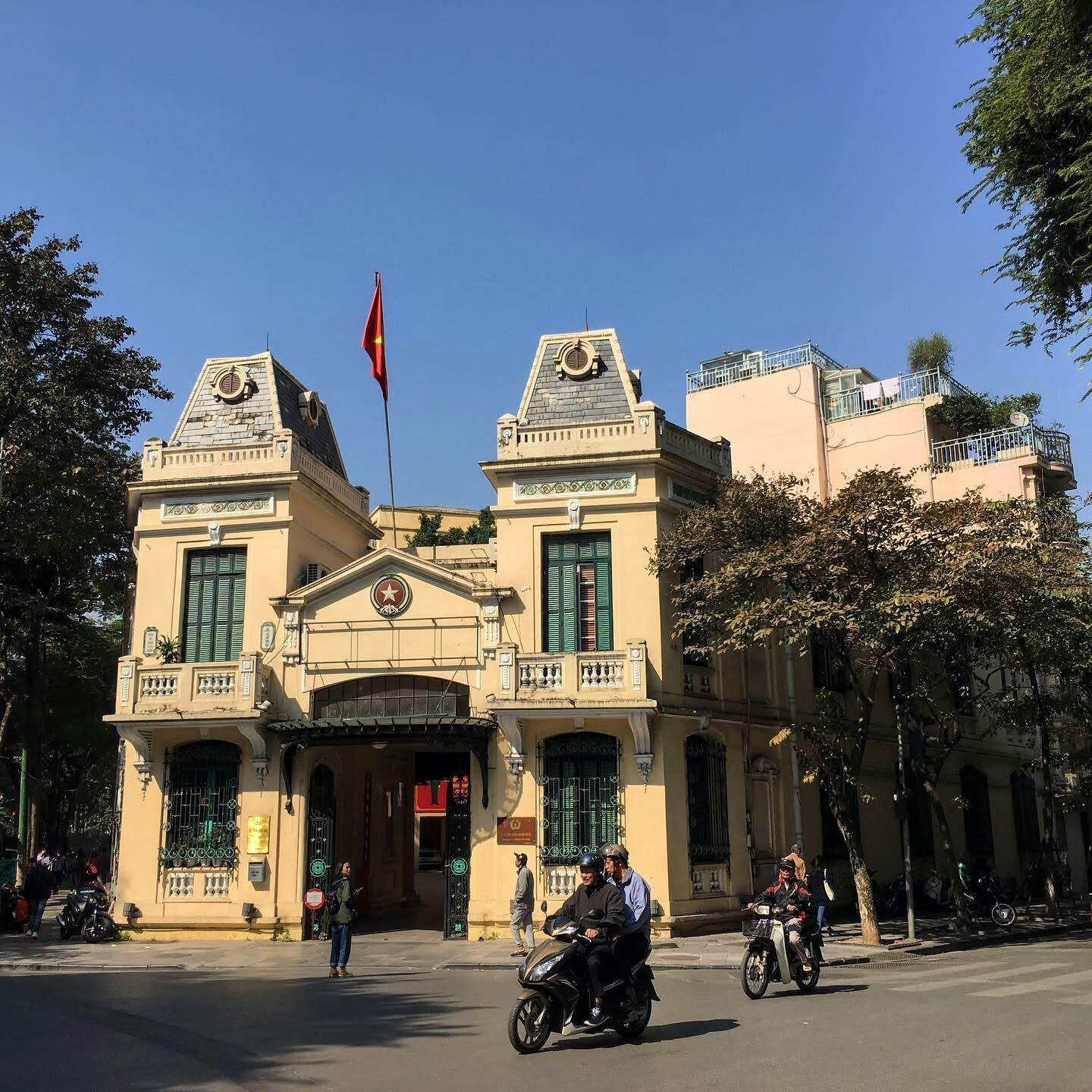
A local police station in a French Colonial building on Lê Thái Tổ street

The district has a distinctive north–south division among its wards. Its northern-half houses the Old Quarter with small street blocks and alleys, and a traditional Vietnamese atmosphere. Many streets in the Old Quarter have names signifying the goods ("hàng") the local merchants were or are specialized in. For example, "Hàng Bạc" (silver stores) still have many stores specializing in trading silver and jewelries.

Hoàn Kiếm's southern-half has distinctive French-style villas and broad avenues, and is sometimes called the "French Quarter" in modern travel literature. Some notable buildings in Hoàn Kiếm's "French Quarter" are the Hanoi Opera House, the Sofitel Legend Metropole Hanoi hotel, the National Museum of Vietnamese History (formerly the École française d'Extrême-Orient), and the Tonkin Palace. Many of the French-styled buildings in the south of the districts are now used as foreign embassies and government offices. Ba Đình district is also called the "French Quarter" because of the high concentration of French architecture.

== Wards ==
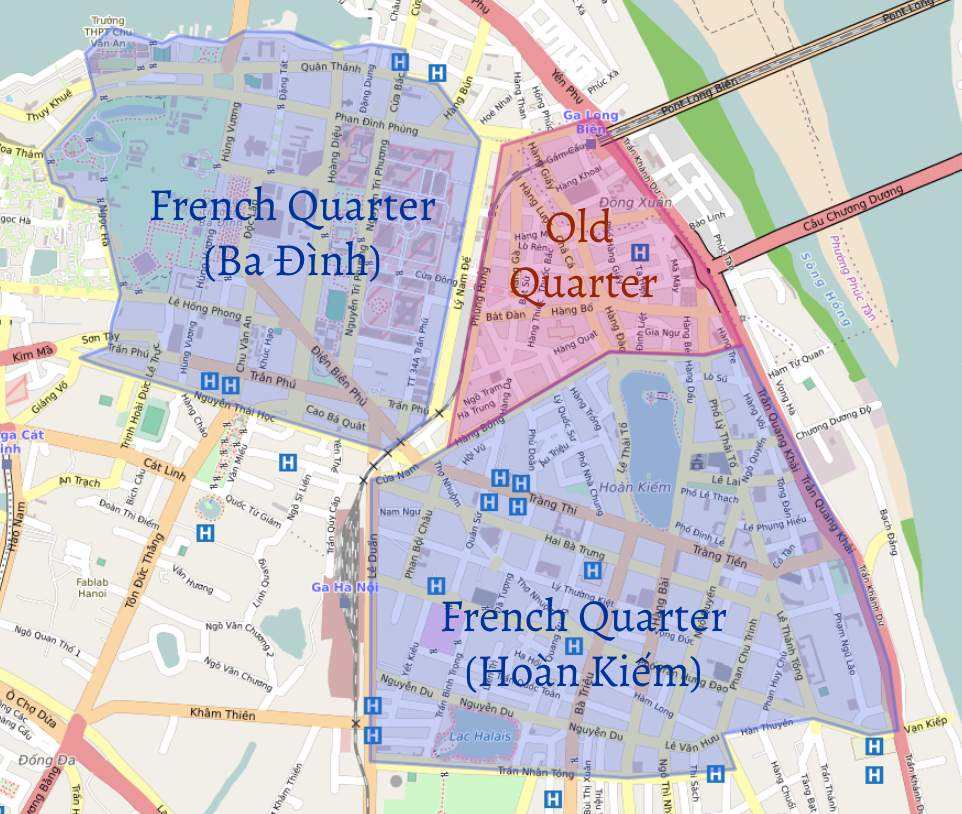
Approximation of Hanoi's Old Quarter and French Quarters

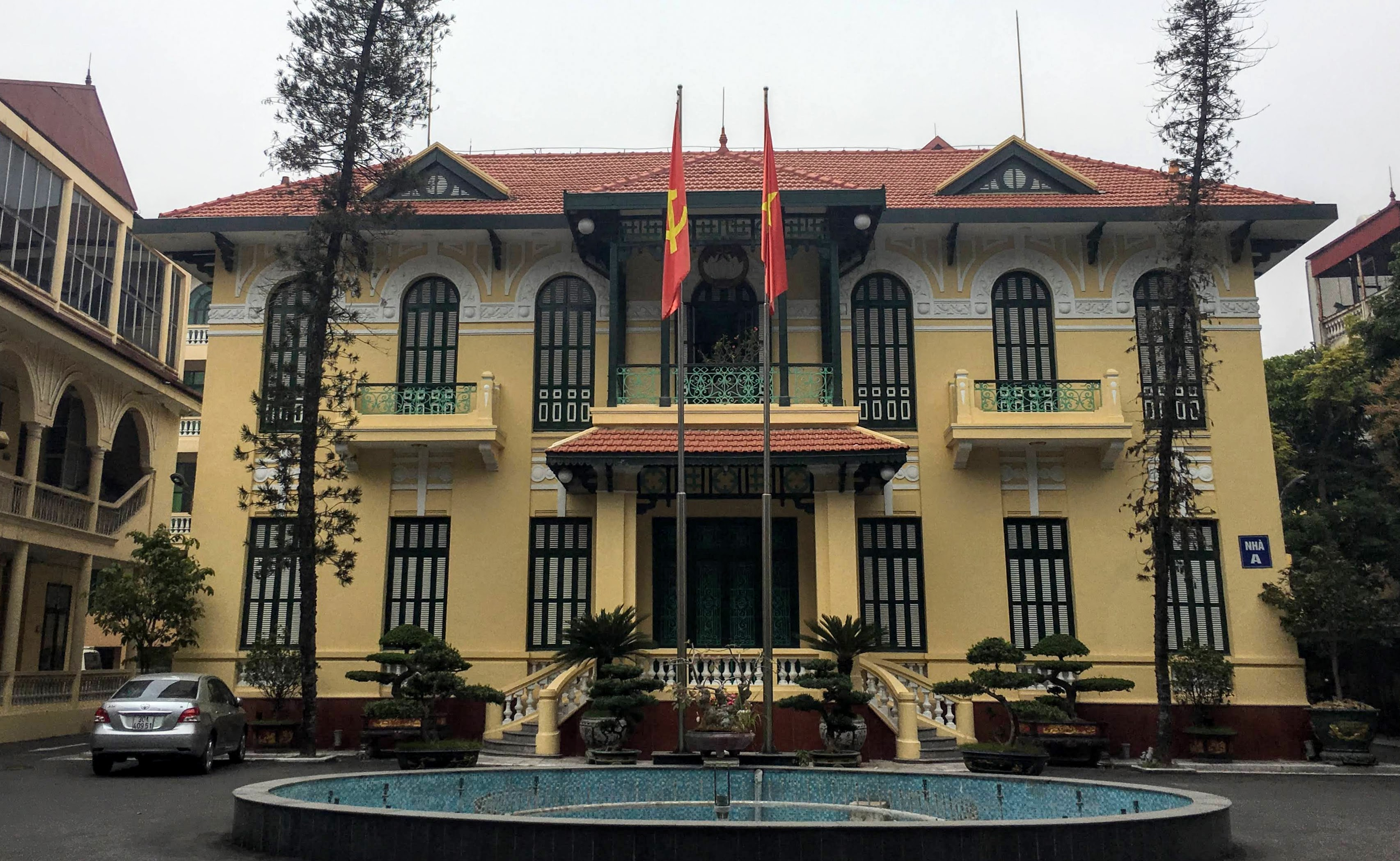
A French Colonial building on Tràng Thi street (Fatherland Front HQ)

- "Old Quarter" area
  - Cửa Đông (Eastern Gate)
  - Đồng Xuân (Springfield)
  - Hàng Bạc
  - Hàng Bồ
  - Hàng Bông (partially also in the French Quarter)
  - Hàng Buồm
  - Hàng Đào
  - Hàng Gai
  - Hàng Mã
- "French Quarter" area
  - Cửa Nam (Southern Gate)
  - Hàng Bài
  - Hàng Trống
  - Lý Thái Tổ
  - Phan Chu Trinh
  - Trần Hưng Đạo
  - Tràng Tiền (Mint)
- Beyond the Red River dike area
  - Chương Dương
  - Phúc Tân

== Tourist destinations ==
Many of Hanoi's tourist attractions are located in Hoàn Kiếm, including the Old Quarter, the Hanoi Opera House, the St. Joseph's Cathedral, the National Museum of Vietnamese History, and the Thăng Long Water Puppet Theatre.

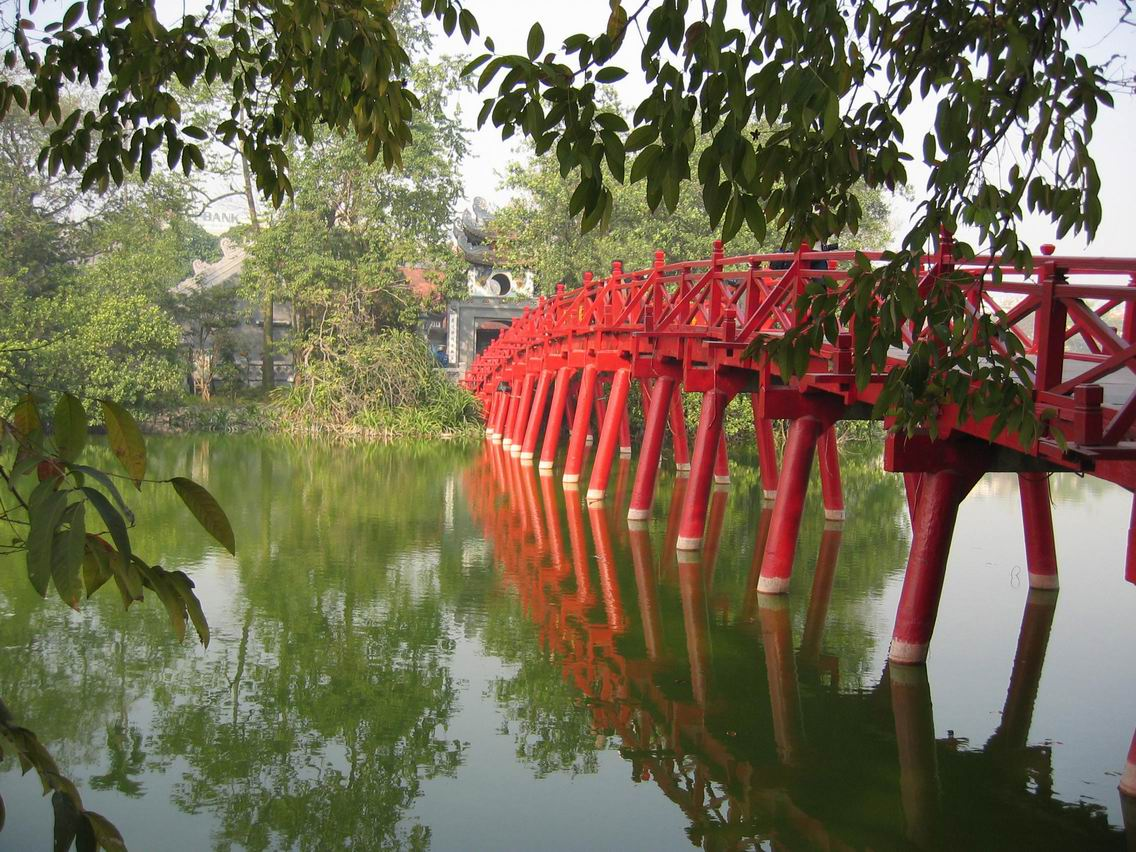
Thê Húc Bridge on Hoàn Kiếm Lake

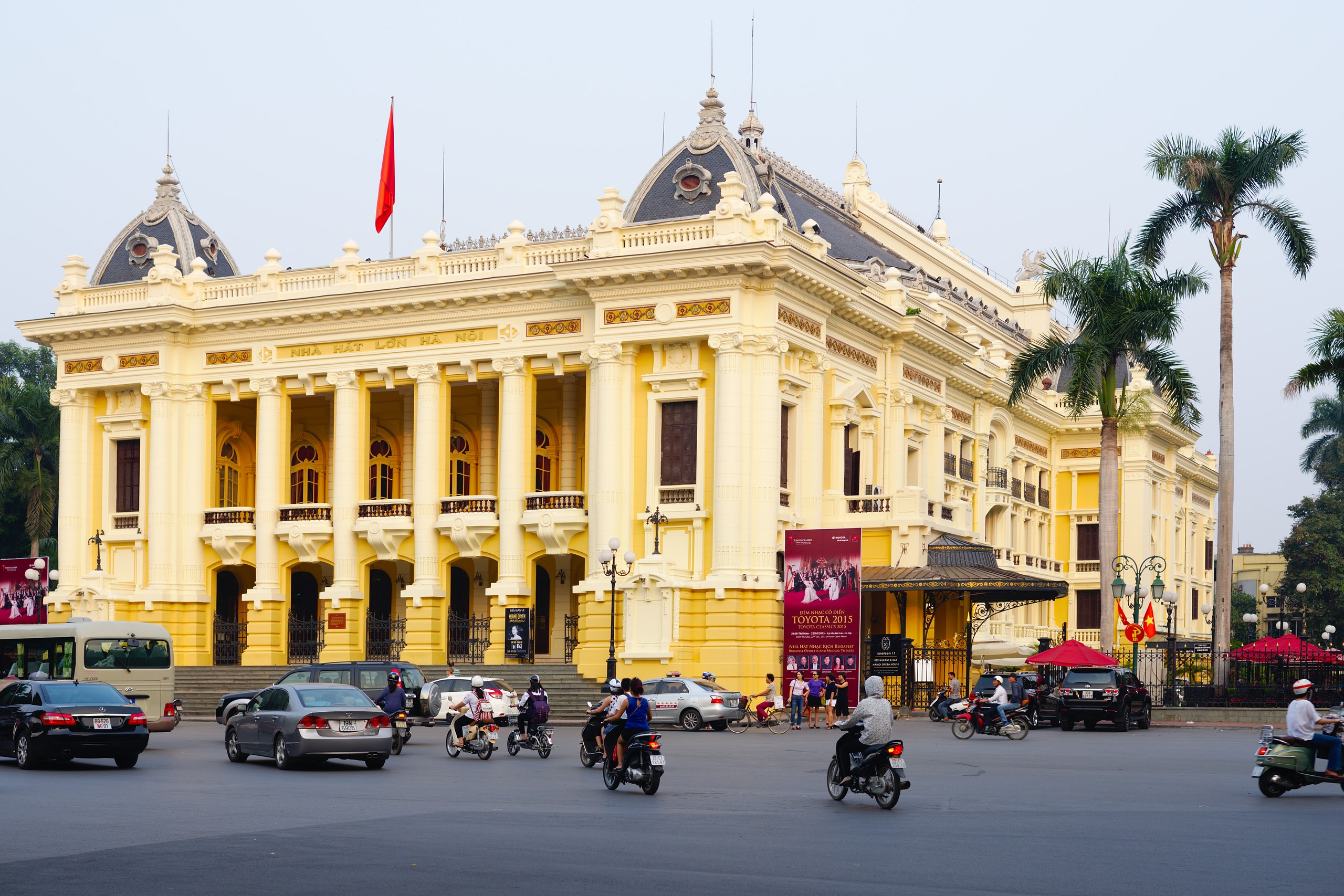
Hanoi Opera House modeled on the Palais Garnier in Paris

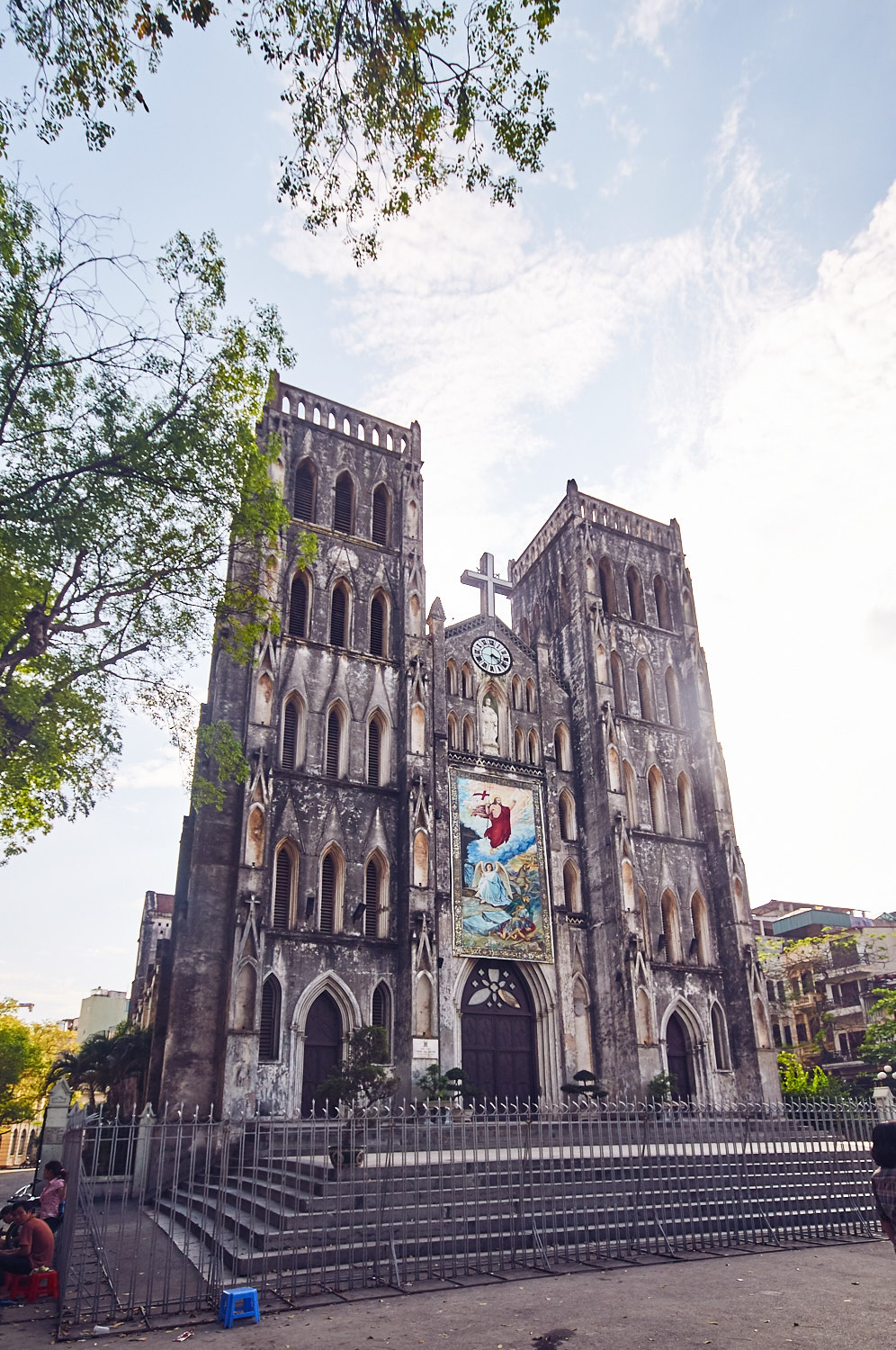
St. Joseph's Cathedral, Hanoi resembling Notre Dame de Paris

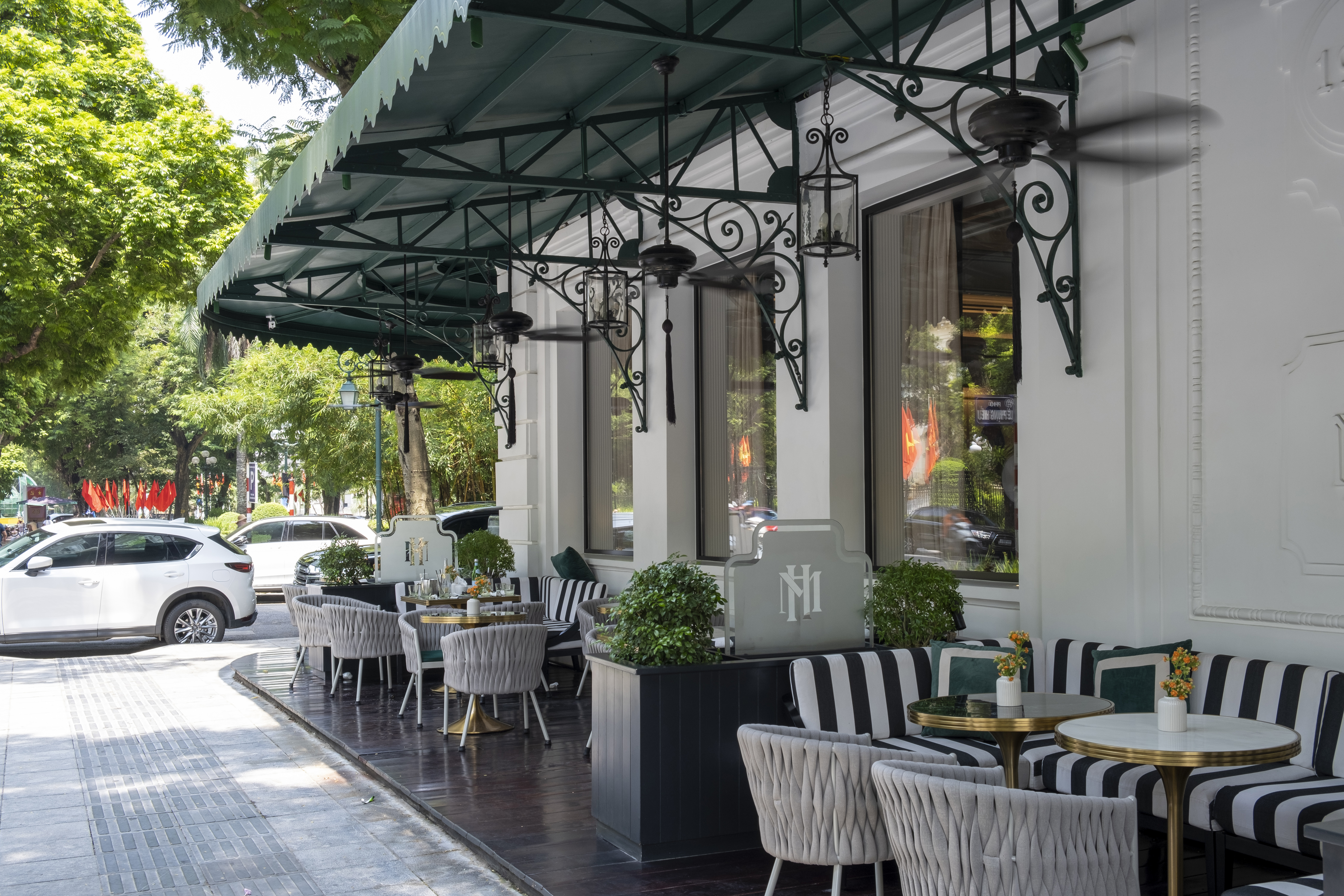
A corner of Hôtel Metropole

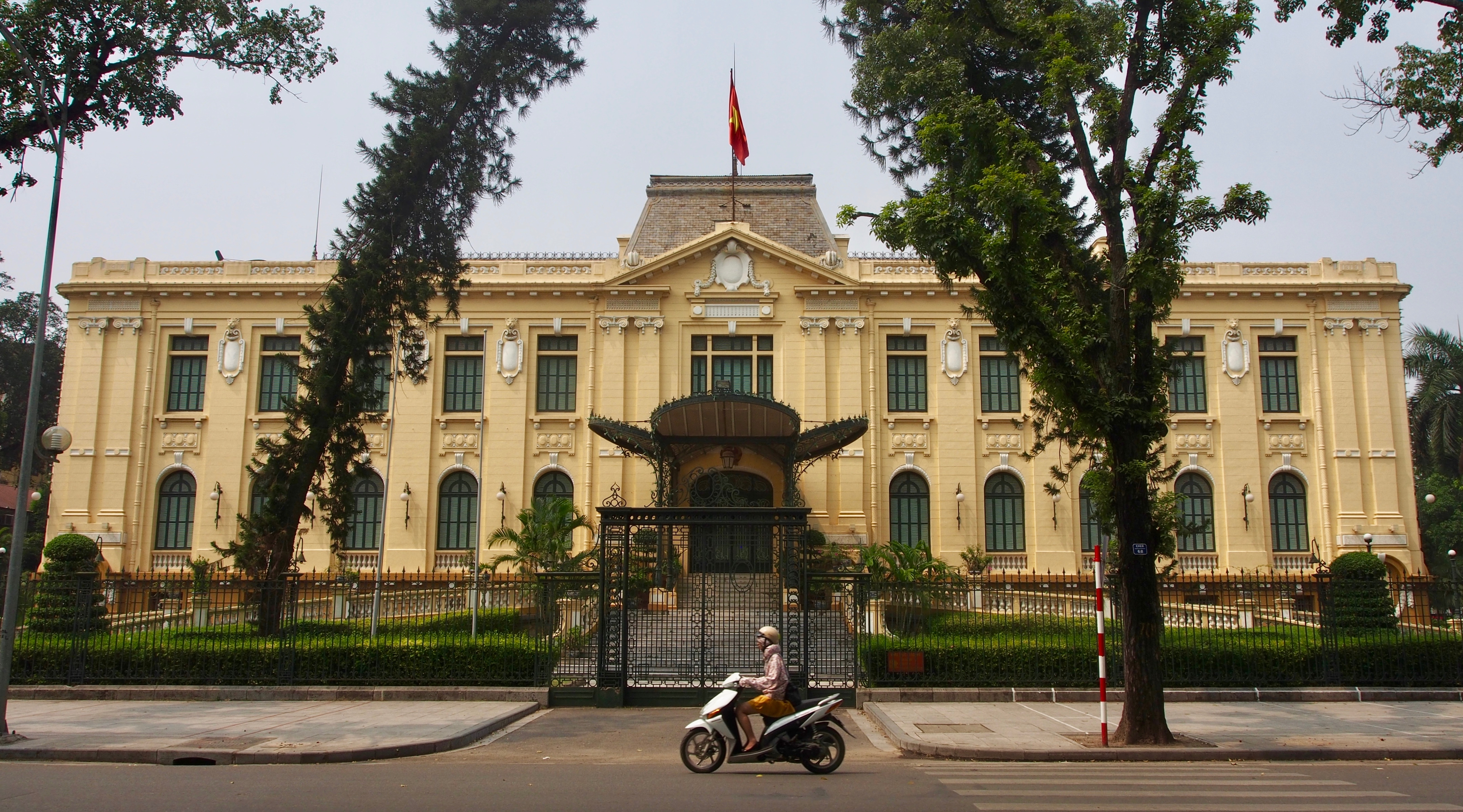
Tonkin Palace, formerly housing the French governor of Tonkin

Museum of Vietnamese History, formerly the first École française d'Extrême-Orient

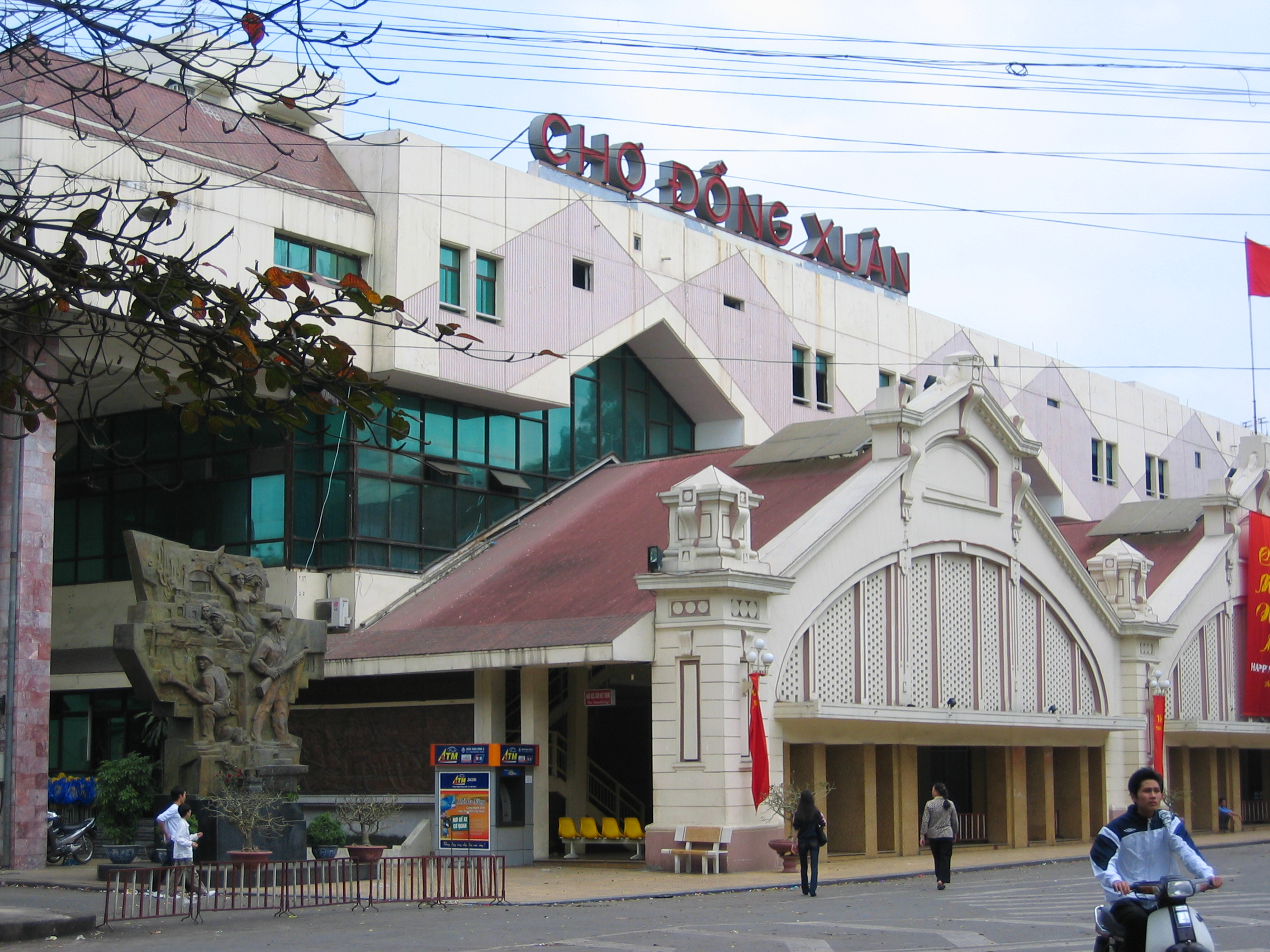
Đồng Xuân Market

Grand Palais built for the Hanoi Exhibition, destroyed during WWII

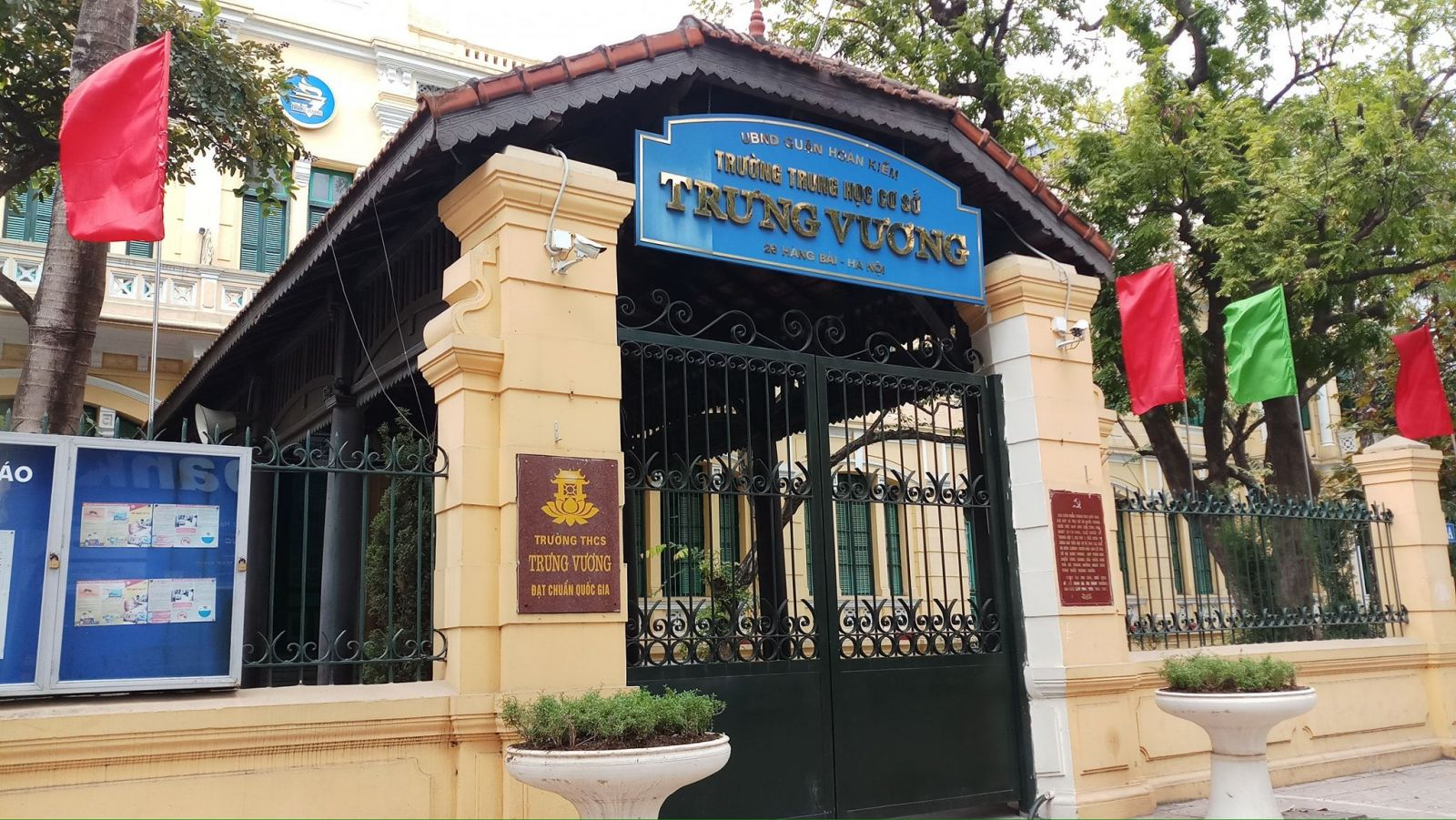
Trưng Vương Lower Secondary School, where the last physical depiction of Hanoi's seal from French colonial times remains.
