= Nguyen Thien Dao =

Vietnamese-French composer

Nguyễn Thiên Đạo (3 July 1940 – 20 November 2015) was a Vietnamese-French composer who worked in contemporary classical music. He was born in Hanoi, French Indochina, and came to France in 1953, where he studied composition with Olivier Messiaen. He lived in Paris, France. In 1974 he received the Prix Olivier Messiaen for composition awarded by the Fondation Erasmus in the Netherlands and the Prix André Caplet (Académie des Beaux-Arts) in 1984. He died in Paris on 20 November 2015 at the age of 75.

== Works ==
- Tuyen Lua for chamber ensemble, Festival de Royan 1969.
- Koskom for large orchestra, Radio France 1971
- Ba Me Vietnam, for contrabass and twenty instruments, Festival de La Rochelle, 1972
- Mỵ Châu Trọng Thuỷ Opera in Vietnamese - premiere at the Opéra de Paris (Salle Favart), 1979.
- Concerto pour piano et orchestre, Rencontres de Metz, 1984
- Tim lua puor piano, 1984
- Symphonie pour pouvoir with Orchestre National de France at the Théâtre des Champs Elysées, 1989
- Concerto 1789 (pour sextuor à cordes et orchestre), with the Orchestre National de Lille at the Palais des Congrès of Lille.
- Les enfants d’Izieu opéra-oratorio Festival d’Avignon 1994
- Hoa Tâu Hanoi Opera 1995
- Khai Nhac Hanoi Opera 1997
- Giao-Hoa Sinfonia, Salle Olivier Messiaen Radio France 1998
- Sóng hồn ("Married") opera. Premiere Hanoi Opera House in Vietnam. 2000
- Arco Vivo for violoncello solo 2000
- Kosmofonia pour grand orchestre et chœur Forbach 2001
- Sóng nhất nguyên (Monastic Wave) 2002
- Sóng nhạc Trương Chi (The Wave of Music) Opéra de Hanoî 2003
- Quatre Lyriques de ciel et de terre, opéra de chambre Paris 2004
- Suoi Lung May, 1er Festival de Musique International Hué 2006.
- Khoi Thap, Hanoi Opera 2007
- So Day, Hanoi Opera 2007
- Duo Vivo, hommage à Olivier Messiaen, Théâtre des Bouffes du Nord 2008,
- Định mệnh bất chợt Oratorio – "Thanh xướng kịch KIỀU của Nguyễn Thiện Đạo" 2012

== Discography ==
- Nguyễn Thiệ̣n Đạo Bat Khuat Marius Constant Equal Jacques Delécluse Quintuple Les Percussions de l'Orchestre de Paris EMI France LP 1971
- Nguyễn Thiệ̣n Đạo Phu Dông. Gio Dông. Bà Me Viêt-nam. Erato France LP 1979
