= Cô Sao =

Opera composed by Đỗ Nhuận

Cô Sao ("Miss Sao") is a 1965 Vietnamese-language western-style opera by the composer Đỗ Nhuận. It is usually regarded as the first opera in Vietnamese.
