= Grand Palais (Hanoi) =

Vietnamese historic building complex

Grand Palais de l'Exposition
- Nhà Đấu xảo (Vietnamese)
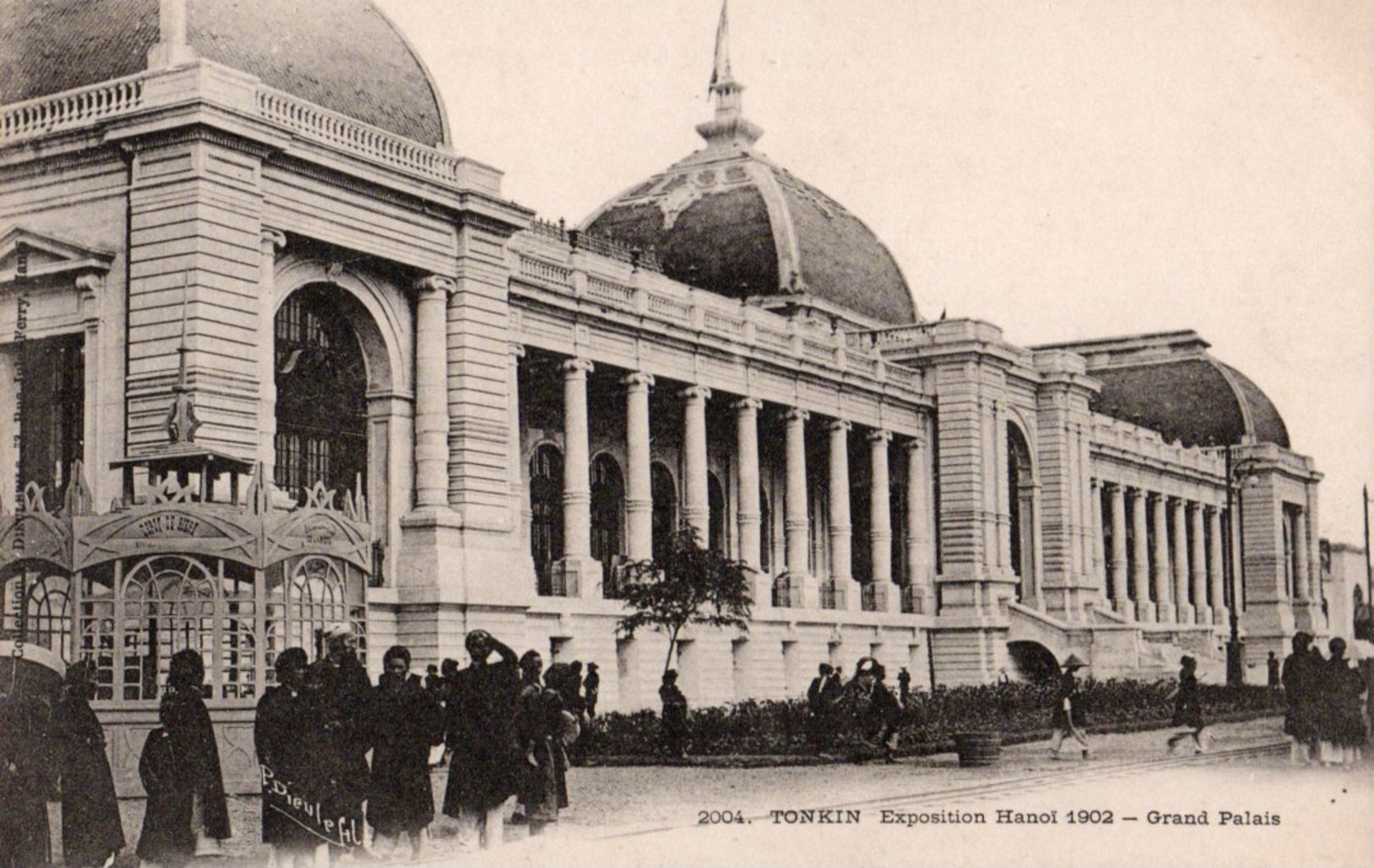

- Location within Vietnam
- 21.02256°N 105.84418°E
- Location: Hoàn Kiếm District, Hanoi, Vietnam

History
- Built for: Hanoi Exhibition

Site notes
- Area: 41 acres (17 ha)
- Architect: Adolphe Bussy
- Architectural styles: French Colonial, Neoclassical

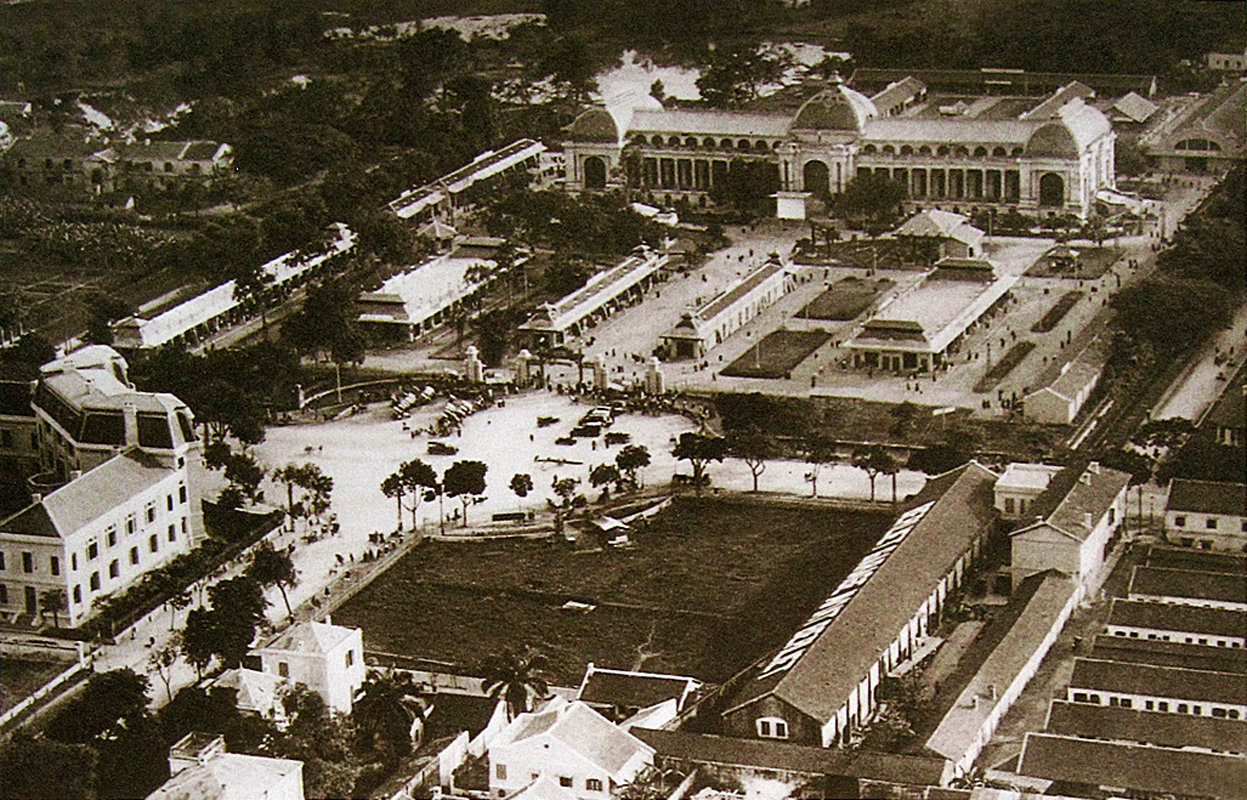
Aerial view of the entire complex

The Grand Palais or Grand Palais de l'Exposition (Vietnamese: Nhà Đấu xảo) was an exhibition and trade fair complex in Hanoi, Vietnam. It was built for the 1902 Hanoi Exhibition world trade fair, as the city became the capital of French Indochina. It was completely destroyed by American airstrikes in World War II.

== History ==
Hanoi became the capital of French Indochina in 1902 replacing Saigon. Earlier activities to mark the change included a festival on 26 February 1902 attended by emperor Thành Thái and the governor general Paul Doumer and the opening of the Paul Doumer Bridge (now Long Biên Bridge). Paul Doumer also wanted to host a large-scaled world expo in Hanoi. The building was designed by Adolphe Bussy and was completed in 1902 prior to the fair, which lasted between November 1902 and February 1903. The high construction cost of the exhibition palace and the long duration of the fair left Hanoi's budget in deficit for a decade.

After the fair, the complex became the Maurice Long Museum, the first and largest economics museum in French Indochina. It was named after the 1920s' Governor-General of Indochina.

When the Japanese took over Vietnam, they based their military and supply in the palace. Later, American air raids at the end of World War II completely destroyed the building. The only remnants of the palace are two big bronze lion statues, which are now placed in front of the Vietnam Central Circus building in the Reunification Park in Hai Bà Trưng District.

The modern site of the palace now stands the Friendship Cultural Palace (Vietnamese: Cung Văn hoá Hữu nghị), a concert venue in southern Hoàn Kiếm District. The concert hall was built by the Soviets.

== Location ==
The site of the Grand Palais was on Boulevard Gambetta in the French Quarter south of Hoàn Kiếm lake near the Central Station. The modern site is on Trần Hưng Đạo street in Hoàn Kiếm District, a major avenue hosting several foreign embassies, state ministries and corporate headquarters. The French Embassy is located three blocks away from the site, on the same avenue.
