= Hanoi Exhibition =

1902 world's fair in French Indochina

1902–1903 Hanoi
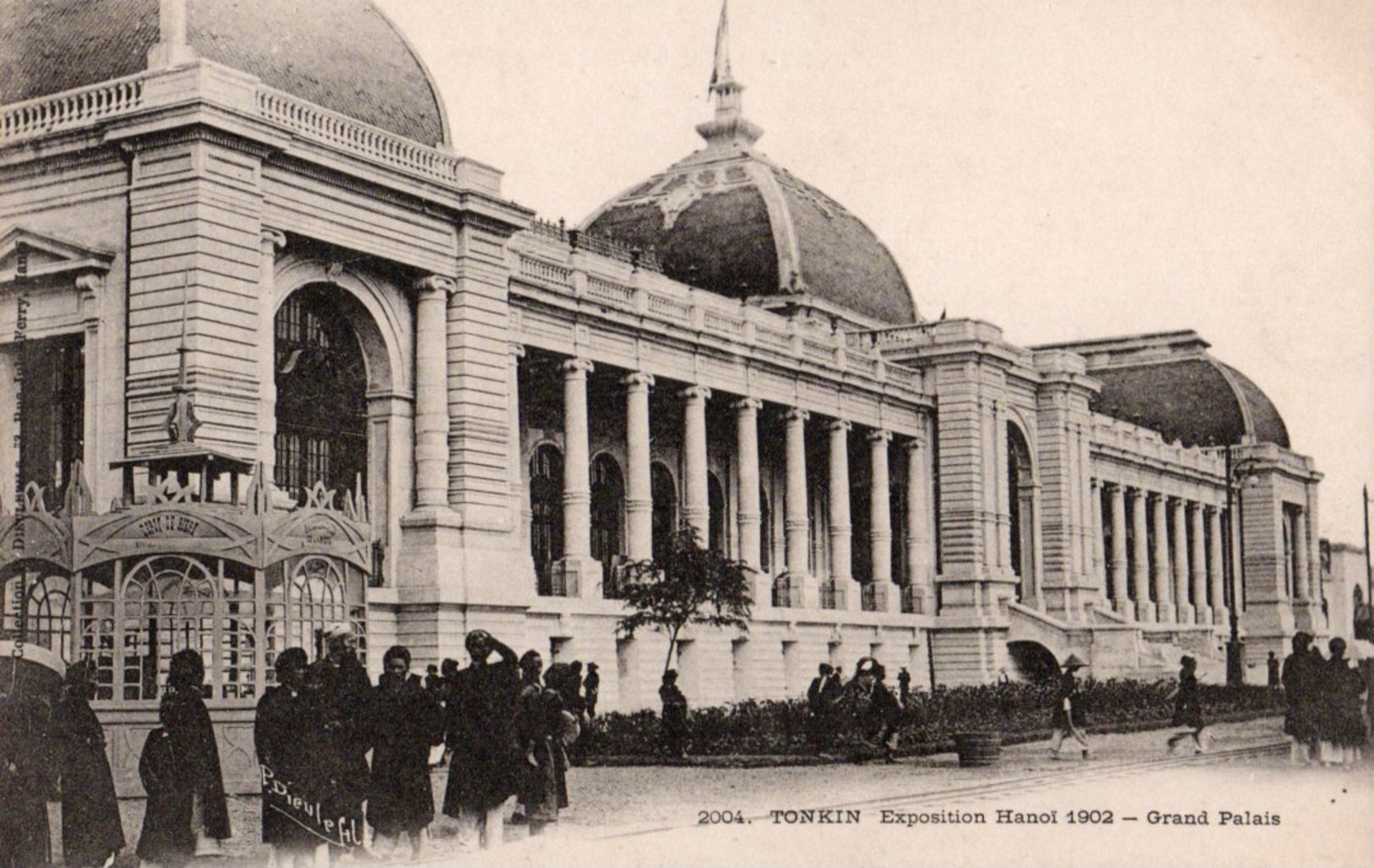
- Grand Palais d'Expositions

Overview
- BIE-class: Unrecognized exposition
- Name: Indo China Exposition Française et Internationale
- Building(s): Palais d'expositions designed by Adolphe Bussy
- Area: 41 acres (17 hectares)
- Organized by: Paul Doumer

Location
- Country: Tonkin (now Northern Vietnam)
- City: Hanoi
- Coordinates: 21.0393206°N 105.8343995°E

Timeline
- Opening: 15 November 1902
- Closure: 15 or 16 February 1903

The Hanoi Exhibition (Exposition de Hanoi) was a world's fair held in Hanoi in then French Indochina between November 16, 1902, and February 15 or 16, 1903.

== Context ==
Hanoi had become the capital of French Indochina earlier in 1902 replacing Saigon. Earlier activities to mark the change included a festival on 26 February 1902 attended by emperor Thành Thái and the governor general Paul Doumer and the opening of the Paul Doumer (now Long Biên) Bridge. The exhibition was the idea of Paul Doumer.

== Grand Palais de l'Exposition ==
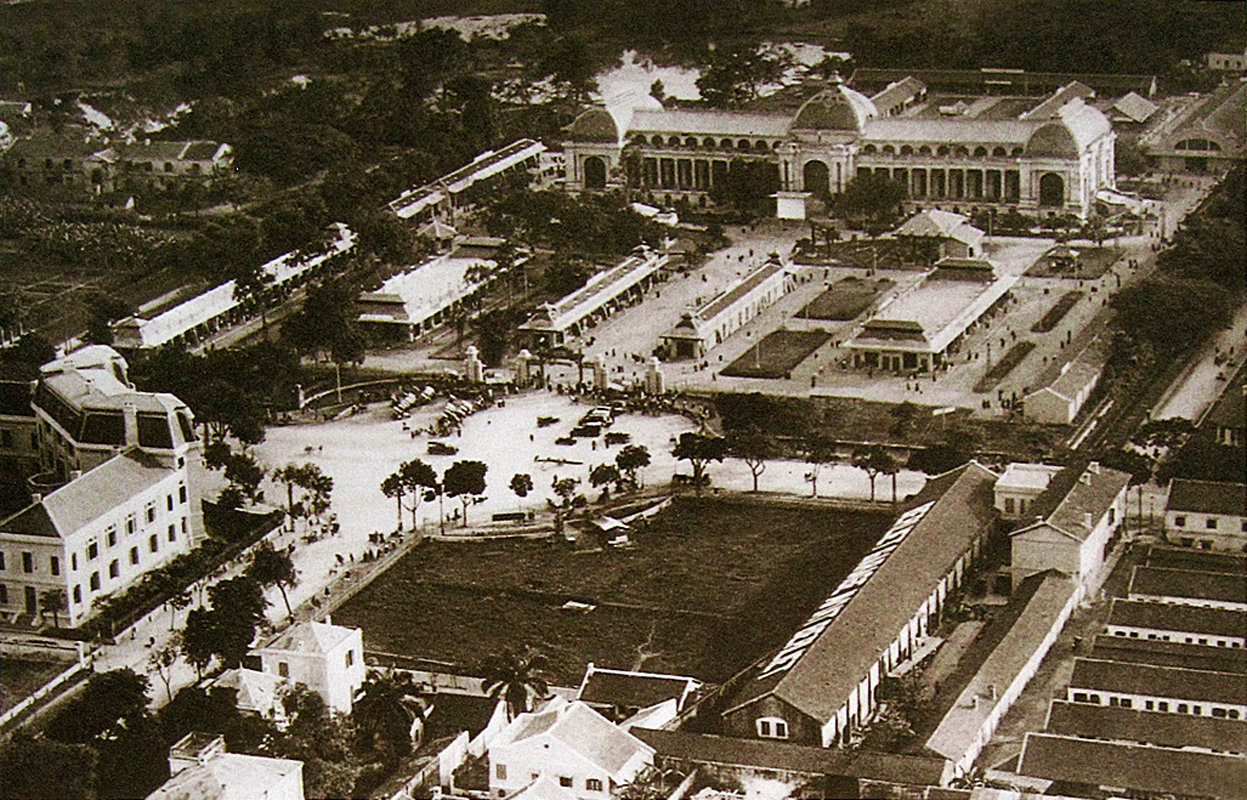
Aerial view of the fair site

The site of the fair was the racecourse established in the early 1890s, and its main building was the Grand Palais de l'Exposition (Vietnamese: Nhà Đấu xảo) designed by Adolphe Bussy.

The preparation for the fair, especially the construction of the exhibition palace, left Hanoi's budget in deficit for a decade.

When the Japanese took over Vietnam, they based their military and supply in the palace. Later, air raids at the end of World War II completely destroyed the building.

The modern site of the palace now stands the Friendship Cultural Palace (Vietnamese: Cung Văn hoá Hữu nghị), a concert venue in southern Hoàn Kiếm District.

== Participation ==
The fair showed products from France and her colonies, and from other territories in Southeast Asia:, Burma, Ceylon, China, Dutch Indies, Formosa (now Taiwan), French Indo-China, India, Japan, Korea, Malaysia, Malacca, the Philippines, Siam and Singapore.

== Exhibits ==
As well as country displays there was a machine gallery, a La Grand Roue amusement ride, and art in the French Section of Fine Arts including work by Carolus-Duran.
