= Theatre of Vietnam =

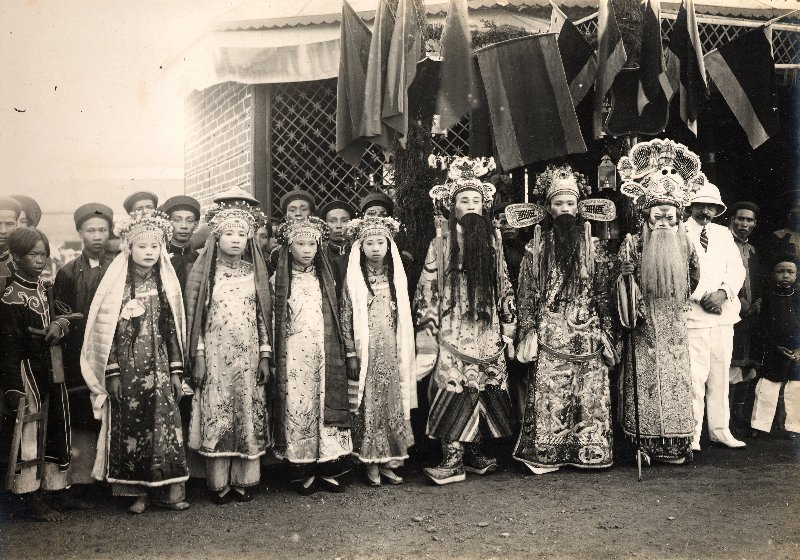
1920s Tuồng theatre actors

Theatre of Vietnam comprises many traditional forms of drama which survive and retain their popularity to varying degrees. It formed during the Đinh dynasty, when the Đại Cồ Việt state was born. Water puppetry is a distinctively Vietnamese art form which arose in the 12th century in which a split-bamboo screen obscures puppeteers, who stand in water manipulating the puppets in front of the screen using long poles. Water puppetry is currently popular with tourists to Vietnam. With the success of the August Revolution in 1945, theatrical art entered a new creative period including a new type of theatre based on the music of local folk tunes.

== History ==
Vietnam's theatre industry was formed during the Đinh dynasty, when the Đại Cồ Việt state was born after 1000 years of Northern domination. Hoa Lư is the first capital of Vietnam's centralized feudal state, and is the origin of many cultural values with Vietnamese identity. This is the birthplace of written literature and is also considered the ancestral land of Vietnamese theatre art with the formation of chèo, tuồng and circus disciplines. Hoa Lư is the homeland of the cheo theatre art founded by Mrs. Phạm Thị Trân, a talented dancer in the Đinh royal palace. This is the earliest and most typical type of theatre in Vietnam. Through the legend of the shaman Văn Du Tường of the Đinh dynasty, using a scheme to kill the Xương Cuồng demon in Bạch Hạc, shows that the art of circus and vaudeville such as walking on a rope, swinging, and planting banana trees has appeared. Also in the Đinh dynasty, Emperss Dương Thị Nguyệt was considered as the ancestor who taught the Xuân Phả game to the people to perform in the annual festival in Xuân Phả, Thọ Xuân, Thanh Hóa. Đại Việt sử ký toàn thư recorded: Autumn Ất Dậu, on the anniversary of the coronation, emperor Lê Đại Hành organized a boating light festival, taking bamboo as a fake mountain, called Nam Sơn. To frighten the Song emissaries, the king gave three thousand soldiers who liked the three words "Thiên Tử Quân" majestically and majestically on their foreheads, opened a great exercise, played a fake role with the boatmen, and rang the drums and cheered, planting flags, pretending to arrange troops in battle, to flaunt their prestige and still citing the above book: Emperor Lê Đại Hành reigned to conquer Champa, captured hundreds of singers in the Champa capital and brought them back to the country, forcing them to dance, sing and have fun, that was the formation of theatre and circus art. The historical legends of tuồng singing also record that this type of day was formed in the Early Lê dynasty in 1005, when a Chinese singer named Liêu Thủ Tâm came to Hoa Lư and presented the popular singing style in the Song dynasty and was accepted by the Emperor. Lê Long Đĩnh recruited and appointed the ward chief to teach the palace maidens to singing in the palace.

During the war against the Yuan dynasty, the Trần dynasty captured the Southern Song musician Lý Nguyên Cát, who was the head of the theatre department in the Yuan dynasty army. Lý Nguyên Cát adapted Vietnamese language to compose plays and train Vietnamese people to perform. During the reign of Trần Dụ Tông, a friend named Đinh Bàng Đức from the Yuan dynasty came to take refuge because of the war. Đinh Bàng Đức taught the Vietnamese people how to sing with a stick. Dancing was regularly held in the court and in folklore. In addition to chèo, traditional hát ả đào was quite popular among the folk and the nobility. Trần nobles loved chèo singing and clowning. During the reign of Trần Dụ Tông, the nobles in the court were passionate about art, many royal chèo plays were staged and performed by the royal people themselves, and the king himself reviewed and rewarded the performers and performers. Good singing in the Trần court was described by the Yuan dynasty porcelain Trần Cương Trung in the work "Successful Intersection", whereby each time a banquet in the palace often had music and dancing, the songs were similar to those of Giáng Châu Long, Enter the imperial capital of the North, the tone is old but shorter.

But from the 15th century, the Lê dynasty made theatrical art a leisure activity for small people (uneducated working people), banned from performing at the palace, and issued many harsh documents restricting This art developed in folk. Because of that situation, theatre art still exists in the countryside but does not thrive.

With the success of the August Revolution, theatrical art entered a new creative period. Artists from all over the world are gathered. Literary groups were established. a series of theatrical plays were born in war zones serving the resistance. In the years of peace, the theatre flourished, from a semi-professional theatrical movement, the campfire stage developed into professional art troupes. Entering the resistance war against the US, the mighty theatre army went to battle with many fierce battles with the slogan "Tiếng hát át tiếng bom". Many theatrical productions born in this period with epic stature, praising feats, praising heroes, female martyrs, condemning the enemy, cheering the war are plays present in many battles. It leaves a deep impression on the viewers. After 1975, along with the convergence of the whole nation, the stage was on the roof of the Vietnam Association of theatre Artists. The highlight of the theatre from 1975 to 1990, apart from epic works written about the war, was a series of plays with contemporary social themes.

== Notable traditional genres ==
=== Traditional musical theatre ===
==== Chèo ====
Chèo is a form of generally satirical musical theatre, often encompassing dance, traditionally performed by Vietnamese peasants in northern Vietnam. It is usually performed outdoors by semi-amateur touring groups, stereotypically in a village square or the courtyard of a public building, although it is today increasingly also performed indoors and by professional performers. Chèo stage art is one of the great cultural heritage of the Vietnamese folk treasure. Chèo has been a popular art form of the Vietnamese people for many generations and has fostered the national spirit through its lyrical content. Hoa Lu–Ninh Binh is considered as the original land of the Chèo, and its founder, (Mrs) Pham Thi Tran, was a talented dancer in the royal palace during the Dinh dynasty of the tenth century. However, Chèo officially appears from the Ly dynasty (around the 11th century), flourished in the Tran dynasty (13th century). The development of Chèo has its milestone when a Mongolian military soldier was captured in Vietnam in the 14th century. Chèo's performance only included speak and recite folk songs prior to this period but influenced by the art of the soldier as an actor in his country, Chèo now also has the parts of singing. In the 15th century, Emperor Le Thanh Tong did not allow Chèo to be shown in the royal court, from when Chèo came back to the peasants as a usual musical entertainment activity until now in the villages.

==== Tuồng or Hát bội ====
Hát tuồng or "hát bội" was imported from China around the 13th century and was used for entertaining royalty for a time before being adapted for traveling troupes of actors. Stories in the opera tend to be ostensibly historical and frequently focus on the rules of social decorum. Like chèo and other forms of opera from around the world, tuồng employs the use of stock characters who are recognizable from their make-up and costumes, which are typically very elaborate and extravagant.

==== Cải lương (modern folk opera) ====
Compared to tuồng and chèo, cải lương is more popular in modern Vietnam. Originating in the early 20th century, cải lương includes historical and contemporary themes. Cải lương has remained adaptable for modern innovations and now includes electric guitar and other new inventions. It is accompanied by nhạc tài tử, which is a complex and partially improvised form of chamber music.

Cải lương singing uses a great deal of vibrato; the words are extended when singing and the vibrato follows. A common melody used in cải lương is Vọng cổ.

Although cải lương remained extremely popular as late as the 1970s and the 1980s, nowadays this popularity has dwindled, especially among the younger generation, and the remaining troupes are only able to preserve the art because of government funding.

==== Rối nước ====
Water puppetry, or Múa rối nước, is a distinctively Vietnamese art form which arose in the 12th century. In water puppetry, a split-bamboo screen obscures puppeteers, who stand in water manipulating the puppets in front of the screen using long poles hidden beneath the water. Due to strict restrictions on learning the art of water puppetry, the form had nearly died out before the Maison des Cultures du Monde intervened in 1984 and helped reinvigorate the genre.

Today, water puppetry is popular with tourists to Vietnam.

=== Modernised traditional theatre (Kịch dân ca) ===
New types of theatre have emerged in Vietnam since the August Revolution, based on the music of local folk songs, such as kịch dân ca Bài chòi, kịch dân ca Huế, and kịch dân ca Nghệ Tĩnh...

==== Kịch dân ca Bài chòi ====
Kịch dân ca Bài chòi originated from the hobby of playing Bài chòi of the people of Quảng Nam – Đà Nẵng, later developed into a form of narrative poetry performance, story telling. The music originates from the folk tunes of the Central region such as Quảng Nam – Đà Nẵng, Huế, Quảng Trị..., with the main tunes being xuân nữ, nam xuân and xàng xê. The orchestra simply has only the đàn nhị, the sanh sứa, then the đàn nguyệt, and sinh tiền. The unique thing about Bài chòi opera is that an actor can defend many roles at the same time, with a simple orchestra but still attracts the audience (similar to Korean Pansori). Bài chòi was professionally developed from the foundation of the Inter-region V theatre Troupe with typical artists such as Lệ Thi.

==== Kịch dân ca Huế ====
Ca Huế is a genre of traditional music of Huế, Vietnam, including ca and lute, in many respects quite close to hát ả đào, made from idyllic folk music and royal court music and high tones.

== Theatre training institutions ==
The following institutions in Vietnam offer education and training in fields related to theatre:

Highest qualifications offered
Postgraduate degrees
Bachelor's degrees
Associate degrees (Vietnamese: Bằng Cao đẳng)
Vocational diploma (Vietnamese: Bằng Trung cấp)
Courses not offered

| University | Type | Location | Courses offered | | | | | | | Refs |
| University | Type | Location | Stage acting | Stage directing | Script writing for theatre | Stage lighting and sound design | Set design | Traditional Vietnamese theatre | Theatre studies | Refs |
|---|---|---|---|---|---|---|---|---|---|---|
| University of Theatre and Cinema Ho Chi Minh City | Public university | Ho Chi Minh City | Yes | Yes | No | Yes | Yes | Cải lương | No | |
| The University of Theatre and Cinema Hanoi [vi] | Public university | Hanoi | Yes | Yes | Yes | Yes | No | Cải lương, Chèo, Tuồng, Puppetry | Yes | |
| Military University of Culture and Arts [vi] | Public university | Hanoi | Yes | Yes | No | Yes | No | Cải lương and Đờn ca tài tử | No | |
| National University of Art Education [vi] | Public university | Hanoi | Yes | No | No | No | No | No | No | |
| Hanoi College of Arts | Public College | Hanoi | Yes | No | No | No | No | No | No | |
| Ho Chi Minh city College of Culture and Arts | Public College | Ho Chi Minh City | Yes | Yes | No | No | No | No | No | |
| Can Tho College of Culture and Arts [vi] | Public College | Cần Thơ | Yes | No | No | No | No | Cải lương | No | |
| Văn Lang University | Private university | Ho Chi Minh City | Yes | No | No | No | No | No | No | |

== Notable performers and writers ==
| Name | Genre(s) | Occupation(s) | | Notable works | Period | Location | |
| Name | Genre(s) | Performer | Writer | Notable works | Period | Location | Ref |
|---|---|---|---|---|---|---|---|
| Phạm Thị Trân (926–976) | Chèo | | | | Dinh Dynasty | Hải Dương | |
| Liêu Thủ Tâm (?-?) [vi] | Tuồng | | | | Dinh Dynasty and Anterior Lê dynasty | Hoa Lư (now part of Ninh Bình province) | |
| Đào Tấn (1845–1907) [vi] | Tuồng | | | | Late 19th – early 20th century | Bình Định (now part of Gia Lai province) | |
| Tống Hữu Định (1896–1932) | Cải lương | | | | Late 19th – early 20th century | Vĩnh Long province | |
| Năm Tú (born Châu Văn Tú) | Cải lương | | | | 20th century | Mỹ Tho | |
| Đào Thị Huệ [vi] (1411–1432) | Ca trù | | | | Later Lê dynasty | Hưng Yên | |
| Nguyễn Công Trứ (1778–1858) | Ca trù | | | | 19th century | Thái Bình | |
| Tản Đà (1889–1939) | Ca trù | | | | 20th century | Hanoi | |
| Vũ Đình Long (1896–1960) | Théâtre parlé ("Western" spoken play) | | | | 20th century | Hanoi | |
| Hà Thị Cầu (1928–2013) | Xẩm | | | | Contemporary | Nam Định | |

=== Vietnam theatre Day ===
In 2010, at the request of the Vietnam Association of Dramatic Artists, the Secretariat of the Party Central Committee issued a conclusion to recognize the 12th day of the eighth month in the Vietnamese calendar as the Vietnam theatre Day. The Prime Minister of Vietnam also issued Decision No. 13/QD-TTg dated January 4, 2011 recognizing the 12th day of the eighth month as Vietnam theatre Day.

== See also ==
- Music of Vietnam
- Traditional Vietnamese dance
- Culture of Vietnam
- History of Vietnam
