= Dance in Vietnam =

Dance in Vietnam comprises several different forms including dance as performed in Vietnamese theatre and opera, dances performed at festivals, and royal dances of the imperial court. Dance is thought to have been an integral part of Vietnamese culture since ancient times.

Vietnam is a diverse country with 54 different ethnic groups, with the ethnic Vietnamese (known as Kinh) making up the majority of the population. This article mainly focuses on the traditional dances of the ethnic Vietnamese, although each of the many ethnic minorities of Vietnam have their own rich culture and dance styles.

== Dancing in Vietnamese theatres ==
Much of Vietnamese theatre and Vietnamese music are intertwined with each other, as well as with Vietnamese dance. Popular theatre forms such as Hát tuồng, Hát chèo, and Cải lương all often feature dance, however these dances are performed in a liberal manner without set rules, unlike other more specific dance styles.

== Dances performed at festivals and important occasions ==
The lion dance was imported from China into Vietnamese culture where it developed its own distinct style. It is performed primarily at traditional festivals such as Tết (Lunar new year) and Tết trung thu (Mid-Autumn Festival), but also during other occasions such as the opening of a new business. The lion dance is highly symbolic, supposedly used to ward off evil spirits. There are an abundance of styles and the lion dances are typically accompanied by martial artists and acrobatics.

== Imperial court dances ==
Accompanied with Nhã nhạc (court music of the Trần dynasty to the Nguyễn dynasty) were the intricate dances of the Vietnamese Imperial court. Nhã Nhạc means "elegant music" when translated. While assuredly court dances existed before nhã nhạc in particular emerged, it is the Nguyễn dynasty form that is still highly preserved today, and has been declared along with the whole of nhã nhạc as an Intangible cultural heritage.

These dances require great skill and the dancers are often dressed in extravagant costumes. Currently, they are performed at festivals in Huế (múa cung đình Huế - court dance) or other special (often televised) occasions, in order to promote the traditional arts. Some of the most popular dances include (among others):

- Fan dance - vũ phiến
- Lantern dance - lục cúng hoa đăng
- Lotus dance - múa sen, múa bài bông
- Flag dance
- Platter dance - múa mâm
- Candle dance
- Incense dance
- Hat dance - múa nón
- Scarf dance
- Lion dance -múa lân
- Ribbon dance
- Parasol dance

The meaning of "múa" extends to Múa rối nước - water puppetry

== See also ==
- Culture of Vietnam
- History of Vietnam
