= Tình anh bán chiếu =

Vietnamese folk opera song

- Ca cổ by Viễn Châu
- English: Love of the Mat Seller
- Year: 1959
- Genre: Vọng cổ
- Language: Vietnamese

Tình anh bán chiếu (English: Love of the Mat Seller) is the ca cổ which was written in 1959 by People's Artist Viễn Châu. This brought People's Artist Út Trà Ôn into the supreme class in cải lương. This is the "King of Vọng Cổ", when mentioning Vien Chau, people immediately remember "Tình anh bán chiếu".

== Origin ==
Viễn Châu wrote many very famous Vọng cổ songs (or written the vọng cổ libretto), contribute to bringing names of artists to new heights like: "Tôn Tẫn giả điên, Đời, Hòn vọng phu, Gánh nước đêm khuya, Võ Đông Sơ, Bạch Thu Hà,...". All are very well known and registered copyright.

== Content ==
This song is based on a story between a girl and a mat vendor (whose hometown was in Cà Mau). He loved her dearly, but she left to get married from elsewhere. In the end, he confessed his love to her.
