= Xẩm =

Type of Vietnamese folk music

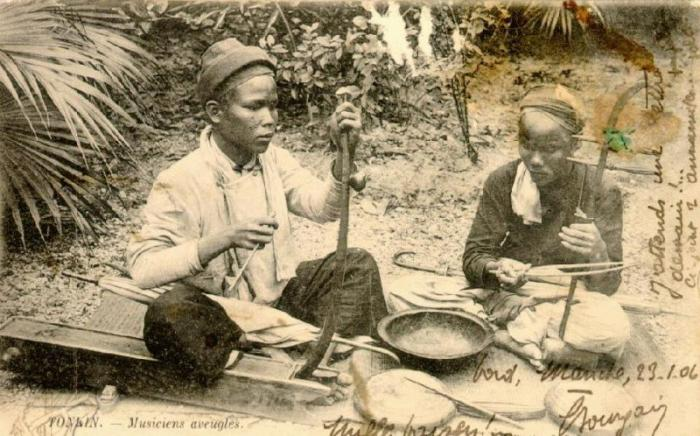
Blind artists performing xẩm in an old French postcard.

Xẩm (Chữ Nôm: 眈) or Hát xẩm (咭眈, Xẩm singing) is a type of Vietnamese folk music which was popular in the Northern region of Vietnam but is nowadays considered an endangered form of traditional music in Vietnam. In the dynastic time, xẩm was generally performed by blind artists who wandered from town to town and earned their living by singing in common places. Xẩm artists often play đàn bầu or đàn nhị to accompany the songs themselves, and sometimes they form a band with one singer and others who play traditional instruments such as the drum or phách. The melodies of xẩm are borrowed from different types of Vietnamese folk music such as trống quân or quan họ, while its themes are generally The Tale of Kiều, Lục Vân Tiên, and other popular Vietnamese stories.

== History and performers ==
The origin of xẩm was dated from the Trần dynasty in the 14th century. During the dynastic time, xẩm was popular in the Northern region of Vietnam. Traditionally, xẩm was performed by blind artists who wandered from town to town and earned their living by singing in common places such as markets or communal temples. At the beginning of the 20th century, xẩm artists performed on the trams of the public transport system of Hanoi, so this type of folk music was sometimes called xẩm tàu điện (tram xẩm).

When the tram lines were abandoned in the 1980s, xẩm tàu điện disappeared and xẩm gradually fell into oblivion. Facing the unstoppable decline of xẩm, researchers and devoted artists tried but failed to revitalize this art form. Nowadays, xẩm is considered an endangered form of Vietnamese traditional music because the number of experienced artists rapidly declines while the younger generation usually prefers modern types of music. The most famous recent artisan of this art form was Hà Thị Cầu (1917-2013), the so-called "last surviving artisan of xẩm." She was one of the few artisans who was honoured by the title Nghệ sĩ ưu tú (Outstanding Artist of Vietnam). There are several efforts to preserve and propagate xẩm, such as the introduction of xẩm performance in the Đồng Xuân night market, and encouraging young artists to learn xẩm from old artisans.

== Performance elements ==
The melodies of xẩm are borrowed from different types of Vietnamese folk music such as trống quân, quan họ, chèo or lullabies. Themes of xẩm songs are often drawn from popular stories, poems and legends in Vietnam like Truyện Kiều, Lục Vân Tiên, Thạch Sanh or Nhị độ mai. Through the content of the songs and the style of performance, xẩm artists told about their tragic lives or the misery of the poor people and thus evoked pity from their audience. Today, there are about 400 xẩm songs which are still preserved. They are mainly handed down orally from generation to generation.

In singing xẩm, the artists often play đàn bầu or đàn nhị to self-accompany, and sometimes they form a band in which one artist sings while others play traditional instruments such as the drum or phách. Depending on the rhythm of the drum, xẩm is divided into two styles, xẩm chợ for a rapid rhythm and xẩm cô đào for a slow one.
