= Cảnh =

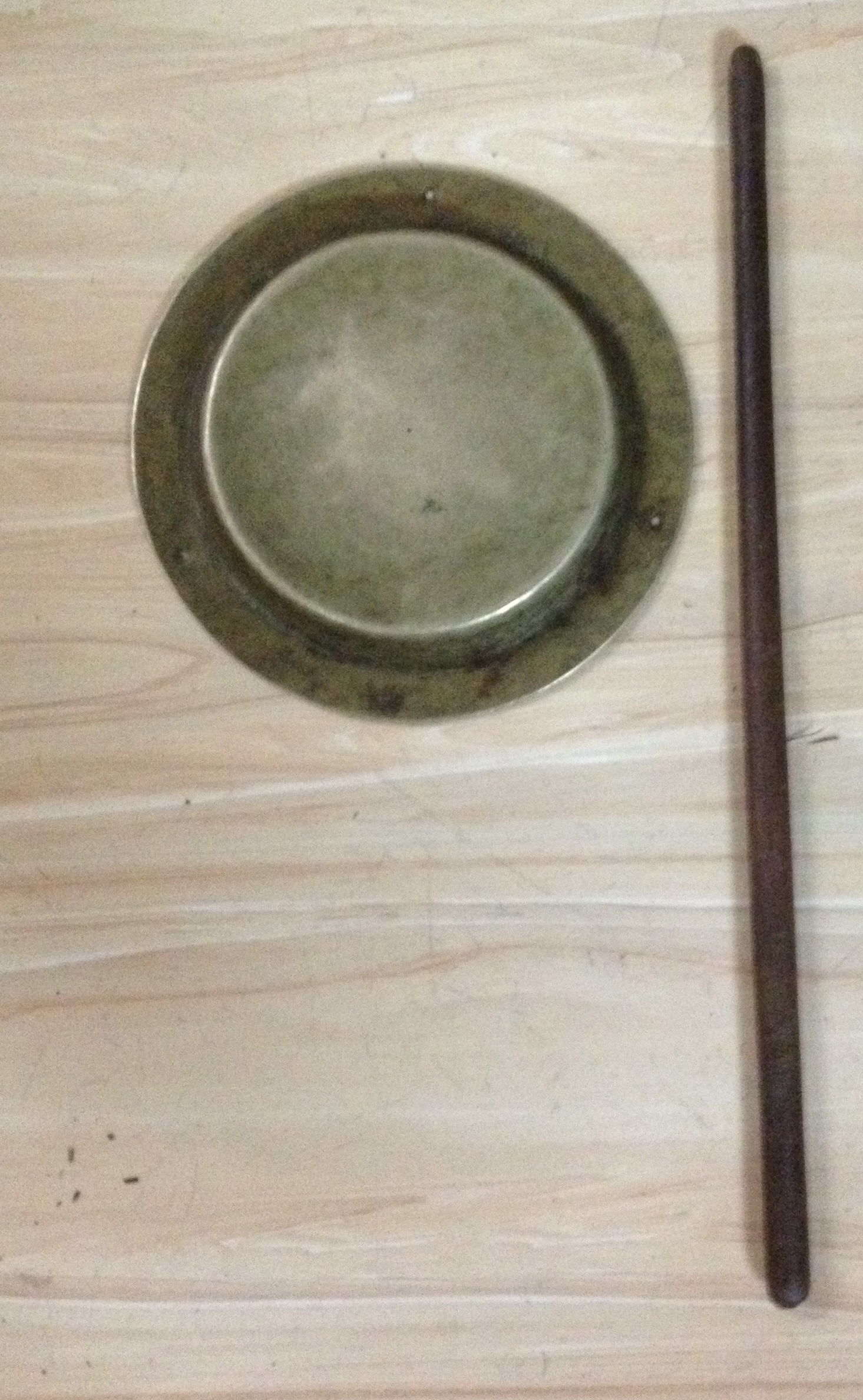

The cảnh or tiu cảnh is a Vietnamese musical instrument. It is a form of small cymbal. It is part of the basic set of percussion instruments used for chầu văn alongside the phách bamboo clappers and the trống, a small two-headed barrel drum. These percussion instruments are placed on the floor and struck with wooden beaters.
