= Trống cơm =

Traditional Vietnamese drum

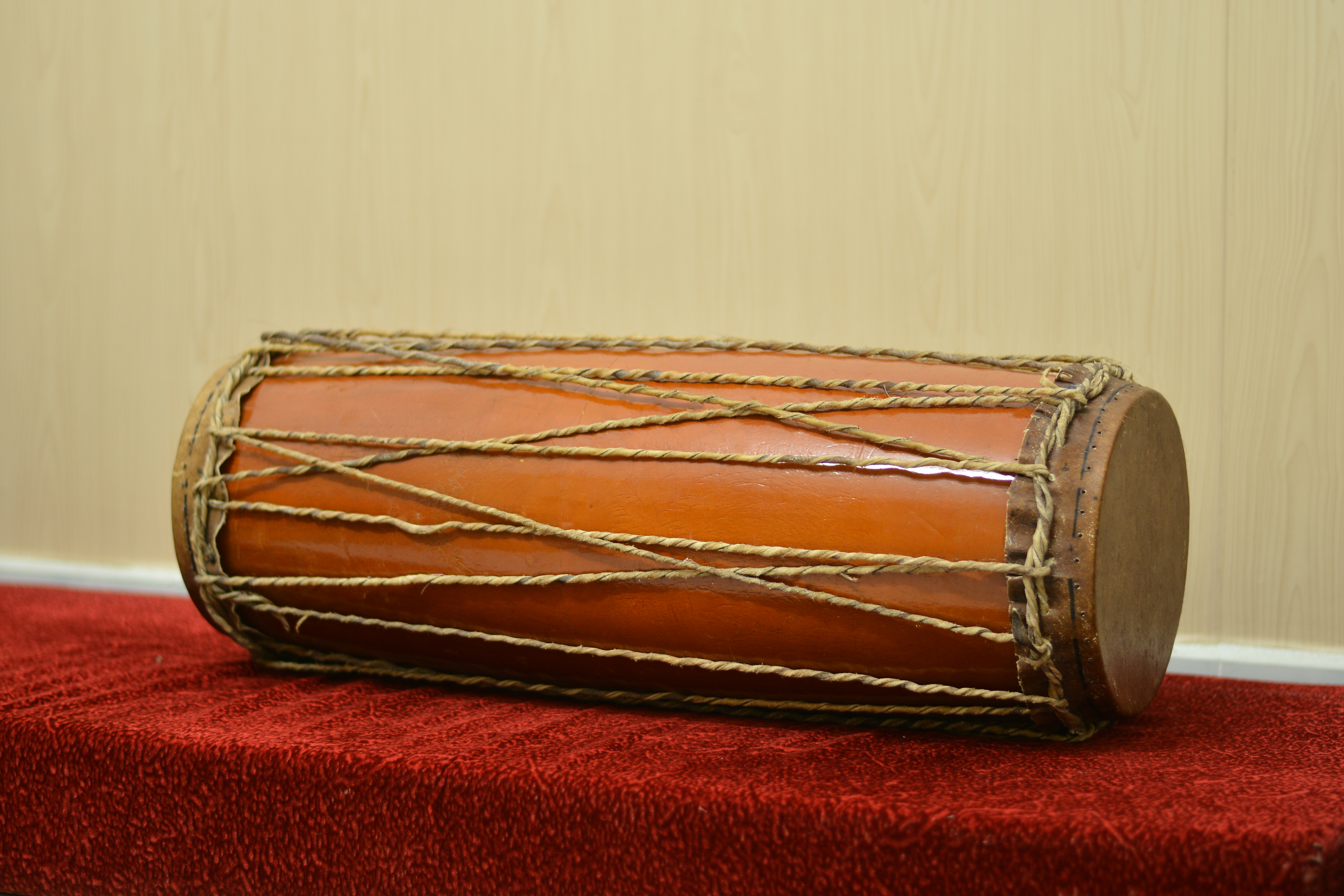
Trống cơm

Trống cơm (lit. "rice drum") is a kind of traditional barrel-shaped Vietnamese drum, bearing similarities to the Chinese yaogu, and the Khmer skor sang na. It is an integral instrument in the hát bội orchestra and is also featured prominently in the Hát chèo repertoire.

The trống cơm is a long, cylindrical drum with percussion surfaces on both ends. When stationary, it is positioned horizontally in front of the performer, who strikes the drumheads with their hands. Alternatively, drumsticks may be used. For performances that involve movement, the drum is slung over the shoulders with a sash, resting horizontally across the performer's abdomen, allowing it to be played on the go.

The drum derives its name, "rice drum," from the practice of smearing a layer of cooked rice onto its surface for tuning purposes. This technique is similar to the methods used for tuning drums in Cambodia and Thailand. The two drumheads are traditionally tuned five notes apart, creating a distinct tonal range.

Beyond its role as a musical instrument, the trống cơm has deeply integrated into the folk music traditions of the Vietnamese people through the Northern folk song of the same name. This song, with its cheerful melody and communal spirit, reflects the everyday life and cultural essence of the Bắc Bộ region, further cementing the trống cơm as a symbol of Vietnamese folk heritage.
