= Dạ cổ hoài lang =

Song
- Language: Vietnamese
- Published: 1919
- Venue: Bac Lieu, Viet Nam
- Songwriter: Cao Văn Lầu

Dạ cổ hoài lang (Vietnamese: [zâːˀ ko᷉ hwâːj laːŋ], which means "Night Drum Beats Cause Longing for Absent Husband") is a Vietnamese song, composed circa 1918 by songwriter Cao Văn Lầu (colloquially known as "Sáu Lầu") in Bạc Liêu. It was a massive hit across Viet Nam in 1927 as it was taken up by travelling troupes and spawned many variants, versions and imitators.

The song Dạ cổ hoài lang marked the beginning of the iconic vọng cổ melody, which has become a subgenre on its own within the Art of Đờn ca tài tử music and song in southern Viet Nam and the Art of Cải lương music that for many people Lầu's Dạ cổ hoài lang is still synonymous with vọng cổ.
