= Dong Xuan =

Dong Xuan may refer to:

- Dong Xuan (Han dynasty) (董宣), style name Shaoping (少平), Eastern Han dynasty official, see Book of the Later Han
- Đồng Xuân District, a district in Phu Yen Province, Vietnam
- Đồng Xuân Market, a market in Hanoi, Vietnam
- Dong Xuan (actress), a Chinese actress.
