= Long Tuyền (ancient village) =

Long Tuyền (Vietnamese: Làng cổ Long Tuyền) is an ancient village in Cần Thơ city, Mekong Delta, Vietnam. The village is located on the southwest part of Cần Thơ River. It used to be a subdivision of Luc Ap before Cần Thơ Province was incorporated, then it became Binh Hung village during the reign of emperor Thiệu Trị of the Nguyễn dynasty. In 1852, following the arrival of Huynh Man Dat, a province chief who escaped from danger to this site, this village was renamed Bình Thủy.

This village is one of the most visited tourist attractions in this city since it contains 6 national relics, or one-third of the relics in Cần Thơ. This village features typical lifestyle in Mekong Delta with its channel landscapes, orchards, traditional local lifestyle.

== Bùi Hữu Nghĩa ==
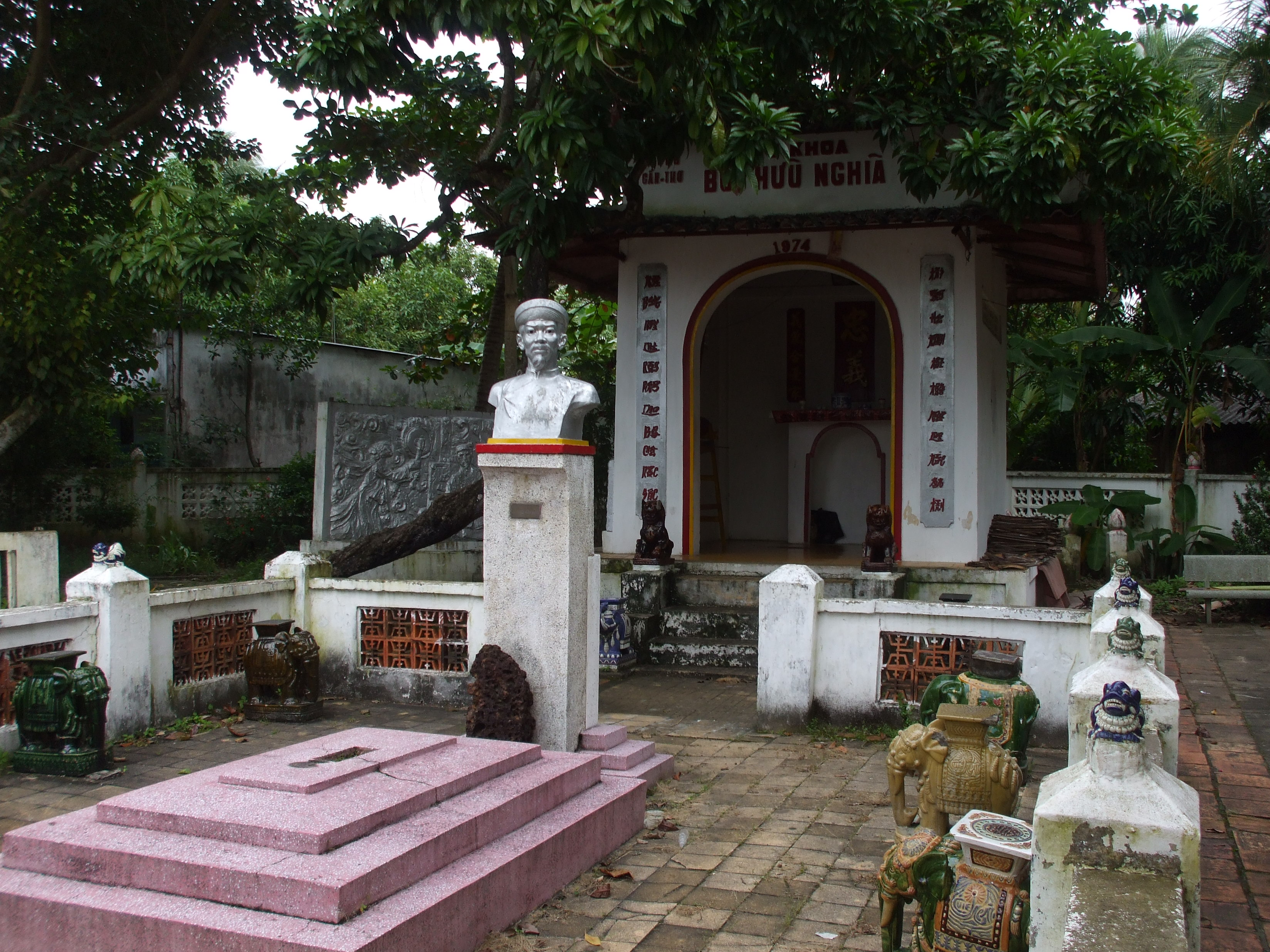
Bùi Hữu Nghĩa's tomb and temple in Long Tuyền

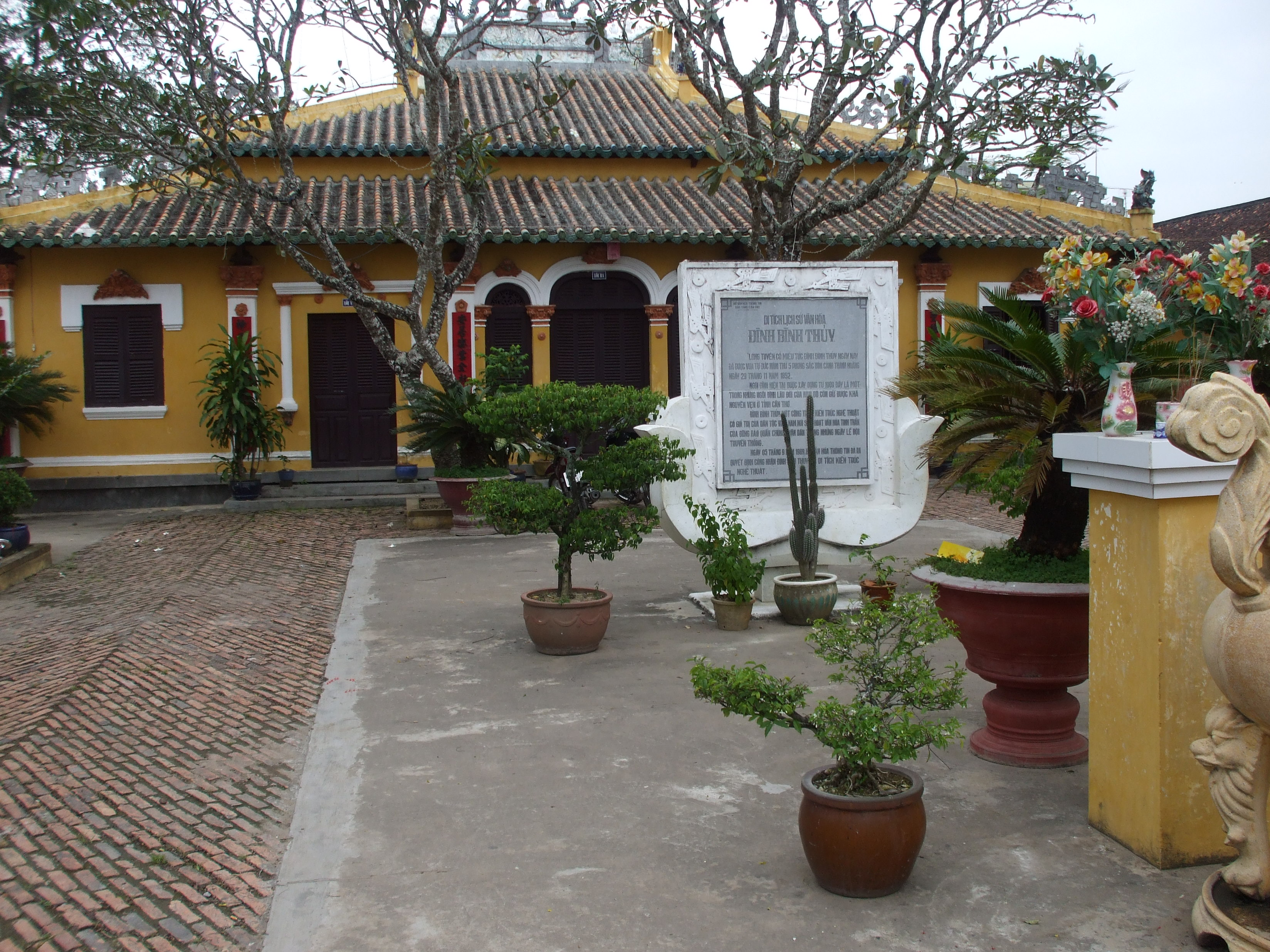
Đình Bình Thủy in Long Tuyền

Nam Nhã Temple in Long Tuyền

Long Tuyền was the birthplace of Bùi Hữu Nghĩa (1807-1872), one of 4 famous learned in Cochinchina, dubbed "Golden Dragon of Đồng Nai land".

Tran Huu Nghia successfully passed one of the royal exams and contributed greatly to Vietnamese literature. However, what made him well known lay in the fact that he made hát tuồng, then a royal music performance, popular to the ordinary people. The famous tuồng play Kim thạch kỳ duyên was one of the earliest of tuồng plays, it was performed in all provinces of Mekong Delta Region and it was the first play of this kind translated into French.
