= Năm Phỉ =

Vietnamese actress, singer (1906–1954)

- Born: Lê Thị Phỉ; 1906; Điều Hòa Village, Mỹ Tho Town, Mỹ Tho Province, Cochinchina
- Died: 2 June 1954 (aged 47–48); Saigon, Cochinchina, State of Vietnam
- Occupations: Actress, singer, manager
- Years active: 1916–1954
- Spouse(s): Hai Giỏi; Nguyễn Phước Cương

Meritorious Artist Năm Phỉ (1906–1954, (Vietnamese: Kịch-sĩ Năm-Phỉ)) was a Vietnamese actress and singer.

== Early life ==
Năm Phỉ's real name is Lê Thị Phỉ (Chinese: 黎氏馡), given to her by her father "Công thành danh toại, phỉ chí nam nhi, bia truyền tạc để". Her father was a civil engineer; all of his 11 children attended the cải lương theatre. She was born in 1906 at Mỹ Tho town.

== Career ==
She began her career as a child singer at 10. Her father later renounced her. From 1926 to the beginning World War II, she worked with companies, such as Nam Đồng band, Tái Đồng band, Văn Hí band, Phước Cương band. She came to Europe to perform and record at Paris Expositions, in 1931 and 1937.

At her peak, Năm Phỉ's worth was about 230 thousand (≈ some thousand ounces). She received 186 love letters, 1009 postcards, 167 photographs and was discussed in 42 articles.

Nữ diễn viên tài nghệ này muốn dẫn dắt ta đến đâu cũng được.
To everywhere we were led by this clever actress's wish.

— La Comédia's journalist

== Career ==
- Tham phú phụ bần
- Ơn đến oán trả
- Thiện ác hữu báo
- Bội thê thiên xử
- Chí Thiện - Chí Hiếu
- Sắc đẹp giết người
- Vì đâu nên nỗi
- Lý Ngọc Nương in The lady with the camellias
- Pang Consort in The case of Pang Consort
- Diaochan in Lü Bu wheedles Diaochan (or Phụng Nghi House)
- Mộng Hoa in Lady Mộng Hoa
- Lan in Lan and Điệp

== Honor ==
- Four medals of Paris Exposition.
- Kim Tiền Medal by Emperor Bảo Đại pre-1940.
- The designating as Lê Thị Phỉ Road at Mỹ Tho City.

== Personal life ==
Năm Phỉ married actor Hai Giỏi before she was 18, however he died shortly after. After 1926, she remarried with manager Nguyễn Phước Cương, who was a descendant of Emperor Thành Thái. Her second marriage only lasted a few years before divorce. Mr Nguyễn Phước Cương remarried Năm Phỉ's younger sister Bảy Nam. Phước Cương and Bảy Nam's daughter Kim Cương called her as Momma.
