= Cao Văn Lầu =

Vietnamese musician

Vietnamese musician Cao Văn Lầu playing a Đàn nguyệt.

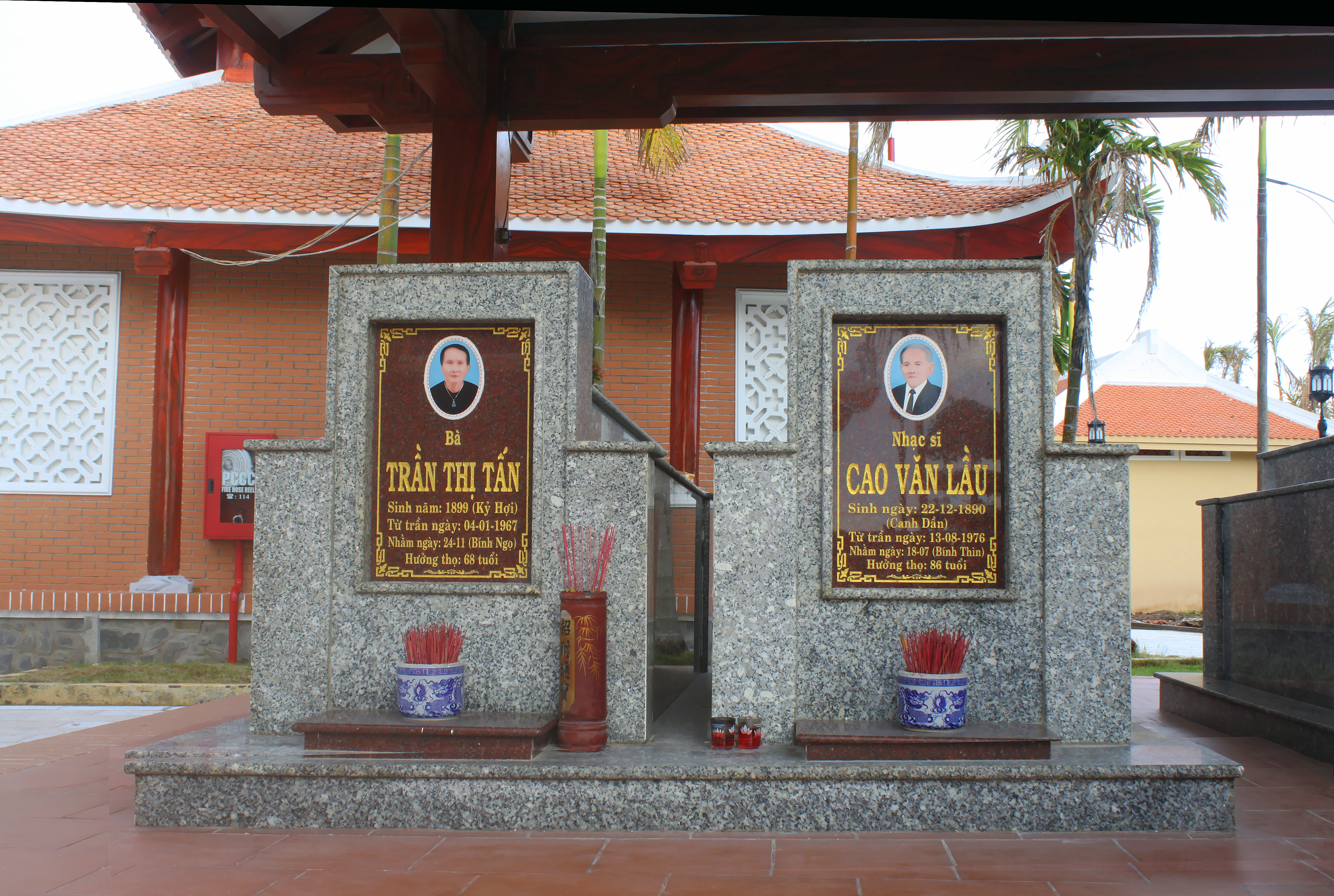
Tomb of Cao Văn Lầu and his wife in the Memorial area for the art of Đờn ca tài tử and musician Cao Văn Lầu in Bạc Liêu city, Bạc Liêu province, Vietnam.

Cao Văn Lầu (22 December 1892 – 13 August 1976), also known as Sáu Lầu (Lầu the Sixth in Vietnamese), was a Vietnamese musician. He was the original composer of the song vọng cổ which started a new genre of cải lương music in the 1920s.

He was born on 22 December 1892 in Long An province, French Cochinchina. At the age of 4, he moved to Bạc Liêu and spent all his life there. In Bạc Liêu, he studied chữ Hán with a monk and then attended a French primary school. In 1907, Lầu stopped schooling because of his poverty. In 1908, he began learning music from local musician Lê Tài Khí and began his music career four year later. In 1913, he married a woman named Trần Thị Tấn.

Because Tấn was not pregnant after three years of marriage, Lầu was forced to send his wife back to her family due to local custom. This separation inspired Cao Văn Lầu to compose his best known love-song Dạ cổ hoài lang (Night Drum Beats Cause Longing for Absent Husband), a song that has had a great influence on cải lương music. He died on August 13, 1976, in Bạc Liêu.
