= Bạch Tuyết =

Vietnamese singer

NSND Bạch Tuyết
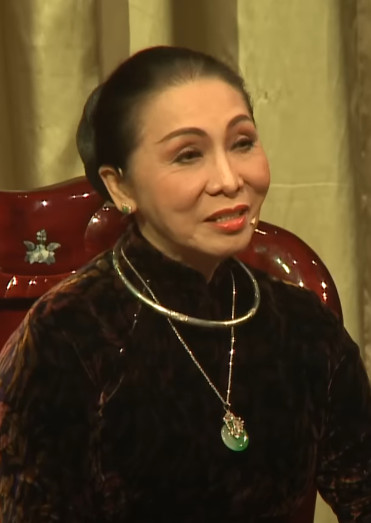
- Born: 1945 (age 80–81); An Giang, French Indochina
- Education: Royal Academy of Dramatic Art and National Academy for Theatre and Film Arts (PhD)
- Occupations: Singer, actress in the Cải lương genre

NSND Bạch Tuyết (born 1945) is a Vietnamese singer, actress, director, and scriptwriter of the Cải lương genre. She is the only person in Vietnam to hold a PhD in Cải lương. She was granted the status of "People's Artist", one of the highest honors for artists in Vietnam, in 2012. Her song Ve Nghe Me Ru was awarded Song of the Year in the TikTok Vietnam Awards in 2022. She was named to the Forbes 50 Over 50 in 2024.

== Biography ==
She was born in Long Xuyên, a city in An Giang province in Vietnam. She first became interested in pursuing Cải lương as a career after being told by one of her idols, actress Thanh Nga, that she had potential, and made her debut at 16. She got her first big role after the main actress was late in a production of La tham chi hong. She continued to play in other plays, and after just two years, earned the Thanh Tam Award for her promise. She later went on to play other notable roles, including Dương Vân Nga.

She also became known for her passion for knowledge: She entered university at the age of 40, studying education. She then began studying stage directing in Sofia in 1988. That same year, she was awarded the title of Meritorious Artist in 1988. She received a PhD in 1995, awarded jointly by the Royal Academy of Dramatic Art and the National Academy for Theatre and Film Arts. This made her the first and only Cải lương artist with a PhD. The public eventually questioned whether she'd actually received a PhD, so she responded by showing her official diplomas.

She has also worked as a stage director, a scriptwriter, and a singer. As of 2024, she has participated in over 500 plays. She was also the first female Cải lương artist to appear in experimental stages as a solo performer. She has collaborated with younger singers such as the rapper Pháo , and served as a judge on game shows.

She became a People's Artist, the highest honor for a living artist in Vietnam, in 2012.

She was awarded Music of the Year in the TikTok Awards Vietnam in 2022 for a song called Ve Nghe Me Ru. She was named to the Forbes 50 over 50 in 2024.

== Personal life ==
Her first husband was Phạm Huỳnh Tam Lang, but they divorced after seven years as she didn't give birth to a son. Her second husband was a French-Vietnamese billionaire, but they also divorced.

She is Buddhist and resides in a villa she designed in Thu Duc.
