= Đờn ca tài tử =

Music genre

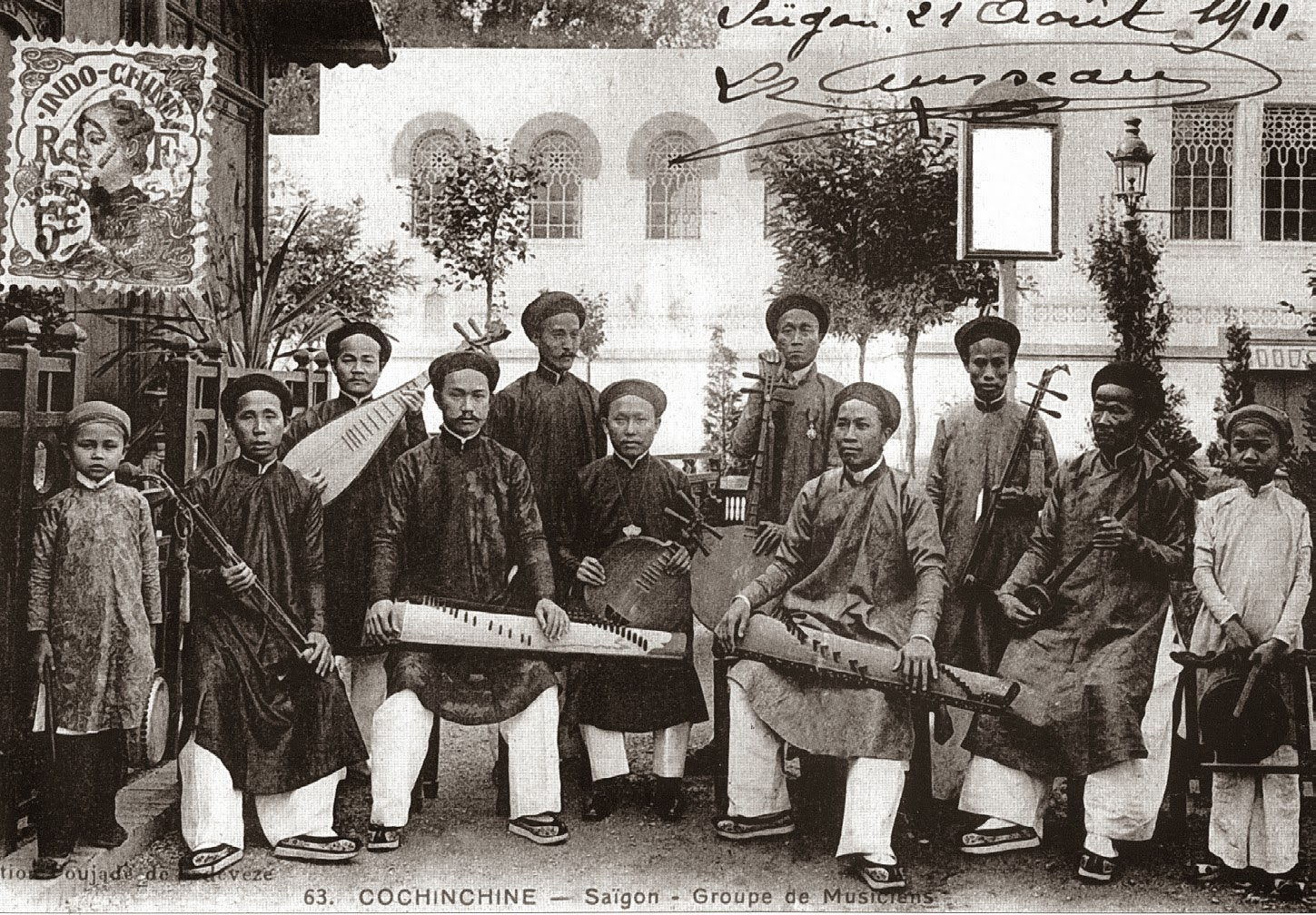
Đờn ca tài tử Orchestra in Saigon, 1911

Đờn ca tài tử (Chữ Hán: 彈歌才子) or nhạc tài tử (樂才子) is a genre of chamber music in the traditional music of southern Vietnam. Its instrumentation resembles that of the ca Huế style; additionally, modified versions of the European instruments guitar, violin, and steel guitar are used. Vọng cổ ("Longing for the Past") is one of the more popular tài tử melodies, and was composed in 1919 by songwriter ông Sáu Lầu, of Bạc Liêu Province in southern Vietnam.

== Etymology ==
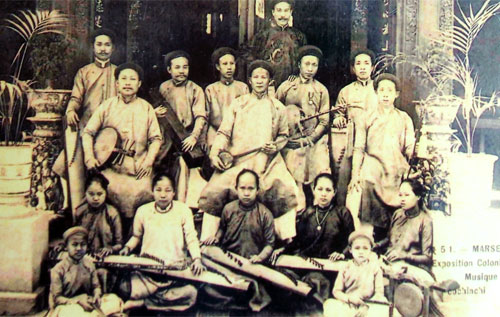
Đờn ca tài tử Orchestra by Nguyễn Tống Triều attended the fair of colonial countries in Marseille, France, in 1906.

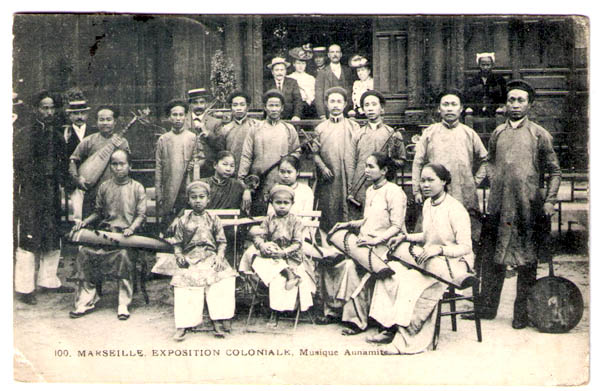
Đờn ca tài tử Orchestra in Marseille, France, 1906

The term comes from the Sino-Vietnamese terms nhạc (樂, literally "music") and tài tử (才子, literally "virtuoso"; the original Chinese meaning was "gifted scholar").

== Performance ==
The ensemble commonly uses five instruments, often referred to as the “Ngũ Tuyệt” (Five Treasures), which include the đàn tranh (16-string zither), đàn tỳ bà (pear-shaped lute), đàn kìm (moon lute), đàn cò (spike fiddle), and đàn tam (three-string lute). These are often accompanied by the sound of the seven-hole bamboo flute.

In terms of attire, most performers of Đờn ca tài tử are friends and neighbors, so they typically wear casual clothing during performances. Only when performing at temples, communal houses, or on formal stages do they wear traditional performance costumes.

In recent years, to meet the demands of tourism, tài tử music groups have organized into semi-professional clubs. Alongside their main occupations, they perform music upon request.

Some people say the term “tài tử” means “amateur.” In reality, it means “talented,” and implies that these individuals do not pursue music for a living, but rather as a passion or for spontaneous enjoyment. However, this does not mean they lack expertise. On the contrary, to become a true tài tử artist, one must undergo years of dedicated practice.

Musically, the roles of singers and instrumentalists are equal. In ca trù, a traditional form of northern and central Vietnamese singing, the performers are usually women, whereas đờn ca tài tử includes both male and female singers who participate equally.

Đờn ca tài tử uses instruments such as the đàn cò, đàn nguyệt, đàn tranh, the song lan (a wooden percussion instrument for rhythm), and sometimes the lõm guitar (a modified guitar used in southern Vietnamese music). This form of music is performed not only at festivals and gatherings but also after harvest seasons. It can be played under the shade of a tree, on a boat, or on a bright moonlit night.

== See also ==
- Guitar phím lõm
- Vọng cổ
- Cải lương
- Vietnamese music
