= Cải lương Chung Vô Diệm =

Cải Lương: Chung Vô Diệm is a series of four individual plays of cải lương, released in DVD form. It tells the story of an ugly woman named Chung Vô Diệm who became the Queen of King of Qi in Warring States period of China. It is based on the apocryphal novel of same name which is widely circulated in China.

== Plot ==
The series consists of four plays.

=== Part I: Mão Đoan Tinh xuất thế ===
This part recounts the rendezvous of Chung Vô Diệm and King of Qi Điền Hằng in a mulberry garden and her subsequent enthronement as the Queen of Qi. The King of Qi, advised by his close strategist, takes a stroll through the countryside. He encounters a tiger and when fleeing for his life, is saved by a veiled Chung Vô Diệm. Grateful and full with anticipation, the King promises to make her his queen. Chung Vô Diệm then lifts the veil and upon which the King is so scared by her demonic appearance that he immediately goes back on his words. Chung Vô Diệm, nevertheless, is born with supernatural powers as her previous incarnation is a fairy. She threatens to beat the King if he ever dares to cheat her and the King reluctantly sticks to his promise, with his advisor Yến Anh as the witness to the marriage pact.

The King has no intention to create such an ugly woman as his Queen whatsoever and as soon as he arrives at his palace, ignores to keep his promise. This prompts Chung Vô Diệm to come to the capital herself to press his to fulfilling his part of the pact. Faced with death threat again, the King has to officially declare her his Queen and gives her the Palace of Chiêu Dương as her royal residence. It turns out to be another ruse of the King to get rid of her because the Palace has been run over by devils which has killed the first Queen. Chung Vô Diệm succeeds to drive out the residential demons and retrieves a lot of magical artifacts. The King, seeing her alive and kicking, struggles to find words to console and appease her. Having overcome her first challenge, Chung Vô Diệm's position as Queen of Qi is solidified.

The King's object of favor is then a concubine named Cao Kim Liên who is beautiful and talented as a dancer. Initially apprehensive of Chung Vô Diệm, she grows increasingly resentful towards the newly instated queen, seeing her as the one who seized her rightful throne. To eliminate the queen and pave the way for herself, she schemes, with implicit agreement from the King, to poison Chung Vô Diệm. The queen, with her divination skills, reads through her scheme and forces the concubine to gulp down her own poisoned wine.

Credit rolls as the concubine succumbs to the effects of her poison and the King arrives, apparently angered with his queen.

=== Part II: Chung Vô Diệm đại náo hội Kỳ Bàn ===
Accused of murdering Cao Kim Liên in the previous part, Chung Vô Diệm is confined to the Cold Palace as a punishment. The Kings also recruits two beautiful women as his concubines: Trương Túy Vân as Eastern Consort and Hạ Nghinh Xuân as Western Consort.

The neighbor State of Yan, in an attempt to humiliate the State of Qi, has its envoy present a qin with strings made from lotus threads. No one is able to play the instrument and the King is advised to counsel the banished Queen. Chung Vô Diệm manages to play the instrument and has derogatory poems tattooed on the face of the envoy. As a result, war breaks out between countries. The King leads the army to counter the enemy but is surrounded in a border post. The Queen comes to his rescue. Despite being grateful to her for saving his life and his kingdom the second time, he cannot bring himself to consummate the marriage. The Queen's teacher then gives her a pair of earrings that changes her visage to be more beautiful and the royal couple has three nights with blissful love. After that, Chung Vô Diệm becomes pregnant.

Wars and confrontations continue to plague the border and during a battle, the Queen gives birth to her son. With enemies closing behind, she prays for the gods to conceal her newborn and rushes to the aid of her husband.

Back in the palace, the two new concubines scheme their ways to royal favor. Hạ Nghinh Xuân tricks Trương Túy Vân into expressing her hatred for Chung Vô Diệm and later counsels her to poison the Queen - the same ruse used by Cao Kim Liên before. The Eastern Consort is apprehensive in the first place but when a royal edict comes and dictates her to welcome the triumphant Queen, she becomes resolute. As she leaves to receive the returning Queen, Hạ Nghinh Xuân goes into a monologue, revealing the whole sweet talk as her grand scheme: to remove Trương Túy Vân as a romantic rival since she knows the ruse can be easily discovered by Chung Vô Diệm and to get rid of Chung Vô Diệm as the King will not spare her life if she kills Trương Túy Vân.

== Casting ==
A feature production, the series enlist the services of the most veteran actors/singers. Tài Linh played the role of Chung Vô Diệm and was the only actress to reprise the same role over the course of the long story. Many roles were acted by various actors/actresses and some played more than one role as the narration proceeded.

King of Qi Điền Hằng was played by Kim Tử Long in the first and second part and by Thanh Tòng in the following two parts. Thanh Tòng himself played the role of Yến Anh in the first part and was succeeded by Bửu Truyện in the next installments.

Kim Tử Long played various roles in the series: he starred King of Qi in the first two seasons, his adopted son Điền Côn in the third season and the future King of Qi Điền Nguyên in the finale. Chí Linh sticks to the portrait of righteous generals, starring Tôn Tháo in the first season and Điền Đơn in the last season. Bửu Truyện co-starred two roles at the same time - as the ignorant father of Chung Vô Diệm and as the adviser Yến Anh in the latter three sections and as it can be seen, the two never appear onstage together. Various males presents different characters and the heavy makeup allowed them to assume different identities.

Actresses underwent drastic changes in terms of character personalities. Thoại Mỹ was the patriotic Princess Yên Đơn in the first session and turned vicious as the treacherous Hạ Nghinh Xuân in the following three sessions. Vân Hà got the chance to display her varied acting: she played the gossipy and nosy second sister-in-law of Chung Vô Diệm in the first play, the beautiful yet vain and shallow Eastern Consort Trương Túy Vân in the second and third plays and the loyal and considerate Liêm Thoại Hoa - wife of Điền Côn in the fourth play. Thảo Nguyên, a less-known name, played Chung Vô Diệm's clumsy first sister-in-law in the first play and the handsome and chaste Northern Consort Trịnh Ngọc Thuyền in the last play.
