= Đồng Xuân Market =

Dong Xuan Market
- Chợ Đồng Xuân
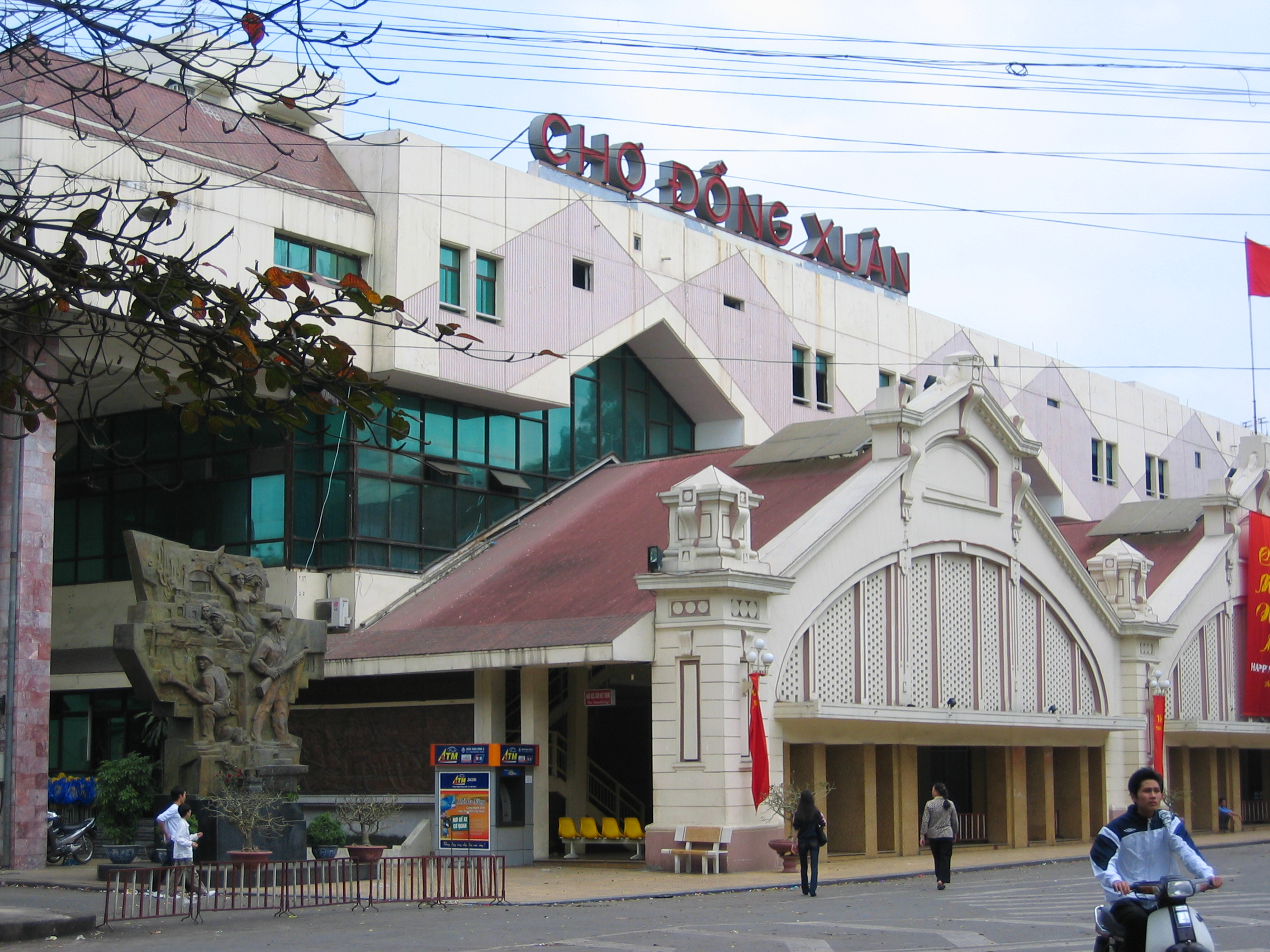
- Đồng Xuân Market
- Interactive map of the Dong Xuan Market area
- Alternative names: Springfield Market

General information
- Type: Market
- Location: Hanoi, Vietnam
- Coordinates: 21.038164°N 105.850031°E
- Construction started: 1889
- Renovated: 1994
- Owner: Đồng Xuân Shareholding Company

Đồng Xuân Market (Vietnamese: Chợ Đồng Xuân; chữ Nôm: 𢄂同春) is a market in the center district Hoàn Kiếm of Hanoi, Vietnam. Originally built by the French administration in 1889, Đồng Xuân Market has been renovated several times with the latest being in 1994 after a fire that almost destroyed the market. Nowadays, Đồng Xuân Market is the largest covered market of Hanoi where the wholesale traders sell everything from clothes and household goods to foodstuffs.

== History ==
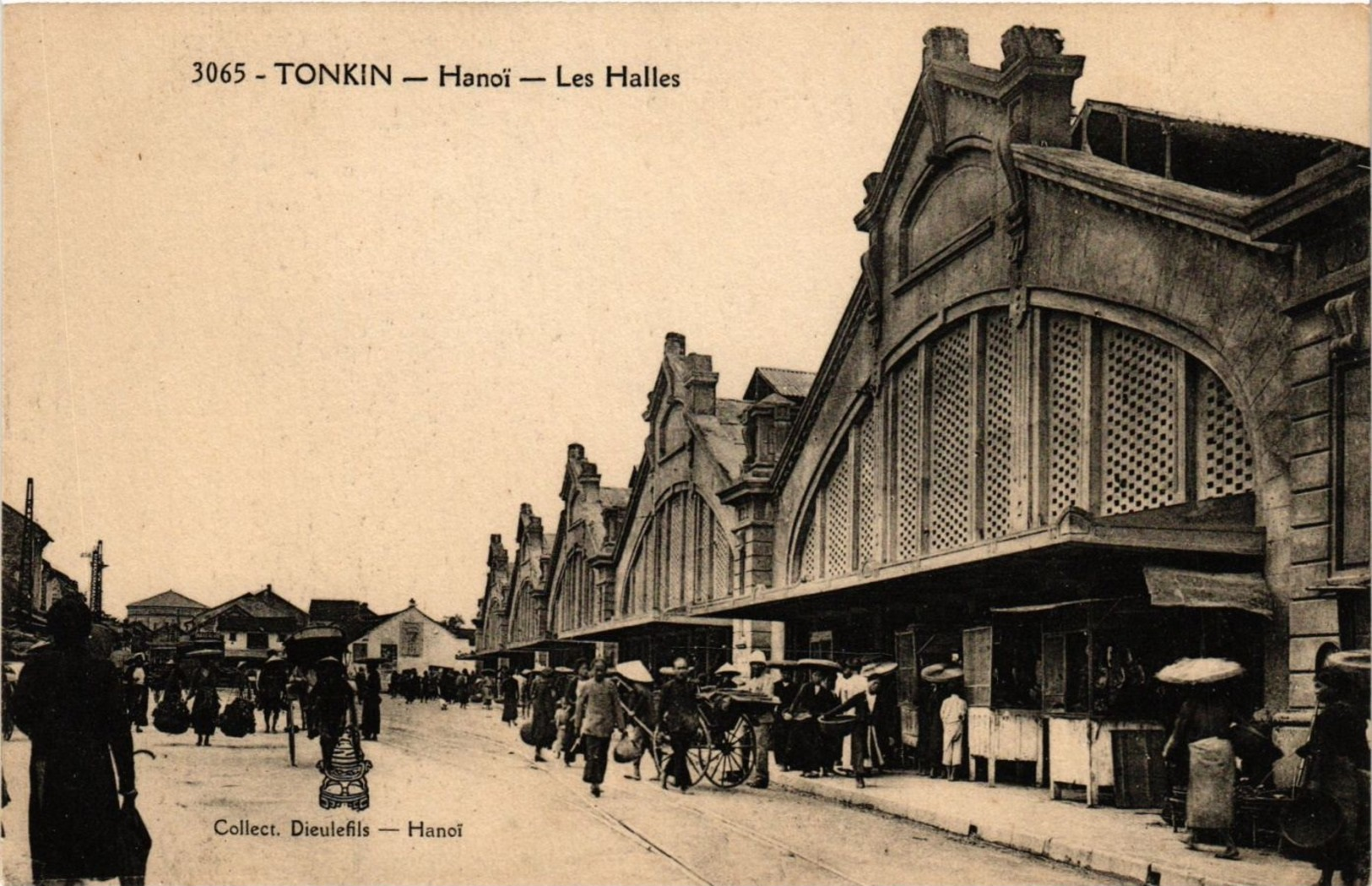
Đồng Xuân Market in an old French postcard

At the end of the 19th century, the Old Quarter of Hanoi had two main marketplaces, one at Hang Duong Street and the other at Hang Ma Street. In 1889, these two markets were closed and replaced by the original Đồng Xuân Market which was built by the order of the French administration in 1889 as one of the principal new architectures of Hanoi, together with Long Biên Bridge which was located nearby and completed in 1902. The market was constructed in Hanoi's Old Quarter, only 600 m north of Hoàn Kiếm Lake. The covered area of the market was about 6.500 m^{2} with a large roof of corrugated galvanized iron supplied by the French contractor Paul-François Leyret The most recognizable feature of the market was the 5-arch entrance corresponding to Dong Xuan Market's five domes, each dome was measured 19 m in height and 25 m in width. When the First Indochina War broke out in Hanoi in early 1947, a fierce struggle between Việt Minh and French forces took place in the area of the market on February 14. To commemorate the event, a memorial was erected near the principal gate of the market in 2005.

In 1994, the market was nearly destroyed by a disastrous fire that claimed the loss of about 4.5 million USD worth of stock. After the fire, Dong Xuan Market was partially rebuilt in the original form and it is still the largest covered market of Hanoi. The ward to which the market belongs is also named Đồng Xuân (phường Đồng Xuân), this is one of the busiest commercial places in Hanoi with about half of the total number of households has trading activities.

== Activities ==
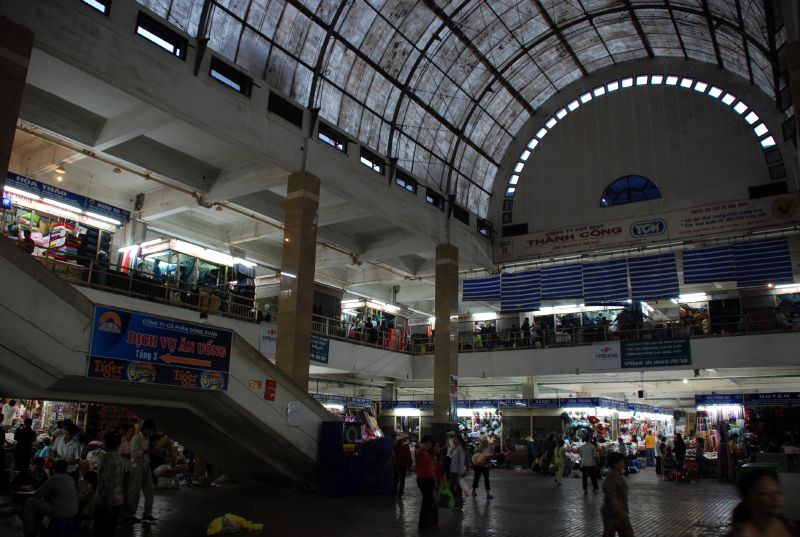
Interior space of Dong Xuan Market.

Nowadays, the market is run by the Đồng Xuân Shareholding Company (Công ty cổ phần Đồng Xuân), its three stories are divided into stalls for wholesale and small traders who sell clothes or household goods, foodstuffs of every kind from fresh vegetables to Vietnamese dishes are also found at the rear of the market. As the biggest wholesale market of Hanoi, Đồng Xuân Market has to face problems such as counterfeit consumer goods and pollution. Đồng Xuân Market's busy trading activities have raised concerns about its pollution, which could be harmful to the health of people living in the area.

In 2003, the night market of the Đồng Xuân Market was opened on the occasion of the 2003 Southeast Asian Games, this night market is organized as a tourist attraction rather than a business place where one can buy souvenirs, handicrafts and also taste traditional foods or enjoy cultural activities such as ca trù and chèo. Performers of other traditional arts like đàn bầu or xẩm artists are also invited to demonstrate their talent in the night market. For this reason, Đồng Xuân night market is considered efficient way to preserve and propagate the values of the traditional culture of Vietnam. Since October 2004, the street in front of Đồng Xuân Market, which is also named Đồng Xuân Street (phố Đồng Xuân), is made pedestrian street every Friday, Saturday and Sunday evenings so that they can expand the scope of Dong Xuan night market, where thousands of small items can be found at a nice price.

Besides the commercial activities, Đồng Xuân Market is also a frequent destination for tourists during their visit to Hanoi, where they can find gifts or souvenirs for themselves or their family or friends.

== Image ==
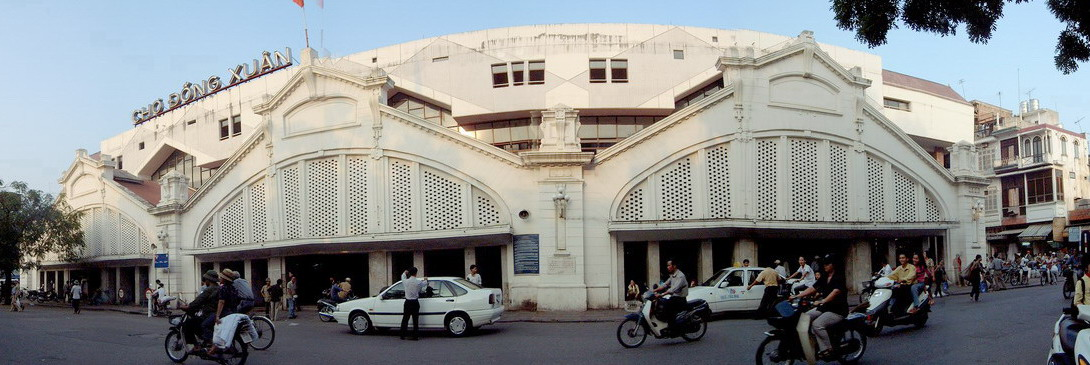
A panoramic view of Đồng Xuân Market
