= The Story of Thạch Sanh =

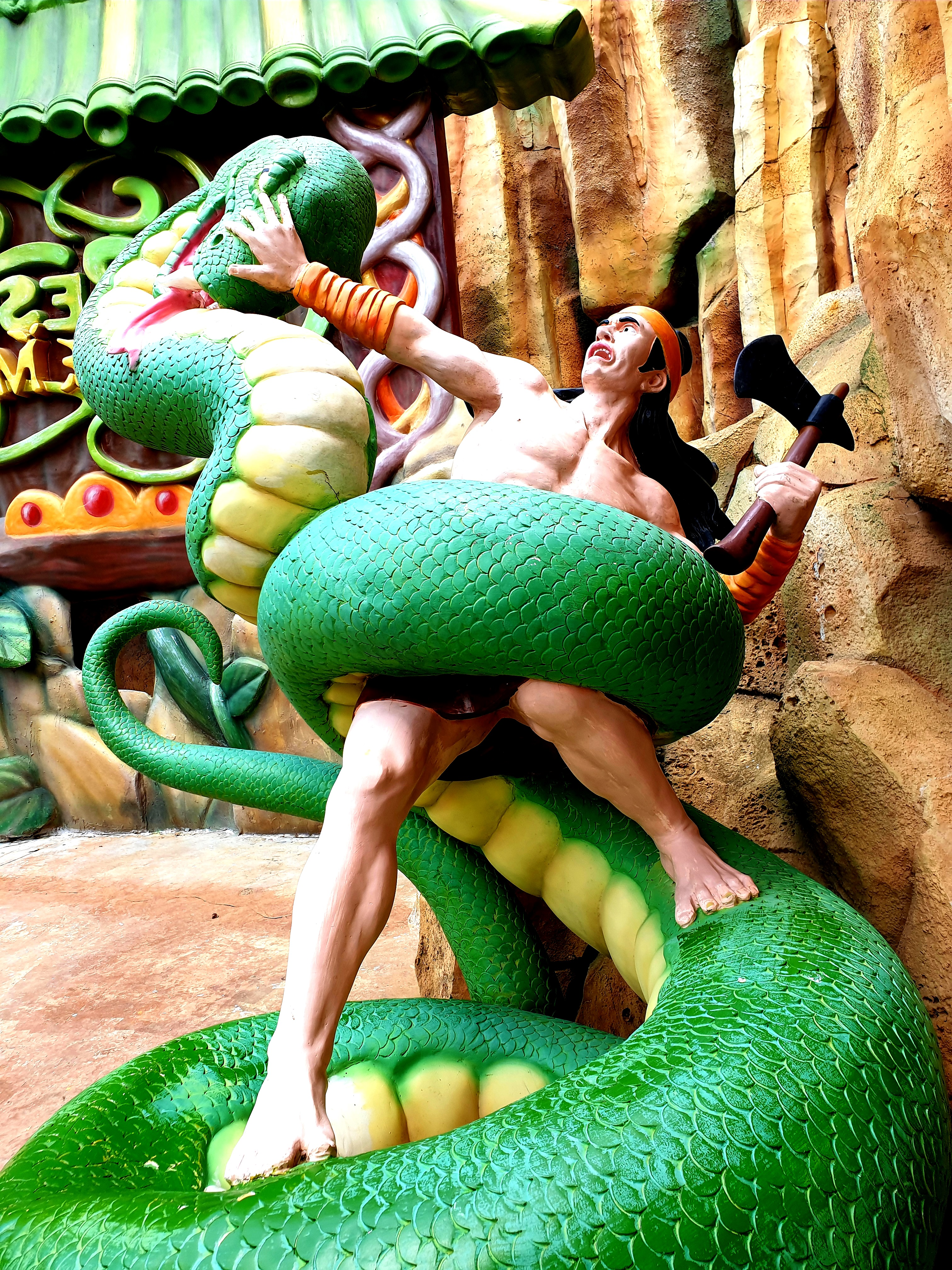
The scene where Thạch Sanh beat Chằn tinh at an amusement park in Vietnam

The Story of Thạch Sanh (Chữ Nôm: 石生新傳, Thạch Sanh tân truyện) is a late eighteenth-century Vietnamese classical novel written in vernacular chữ Nôm script and lục bát ("6-8") verse. The author is unknown. Popular elements in the story are also taken from Vietnamese mythology.

== Plot ==
Long ago in Cao Bình province lived an elderly and infertile couple. They were impoverished but kind to fellow villagers. Moved by the couple’s virtues, the Jade Emperor commanded his Crown Prince to reincarnate as their son. The husband died while the wife remained in gestation for years before she birthed a son. When the boy reached adulthood, she too died. Villagers called the orphaned young man Thạch Sanh. He lived alone in a rundown shack by the Banyan trunk, his only possession was an ax inherited from his father. Deities sent by the Jade Emperor trained him in martial arms and divine powers.

One day, a wine merchant named Lý Thông witnessed Thạch Sanh carrying a giant yoke of timber. Lý Thông wheedled Thạch Sanh to sworn brotherhood with him, inviting him to live with his family to use Thạch Sanh’s labor for his distillery. The village was terrorized by an anthropophagous, shape-shifting beast called Chằn tinh. Villagers had to erect an altar for the monster and sacrifice a human life every year. When it was Lý Thông’s turn to be sacrificed, he tricked Thạch Sanh into taking his place. However, with his ax, Thạch Sanh killed Chan Tinh, which revealed itself to be a giant anaconda. Thạch Sanh beheaded the beast and brought home its magical bow. Lý Thông and his mother, deceitful once more, convince Thạch Sanh to flee, claiming the anaconda was the King’s pet. Lý Thông then took Chan Tinh’s head to the royal’s palace, posing as the slayer, and was bestowed Admiral.

Meanwhile, the King sought a husband for his daughter. During a grand fair to select a suitor, an Eagle - another magical beast - captured the princess. Thạch Sanh, witnessing this from his Banyan trunk, wounded the Eagle with his magical bow and followed it to its cavern. The King ordered Lý Thông to rescue the princess. Lý Thông put up a lavish festival to lure Thạch Sanh to the village. Lý Thông found Thạch Sanh in the crowd and sought his help. Thạch Sanh led the royal’s troop and Lý Thông to the Eagle’s den, rescued the princess, and killed the Eagle. However, Lý Thông betrayed him by leaving him trapped in the cave.

While escaping from the Eagle’s den, Thạch Sanh also found and rescued the son of the Vua Thuỷ Tề (Water King), who had been kept captive by the Eagle for a year. In gratitude, the Water King offered Thạch Sanh treasures, but he only accepted a magical instrument. Thạch Sanh returned to his solitary life, but Chan Tinh and the Eagle’s damned spirits, seeking revenge, framed him for theft by stealing the royal’s vaulted reserve and dropped it at Thạch Sanh’s Banyan trunk, and he was imprisoned.

The princess became mute after her ordeal. However, when she heard the music Thạch Sanh played on his magical instrument from prison echoing to her palace, she was healed and asked the King to bring the musician to her. Thạch Sanh told his story, exposing Lý Thông’s treachery. The King imprisoned Lý Thông, but Thạch Sanh forgave him. Despite this, Lý Thông and his mother were struck by lightning and killed on their journey home.

Thạch Sanh married the princess, but jealous princes from vassal kingdoms attacked. Thạch Sanh used his magical instrument to pacify them, and he hosted a banquet with just one pot of rice that mystically fed their entire army. In awe of Thạch Sanh’s magic, the princes retreated. When the King died, Thạch Sanh inherited the throne and ruled wisely.

== Influence ==
The Story of Thạch Sanh is a popular artistic theme in Xẩm singing and Đông Hồ painting.

In Vietnamese vernacular proverbs, Thạch Sanh is referred to as the archetype for honesty and virtues, where as Lý Thông is referred to as the archetype for wickedness.

Vietnamese students are taught the Story of Thạch Sanh in Grade 6 Literature.
