= Phạm Thị Trân =

Tenth century Vietnamese artist, opera singer and Mandarin

Phạm Thị Trân (926–976), was a Vietnamese artist, dancer, opera singer and Mandarin during the Dinh Dynasty period.

She was originally from Hong Chau, now in Hải Dương province , and was eventually invited to the king's royal court, Dinh Tien. On the king's orders, she taught the arts to soldiers.

She was a pioneer artist as an opera singer, and is referred to as the first professional theatre artist in Vietnam. Among her innovations, she is credited as the creator of chèo, a popular theatre genre. Additionally, she is notable as the first woman to be appointed a Mandarin in Vietnam.
