= Hà Thị Cầu =

Vietnamese singer

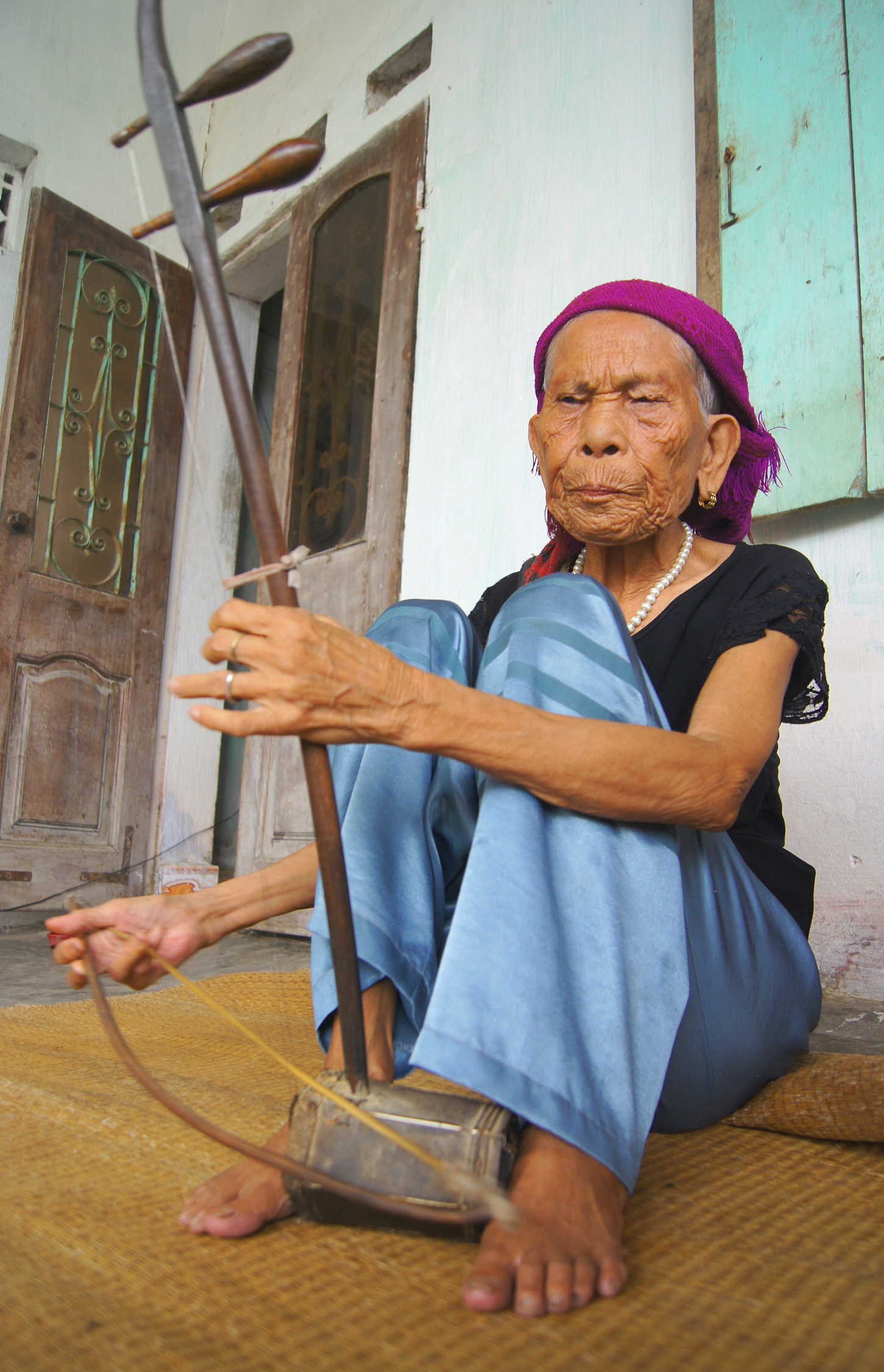
Xẩm maestro Hà Thị Cầu

Hà Thị Cầu (1928 - 3 March 2013) was a famous Vietnamese xẩm singer. Cầu was one of six traditional singers whose works were selected for study and preservation in the late 1990s.

== Early life ==
Hà Thị Cầu was born in 1928 to an extremely poor family in Nam Định province. At an early age, she followed her parents as they wandered from town to town singing for money. Xẩm lyrics and the music of her parents generation was absorbed in her heart and mind. Her performance reflected her love for her homeland and family and her passion for Xẩm singing. She didn’t know how to read and write but she remembered the lyrics of hundreds of songs.

Hà Thị Cầu was granted the honorary titles of People’s Artist and Emeritus Artist in 1993, and received VOV’s Certificate of Merit and the special prize for “Chèo artist of Ninh Bình province” at the national festival of Tuồng and Chèo singing. In 2008, she was given the Đào Tấn award for her contributions to preserving folklore art. Her death was a great loss to Xẩm music and Vietnamese folk art.

A short documentary called Xẩm Đỏ (Red Xẩm), about the life and art of Hà Thị Cầu, was made by filmmaker Lương Đình Dũng in 2012 and released in 2016.
