= Guitar phím lõm =

Vietnamese musical instrument

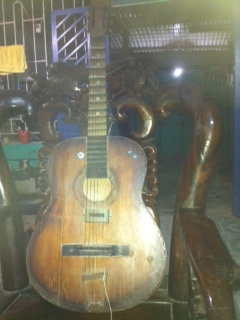
Picture of a Guitar phím lõm

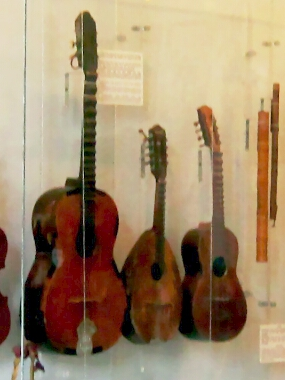
Đàn lục huyền cầm in cải lương art gallery

The đàn lục huyền cầm (chữ Hán: 彈六絃琴) (literally "lute with six strings"), or colloquially đàn ghi-ta phím lõm (literally ghi-ta "guitar," + phím "fret", + lõm "sunken"), is a scalloped Vietnamese adaptation of the French guitar.

The guitar, or ghi-ta, was adopted by Vietnamese musicians during the 19th Century. However, to adapt a western guitar to the deep pressing on the strings necessary for Vietnamese music, the fingerboard - the wood of the neck between the frets - was scooped out to ease the pressing. This carving out of the fingerboard is what gives the distinctive scalloped appearance to the six-string đàn lục huyền cầm. This form of guitar is commonly used in cải lương or "Southern Reformed Theater." In modern times, it has been included in Chầu văn music. Traditionally, acoustic guitars are used, but electric guitars are increasingly popular in modern day.

Some guitarists use artificial harmonics to imitate the sound of Đàn bầu.
