= Phách =

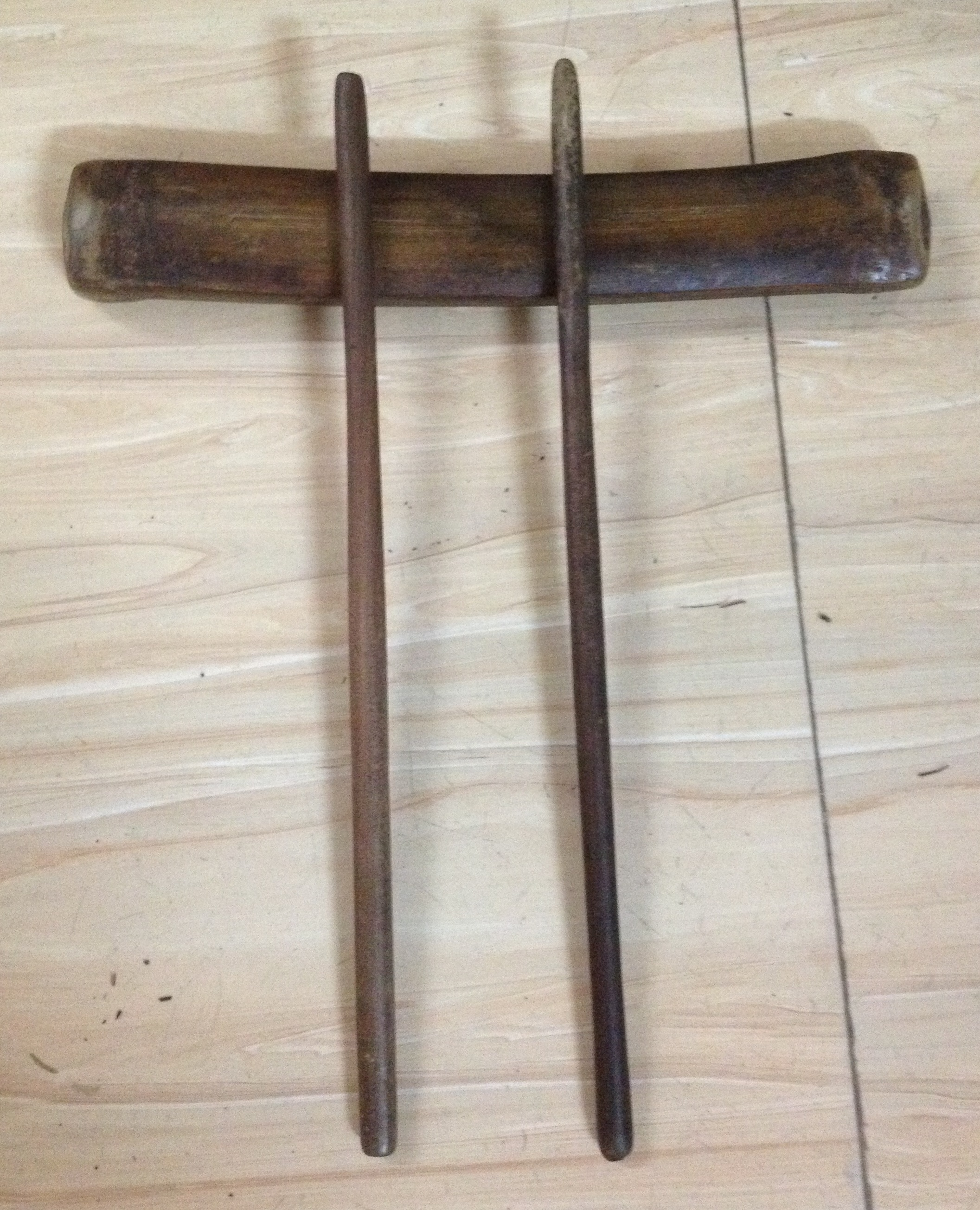
The phách of Ca trù

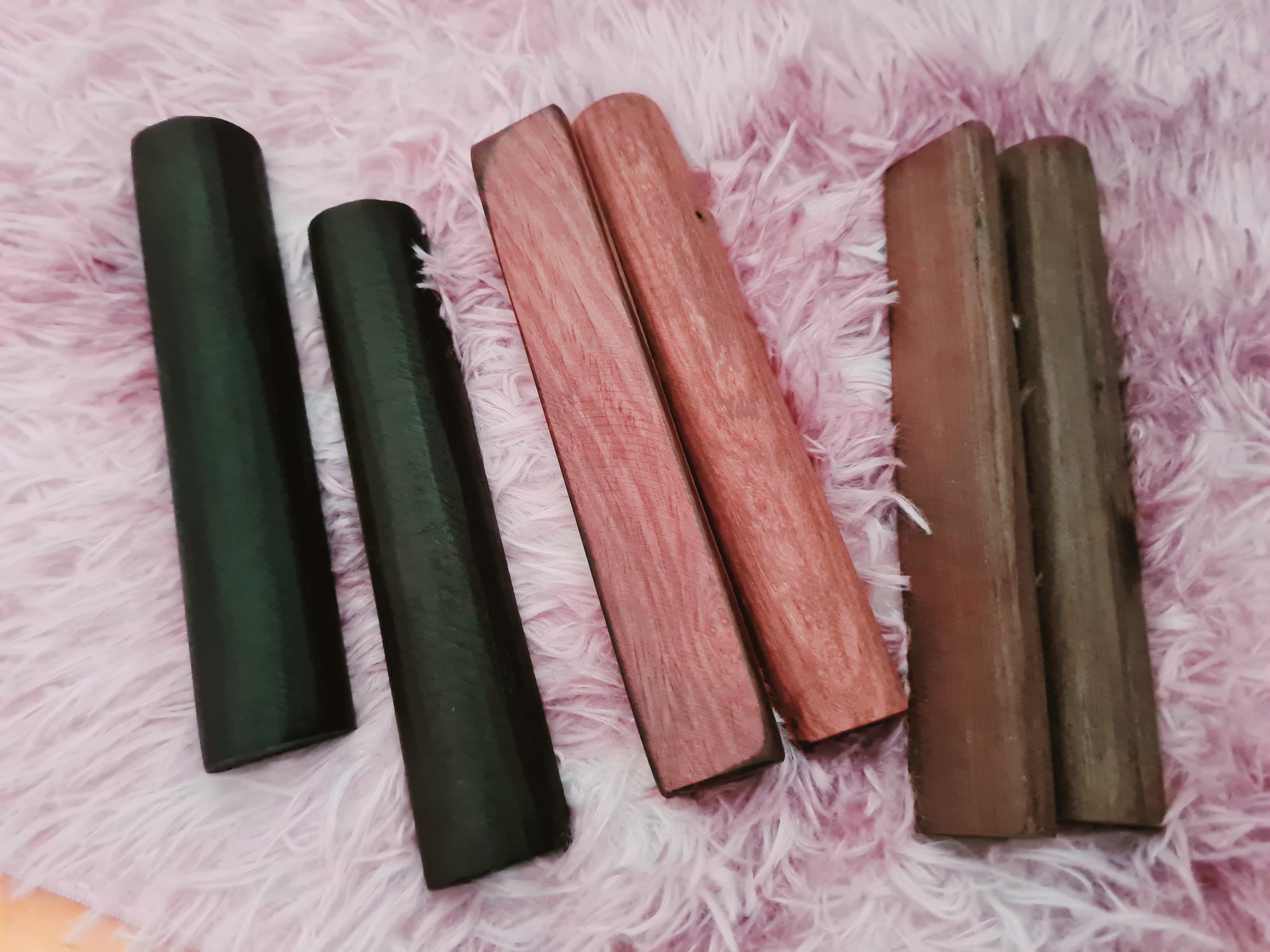
The phách (nhịp sanh) of Caodaism

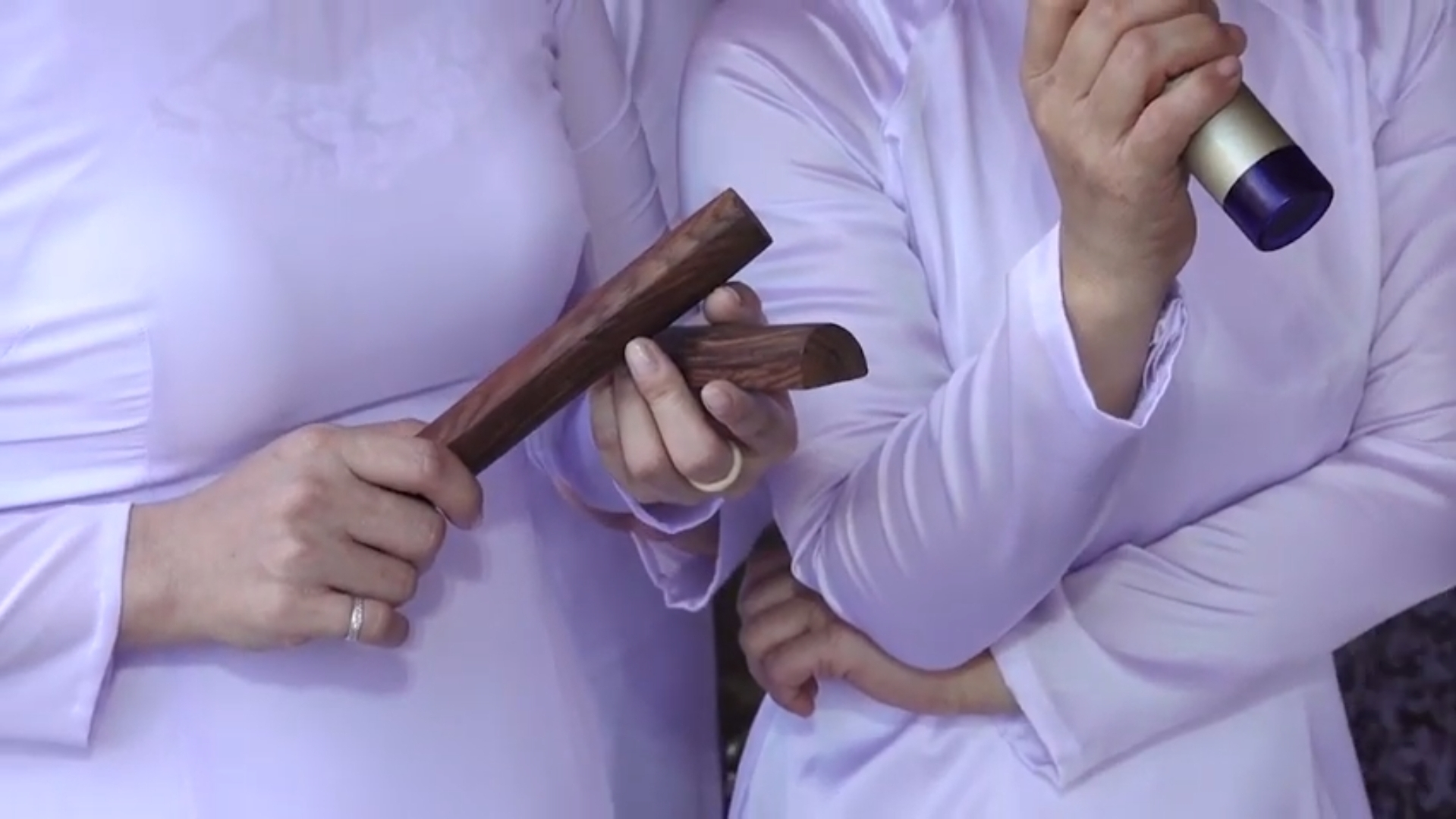
A đồng nhi of Caodaism is holding phách (nhịp sanh) to lead the rhythm of the đồng nhi orchestra

The phách (Vietnamese: [fát], Hanoi: [fájk̟])) is a type of claves. A pair has two small wooden sticks which are beaten on a small bamboo platform to serve as percussion by the female vocalist during performances of ca trù "song with clappers", in Northern Vietnam.
