= Tuồng =

Form of Vietnamese theatre

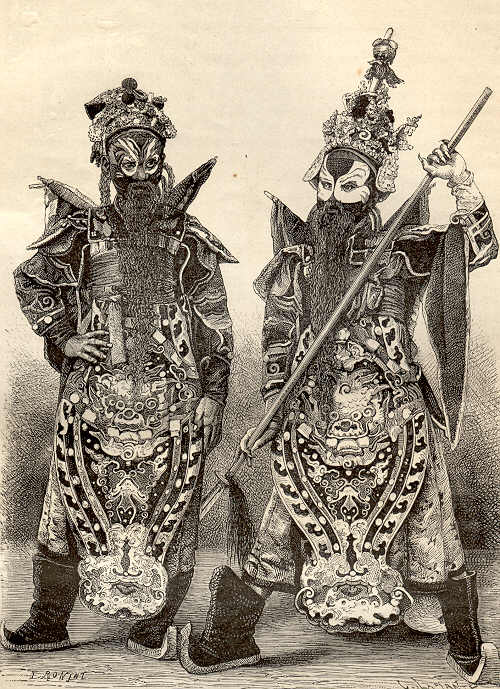
Costumes as warlords for Tuồng (Hát Bội) in Huế in 1874

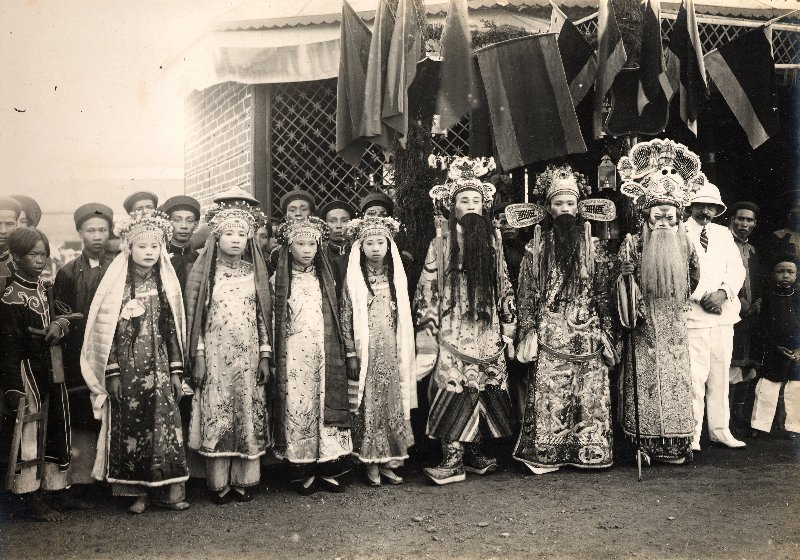
Theatre actors from Nam Dinh in 20th century Vietnam.

Hát tuồng (Vietnamese pronunciation: [háːt tûəŋ], Chữ Nôm: 咭從) or hát bội (Vietnamese pronunciation: [háːk ɓôjˀ], Chữ Nôm: 咭佩) is a form of Vietnamese theatre. Hát tuồng is often referred to as classical "Vietnamese opera" influenced by Chinese opera.

Tuồng is distinct from the older hát chèo genre of Vietnamese theatre which combines dance, song and poetry, and the more modern cải lương folk musical.

== History ==
The origin of tuồng is still unclear. It is believed that it was imported from China around the 13th century when Vietnam was warring against the Mongol Yuan Dynasty. A famous actor named Lý Nguyên Cát (Li Yuanji; Chinese: 李元吉) was imprisoned by the Vietnamese. The imperial court asked him to spread his knowledge of Chinese theatre to the children of the elite, thus explaining how tuồng had first had its beginnings in Vietnam in the royal court. Later on, it was adapted to travelling troupes who entertained commoners and peasants.

However, the first person to lay the foundations for the art of tuồng in Vietnam was Dao Duy Tu. Under the Nguyen dynasty, under which he served, tuồng reached its highest point and was favored by Nguyen kings. Many great playwrights, including Đào Tấn, also lived during this period.

Along with hát chèo, tuồng was one of the highly popular art forms for commoners until the 20th century. With the arrival of cải lương and modern theatrics, tuồng gradually lost its position.

== Storylines ==
Stories in the opera tend to be ostensibly historical and frequently focus on the rules of social decorum, and can include legends from either the history of China or Vietnam.

== Make-up ==
Tuồng employs the use of stock characters who are recognizable from their make-up and costumes, which are typically very elaborate and extravagant.

Usually, a character's personalities can be revealed through three features: the color of the face, the eyebrows, and the beard.

=== Color of the face ===
- Red: dignified, outspoken, and courageous characters.
- White: characters with a beautiful look, usually calm and good-natured.
- Blue: haughty characters - can be applied to both antagonists and protagonists.
- Green: disloyal characters.
- Golden/Metallic: immortals, fairies, supernatural characters.
- Bone white/light pink/grey: adulators.
- Peach cheeks: loyal characters.
- Black and white striped: hot-tempered characters.
- Striped lines with parts painted in red: devils and monsters.

=== Eyebrows ===
- White eyebrows: elders and fairies.
- Soft, simple eyebrows: good-natured characters.
- Long, curving eyebrows: haughty, arrogant characters.
- Straight eyebrows: hot-tempered characters.
- Short eyebrows: antagonists in general.
- Scowling eyebrows: pessimistic and gloomy characters.

=== Beard ===
- Long, green/black beard: scholar-bureaucrats.
- Long, white/grey beard: military generals.
- Red beard: foreign generals.
- Curly, black beard: hot-tempered characters.
- Anchor beard: farmers, woodsmen, and supporting characters.
- Painted beard: glamour boys.

== See also ==
- Hát chèo
- Cải lương
- Music of Vietnam
- Traditional Vietnamese dance
- Culture of Vietnam
- History of Vietnam
