= Chèo =

Vietnamese genre of musical theatre

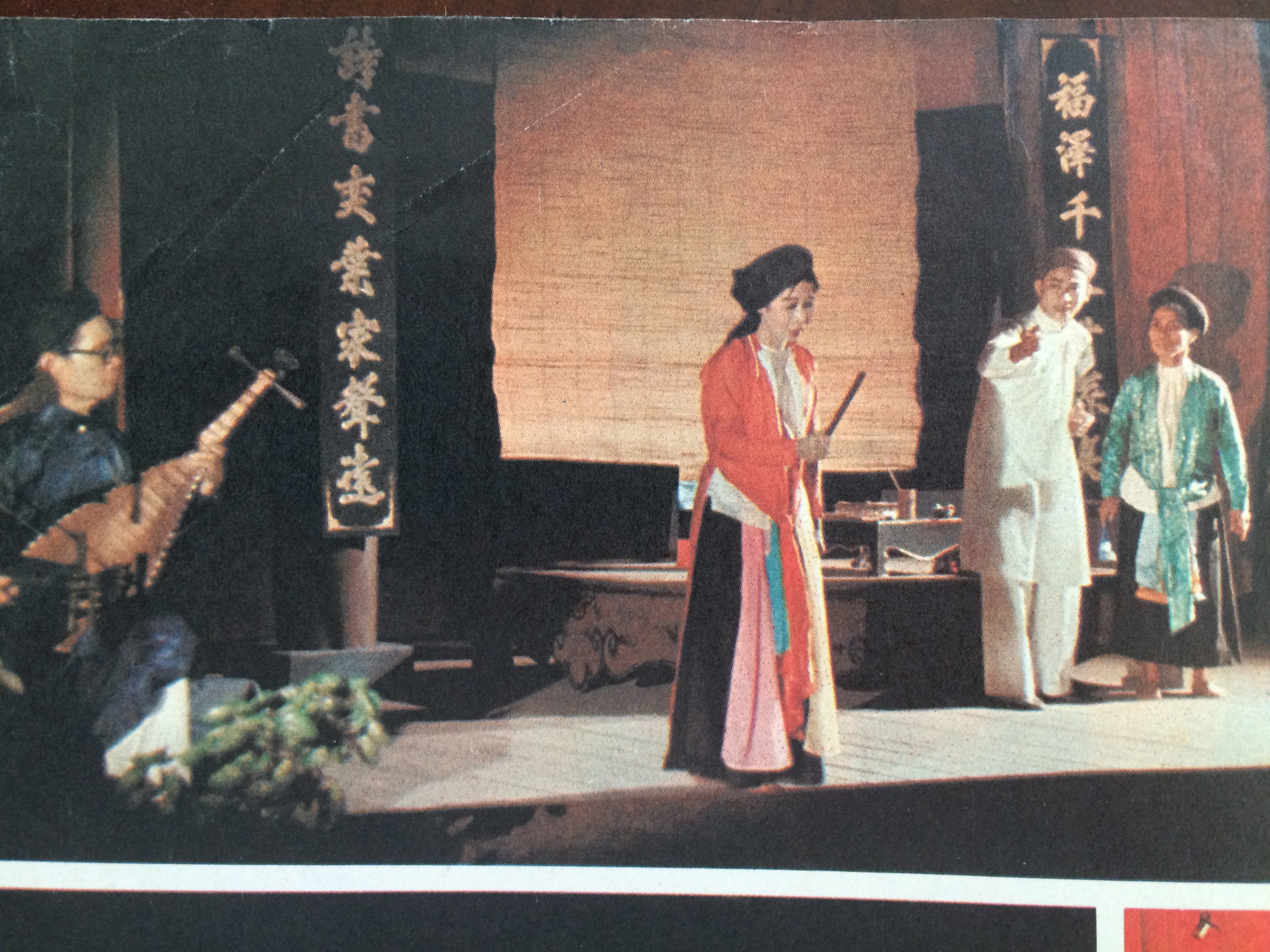
Scene from Vũ Khắc Khoan's play Quan Âm Thị Kính Chèo theater

Chèo (Vietnamese: [t͡ɕɛw˨˩], Chữ Nôm: 嘲) is a form of generally satirical musical theatre, often encompassing dance, traditionally performed by Vietnamese peasants in northern Vietnam. It is usually performed outdoors by semi-amateur touring groups, typically in a village square or the courtyard of a public building, although it is today increasingly also performed indoors and by professional performers. Chèo stage art is one of the great cultural heritage of the Vietnamese folk treasure. Chèo has been a popular art form of the Vietnamese people for many generations and has fostered the national spirit through its lyricontent.

Hát chèo's origins date to the 12th century during the Lý dynasty and has existed in its present form since roughly the 16th century. It derives from folk traditions, and was orally transmitted; unlike courtly theater traditions, it employs no scenery and sparse costumes and makeup. It involves a combination of traditional set pieces and improvisational routines appropriate to amateur theatre. Like the Commedia dell'arte, it often carries a message of satirical criticism of the existing social order. The traditional musical ensemble consisted of the đàn nguyệt, sáo, and the drum, though in modern recreations, more instruments are used.

A scene featuring hát chèo may be seen in the 2002 Vietnamese film Mê Thảo, Thời Vang Bóng (The Glorious Time in Mê Thảo Hamlet), directed by Việt Linh.

== History ==
Hoa Lư – Ninh Bình is considered as the homeland of the Chèo, and its founder, Phạm Thị Trân, was a talented dancer in the royal palace during the Đinh dynasty of the tenth century. However, Chèo officially appears from the Lý dynasty (around the 11th century), flourished in the Trần dynasty (13th century). The development of Chèo has its origins when a Mongolian soldier was captured in Vietnam in the 14th century. Chèo's performance only included speaking and reciting folk songs prior to this period but influenced by the captured soldier, Chèo now is sung. In the 15th century, Emperor Lê Thánh Tông did not allow Chèo to be performed in the royal court. Chèo was only performed by peasants as a usual musical entertainment activity up to the present-day in the villages.

Chèo derives from folk music and dance, especially parody since the tenth century. Gradually, people developed various short stories based on these parodies into the longer, completed plays. Chèo was usually written by famous Confucian scholars, for example Vũ Trinh.

From loyal area's performance only, Chèo has been expanded to the North Delta and the North Central Coast (to Nghệ An province) and the Red River delta is the cradle of Vietnamese rice civilization. Whenever the crop is harvested, they organize festivals to entertain and thank the Gods for the harvest. From the first millennium BC, ancestors performed the first Chèo in the Đình yard in their village.

== Characteristics ==
=== General features ===
Chèo belongs to the genre of drama, with ancillary music including rhythmical music, evocative music, background music, and dance music. Hát chèo's is the stage singing, it can be sung by one person or many people on chorus. The melody of the Chèo tune is very suitable for the Vietnamese natural voice language. Hát chèo's is derived from folk melodies, the lyrics of Chèo are derived from folk-literary works in the Northern Delta.

Chèo stage is an integrated art form of folk songs, folk dance and others folk art forms in the Northern Delta. It is a form of storytelling, taking the stage and actors as a means of communication with the public, and can be impromptu. Chèo has no fixed structure with acts in a drama as in the European stage, where performers are often flexible. Therefore, the length of the play depends on the inspiration of the artist or the audience's request. Conversely to the opera that forces artists to memorize each word and sing followed by the conductor, artists are allowed to freely modify and play as long as expressing the emotions of the character.

Chèo has three characteristics, namely, folk songs were written into the plays, the language (the way of using techniques of art mobilized) and the character images.

The art features consist of dramatic elements, narrative techniques, character expressions, conventions and stylistics. The language has its parts using traditional Chinese verses, stanzas, or folk songs with a very liberal, free-flowing eight-word distich metre lyrical form. Chèo also uses traditional Vietnamese poetry verses such as lục bát.

Chèo works in ensembles called as "gánh hát" or "phường chèo", and be managed by all aspects by a single person. During village festivals, summer vacation, Tet's holiday, ensembles performs from village to village, this commune to the other, serving farmers working on a square mats in the middle of the village square.

=== Content of plays ===
Unlike Tuồng that praises heroic actions of noble elites, Chèo depicts the simple rural life and praises noble qualities of man such as friendship and love. Lyrics expresses human emotions.

A number of plays originates from fairy tales and stories written in chữ Nôm, the archaic Vietnamese script. In Chèo, the good usually defeats the evil; warm-hearted, gentle students are always promoted to the mandarin and the faithful wife eventually reunites with her husband. The plays often contain elements of humor, as in "Thầy mù", "Hương câm", "Đồ điếc", "Quan Âm Thị Kính" and "Trương Viên".

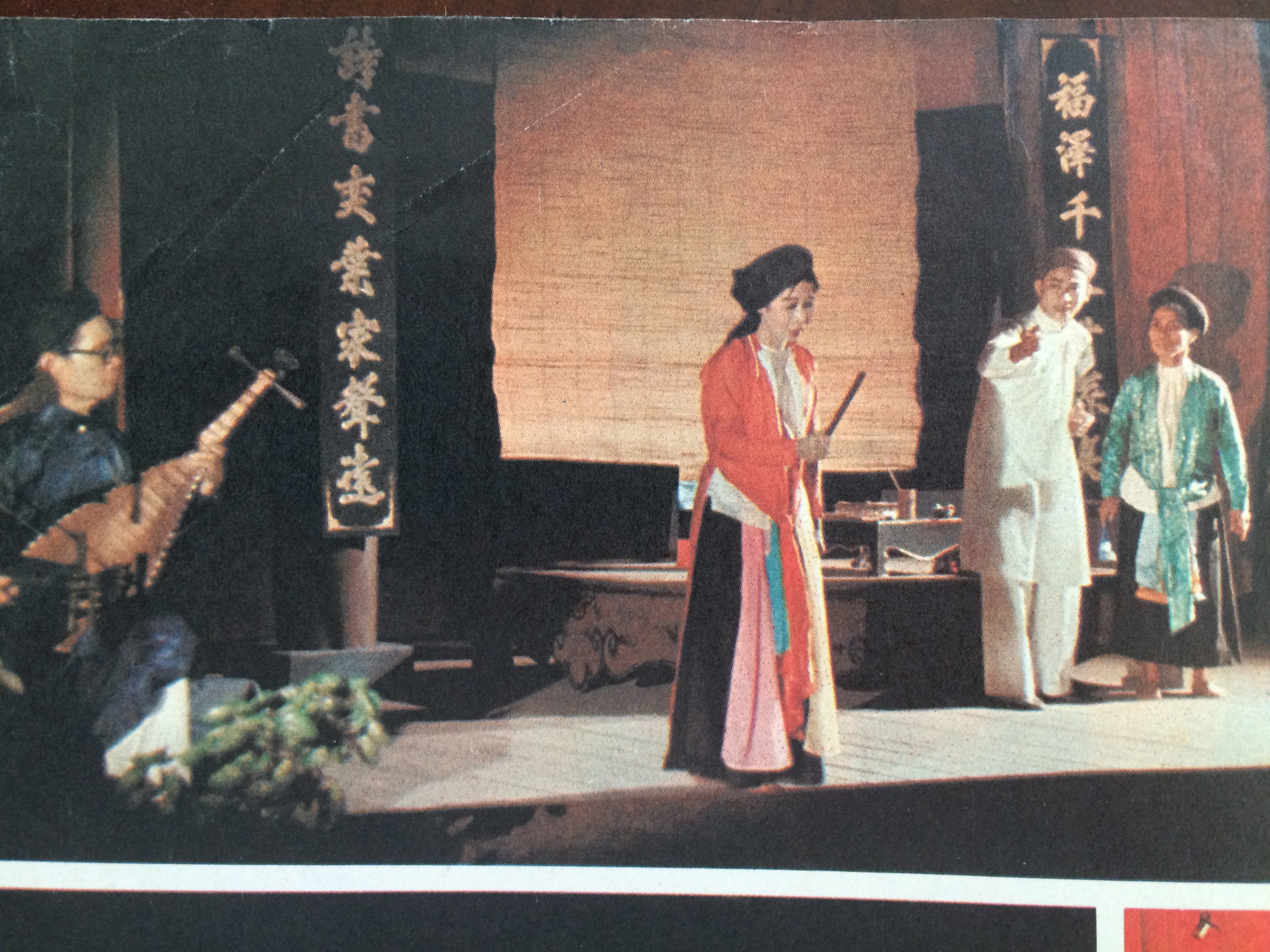
A performance of the play Quan Âm Thị Kính on December 13, 1972, at the Hát Chèo Theater in Hanoi, Vietnam. Director: Vũ Khắc Khoan.

=== Characters ===
Characters in Chèo usually represent the social norm and stereotypes. Their personality is consistent across different plays. Surrogate characters can be swapped among plays and hardly bear any names. They can be teachers, rich people, the prime minister, students, clowns, etc. However, there are also recurring characters such as Thiệt Thê, Thị Kính, Thị Mầu, and Súy Vân inheriting personalities from the colloquial conception.

"Hề chèo" (The parody guy) is a recurring character in Chèo. Hề freely ridicules, playing a role similar to that of European court clowns. Clown scenes are meant to convey the negative side of feudalism, caricaturing the king, mandarins and the bourgeoisie. There are two main types of clowns: the short-shirted and the long-shirted clown. The former usually holds a cane and the latter does not.

=== Musical instruments used ===
Chèo uses at least three string instruments including đàn nguyệt, đàn nhị, and đàn bầu, in addition to flutes, drums and cymbals. The percussion section consists of big drums, small drums, cylindrical drums, gong, bamboo and tocsin. The small drum is used to maintain the pace, for dancers and notable singers. There is a saying that goes "no drum, no Chèo", indicating the importance of the drum. In modern Chèo, instruments such as đàn tranh and sáo are added to accompany the music.

== See also ==
- Hát tuồng
- Cải lương
- Music of Vietnam
- Culture of Vietnam
- History of Vietnam
- Vietnamese theatre
