= Vọng cổ =

Vọng cổ (Vietnamese: [vâwŋmˀ ko᷉], chữ Hán: 望古, "nostalgia") is a Vietnamese song and musical structure used primarily in the cải lương theater music and nhạc tài tử chamber music of southern Vietnam. It was composed sometime between 1917 and 1919 by Cao Văn Lầu (performing name Sáu Lầu "sixth Lầu"), of Bạc Liêu Province in southern Vietnam. The song achieved great popularity and eventually its structure became the basis for numerous other songs. The tune is essentially melancholy in character and is sung using Vietnamese modal inflections.

== History ==
The term vọng cổ is used to mean:

1. the particular mode, equivalent to the oán nuance of the nam mode;
2. the original song Dạ cổ hoài lang, by Cao Văn Lầu from around 1919
3. any piece in the vọng cổ mode which employs the pitches of the original vọng cổ song as structural cadential points.
