= Cải lương =

Vietnamese form of modern folk opera

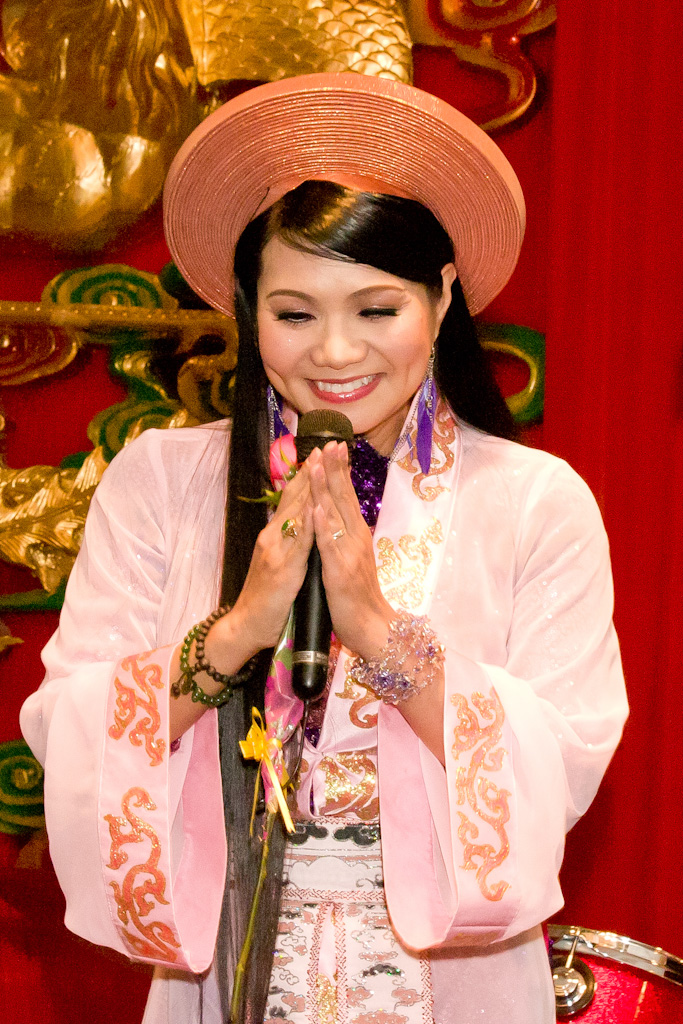
A noted cải lương singer, Ngọc Huyền

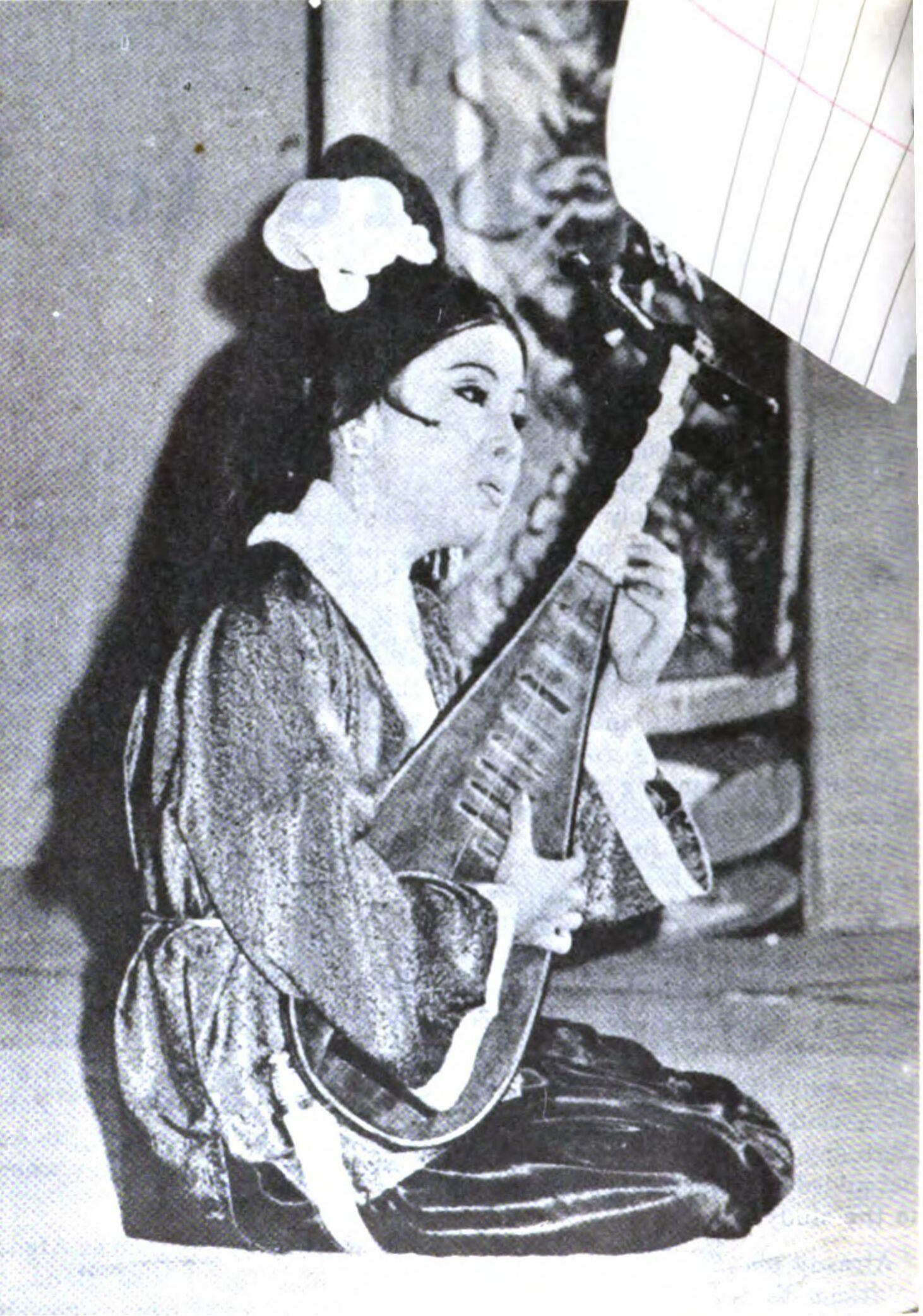
Popular artist Mộng Tuyền performs the leading role in a Cải lương Presentation.

Tuồng cải lương (Vietnamese: [tûəŋ ka᷉ːj lɨəŋ], Hán-Nôm: 傱改良) often referred to as Cải lương (Chữ Hán: 改良), roughly "reformed theater") is a form of modern folk opera in Vietnam. It blends southern Vietnamese folk songs, classical music, hát tuồng (a classical theatre form based on Chinese opera), and modern spoken drama.

== History and description ==
Xử án Bàng Quý Phi, performed by the Phước Cương troupe, c. 1928

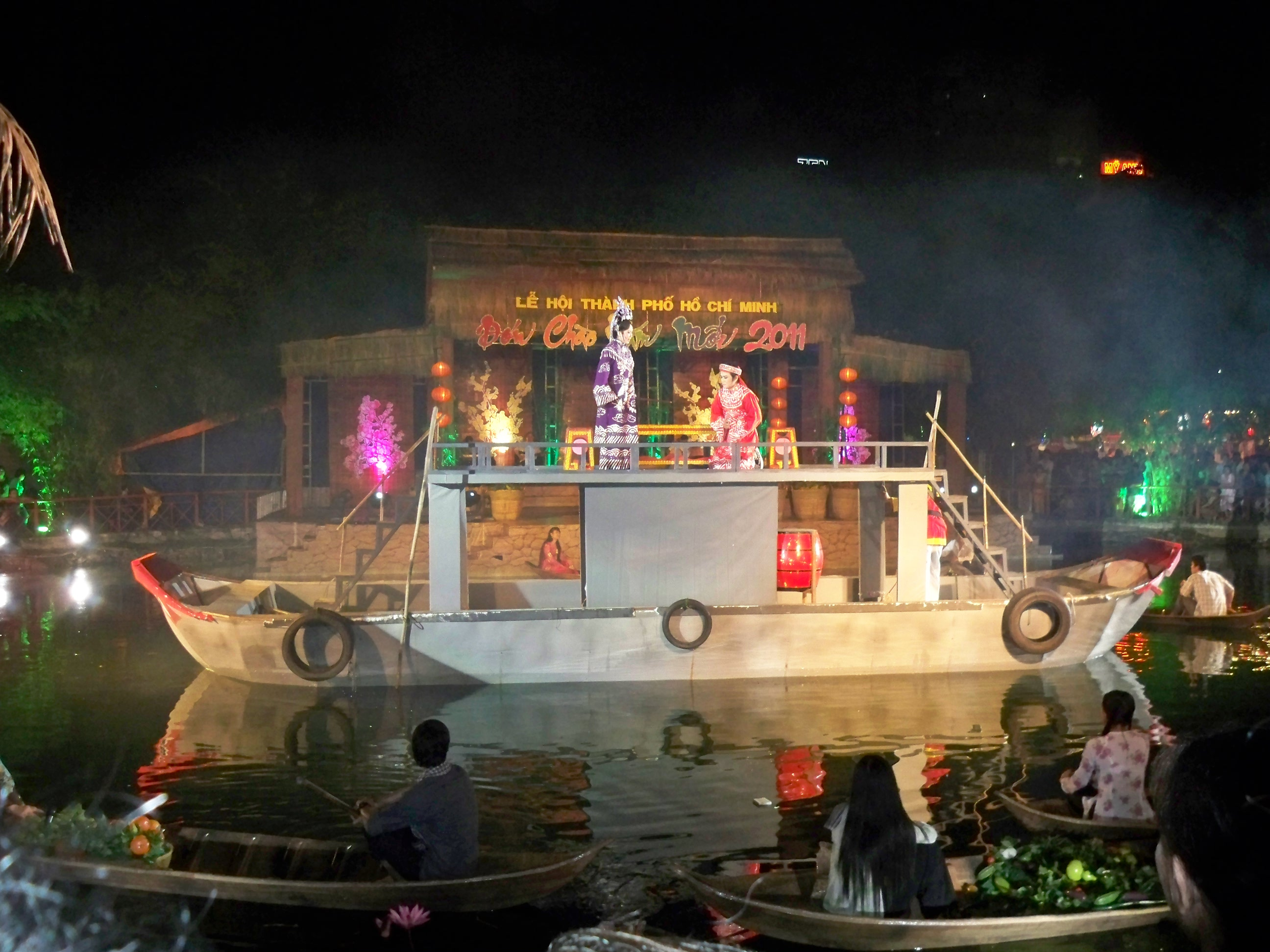
The scene of Tự Đức offering the whip in Cải lương

Cải lương originated in Southern Vietnam in the early 20th century and blossomed in the 1930s as a theatre of the middle class during the country's French colonial period. Cải lương is now promoted as a national theatrical form. Unlike the other folk forms, it continued to prove popular with the masses as late as the 1970s and the 1980s especially with a "golden age" of "Cải lương" videos in the 1990s, although it is now in decline.

Cải lương can be compared to a sort of play with the added aspect of Vọng cổ. This term literally means "nostalgia for the past", it is a special type of singing with the background music often being the đàn tranh zither or the đàn ghi-ta (Vietnamized guitar). In a typical cải lương play, the actresses and actors would use a combination of regular spoken dialogue and vọng cổ to express their thoughts and emotions.

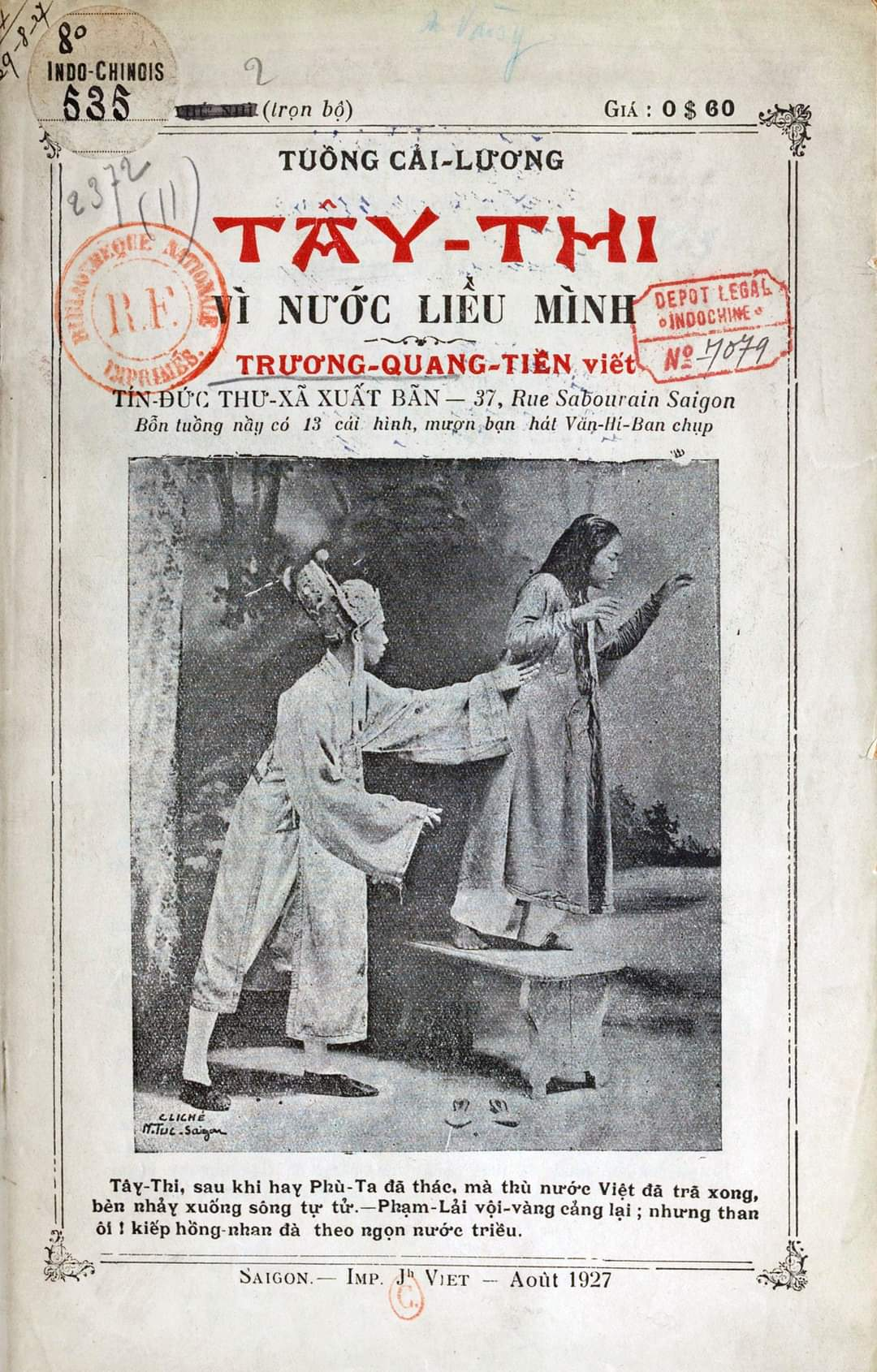
Promotional poster for the play Tây Thi in Cải lương

Cải lương normally highlights/praises traditional Vietnamese moral values. There are mainly two genres of cải lương: ancient stories (tuồng cổ) and societal (xã hội).

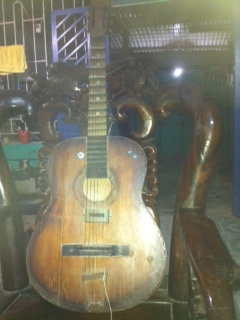
The Guitar phím lõm – instrument used for Cải lương

The societal genre (cải lương xã hội) consists of stories about modern Vietnamese society. The plots deal with a romantic love story blended with family or social relationships. The stories also explore cultural norms, social norms, and other aspects of Vietnamese society, e.g. Đời Cô Lựu, Tô Ánh Nguyệt. This genre can be somehow described as tragedy, but with a happy ending. However, a few societal plays such as "Ra Giêng Anh Cưới Em" are comedic and light-hearted.

In the ancient stories, the actor/actress dresses in an old fashioned costume. The plot is based on a tale, legend or historical story of the feudal system, where kings and warriors still existed. For example, Bên Cầu Dệt Lụa, Lục Vân Tiên, Tiếng Trống Mê Linh etc. Many plots come from Chinese historic or ancient legends. Lương Sơn Bá-Chúc Anh Đài is based on the Chinese legend of butterfly lovers. In ancient stories, Hồ Quảng, a genre of Chinese opera may be mixed. Hence, some ancient stories may be called Cải lương Hồ Quảng, which is more like a musical. In addition to regular speech, ca cải lương, and vọng cổ, several melodies are incorporated into the play. These melodies are reused through different plays, however the words are changed to fit the context of the plays. Ancient stories can be characterized by beautiful, elaborate costumes comprising beautiful and colourful dress pieces; large, beautiful glittery hairpieces; elaborate warrior armour; and elaborate warrior head pieces.

== Notable singers ==
=== Before 1975 ===
- Tám Danh (1901–1976)
- Ba Du (1904–1980)
- Năm Phỉ (1906–1954)
- Năm Châu (1906–1977)
- Ba Vân (1908–1988)
- Phùng Há (1911–2009)
- Tư Sạng (1911–1955)
- Bảy Nam (1913–2004)
- Út Trà Ôn (1919–2001)
- Lê Thanh Trí (1924–2002)
- Viễn Châu (1924–2016)
- Kim Chưởng (1926–2014)
- Văn Chung (1928–2018)
- Hữu Phước (1932–1997)
- Phi Hùng (born 1932)
- Thành Được (1934–2023)
- Văn Hường (1934–2023)
- Tùng Lâm (born 1934)
- Út Bạch Lan (1935–2016)
- Hùng Cường (1936–1996)
- Thanh Hương (1936–1974)
- Kim Cương (born 1937)
- Nam Hùng (1937–2020)
- Minh Cảnh (born 1938)
- Tấn Tài (1938–2011)
- Ngọc Nuôi (1939–2002)
- Út Hiền (1940–1986)
- Diệp Lang (1941–2023)
- Dũng Thanh Lâm (1942–2004)
- Ngọc Hương (1942–2017)
- Thanh Nga (1942–1978)
- Phương Quang (1942–2018)
- Thanh Thanh Hoa (1943–2009)
- Thanh Sang (1943–2017)
- Kim Ngọc (1944–2011)
- Minh Phụng (1944–2008)
- Hồng Nga (born 1945)
- Bach Tuyet (born 1945)
- Ngọc Giàu (born 1945)
- Diệu Hiền (born 1945)
- Phương Bình (born 1947)
- Phượng Liên (born 1947)
- Thanh Nguyệt (born 1947)
- Mộng Tuyền (born 1947)
- Bo Bo Hoàng (born 1947)
- Thanh Tòng (1948–2016)
- Lệ Thủy (born 1948)
- Thanh Tuấn (born 1948)
- Minh Vương (born 1949)
- Bảo Quốc (born 1949)
- Mỹ Châu (born 1950)
- Bạch Lê (born 1951)
- Chí Tâm (born 1952)
- Giang Châu (1952–2019)
- Bích Hạnh (born 1953)
- Thanh Kim Huệ (1954–2021)
- Kim Thủy (1956–2021)

=== After 1975 ===
- Thoại Miêu (born 1953)
- Hương Lan (born 1956)
- Phượng Mai (born 1956)
- Tài Linh (born 1956)
- Châu Thanh (born 1957)
- Lương Tuấn (1957–2008)
- Vũ Linh (1958–2023)
- Linh Tuấn (born 1959)
- Phương Hồng Thủy (born 1960)
- Thanh Hằng (born 1962)
- Linh Tâm (born 1962)
- Thanh Thanh Tâm (born 1963)
- Vân Hà (born 1964)
- Kim Tử Long (born 1966)
- Phượng Loan (born 1966)
- Phượng Hằng (born 1967)
- Thảo Nguyên (1967–2024)
- Thoại Mỹ (born 1969)
- Cẩm Tiên (born 1970)
- Ngọc Huyền (born 1970)
- Phi Nhung (1970–2021)
- Mạnh Quỳnh (born 1971)
- Vũ Luân (born 1972)
- Thanh Ngân (born 1972)
- Trọng Phúc (born 1972)
- Kim Tiểu Long (born 1974)
- Hương Thủy (born 1974)
- Tú Sương (born 1977)
- Trinh Trinh (born 1977)
- Quế Trân (born 1981)
- Lê Thanh Thảo
- Tấn Giao
- Chí Linh
- Thanh Huyền

== See also ==
- Music of Vietnam
- Cao Văn Lầu songwriter
  - Dạ cổ hoài lang ("Night song of the missing husband", 1919)
  - Vọng cổ ("Nostalgia")
- Cải lương Chung Vô Diệm
