= Traditional Vietnamese musical instruments =

Family of instruments

Traditional Vietnamese musical instruments are the musical instruments used in the traditional and classical musics of Vietnam. They comprise a wide range of string, wind, and percussion instruments, used by both the Viet (Kinh) majority as well as the nation's ethnic minorities.

== Strings ==
=== Plucked ===
- Đàn bầu - monochord zither: often tuned C3, though tuning varies
- Đàn đáy - long-necked three-stringed lute with trapezoidal body: tuned G3 C4
- Đàn nguyệt (also called nguyệt cầm, đàn kìm or Quân tử cầm) - moon-shaped two-string lute: no fixed tuning; strings are tuned a 4th, 5th, or 7th (minor), derived from the Chinese yueqin
- Đàn sến - two-string lute derived from the Chinese meihuaqin
- Đàn tam - fretless lute derived from the Chinese sanxian with snakeskin-covered body and three strings: tuned F3 C4 F4
- Đàn tranh - long zither derived from the Chinese guzheng
- Đàn tỳ bà - pear-shaped lute with four strings derived from the Chinese pipa; tuned C4 F4 G4 C5
- Đàn tứ (also called đàn đoản): short-necked round-bodied lute derived from the Chinese yueqin or, beginning in the 20th century, a square-shaped, flat-backed, 4-string lute with short neck, tuned C3 G3 D4 A4
- Guitar phím lõm (also called lục huyền cầm, ghi-ta phím lõm, or Đàn ghita) - "Vietnamized" acoustic or electric 5-string guitar with scalloped fretboard; used primarily in cải lương: tuned C3 F3 C4 G4 C5
- Đàn tính - long-necked lute with a gourd body and two or three silk strings derived from the Chinese Zhuang tianqin (天琴); used by the Tay, Nung, and Thai ethnic groups
- Bro - fretted zither with a body made of bamboo and a gourd resonator; used by minority ethnic groups in the Central Highlands
- Goong - tube zither with a bamboo body; used by minority ethnic groups in the Central Highlands
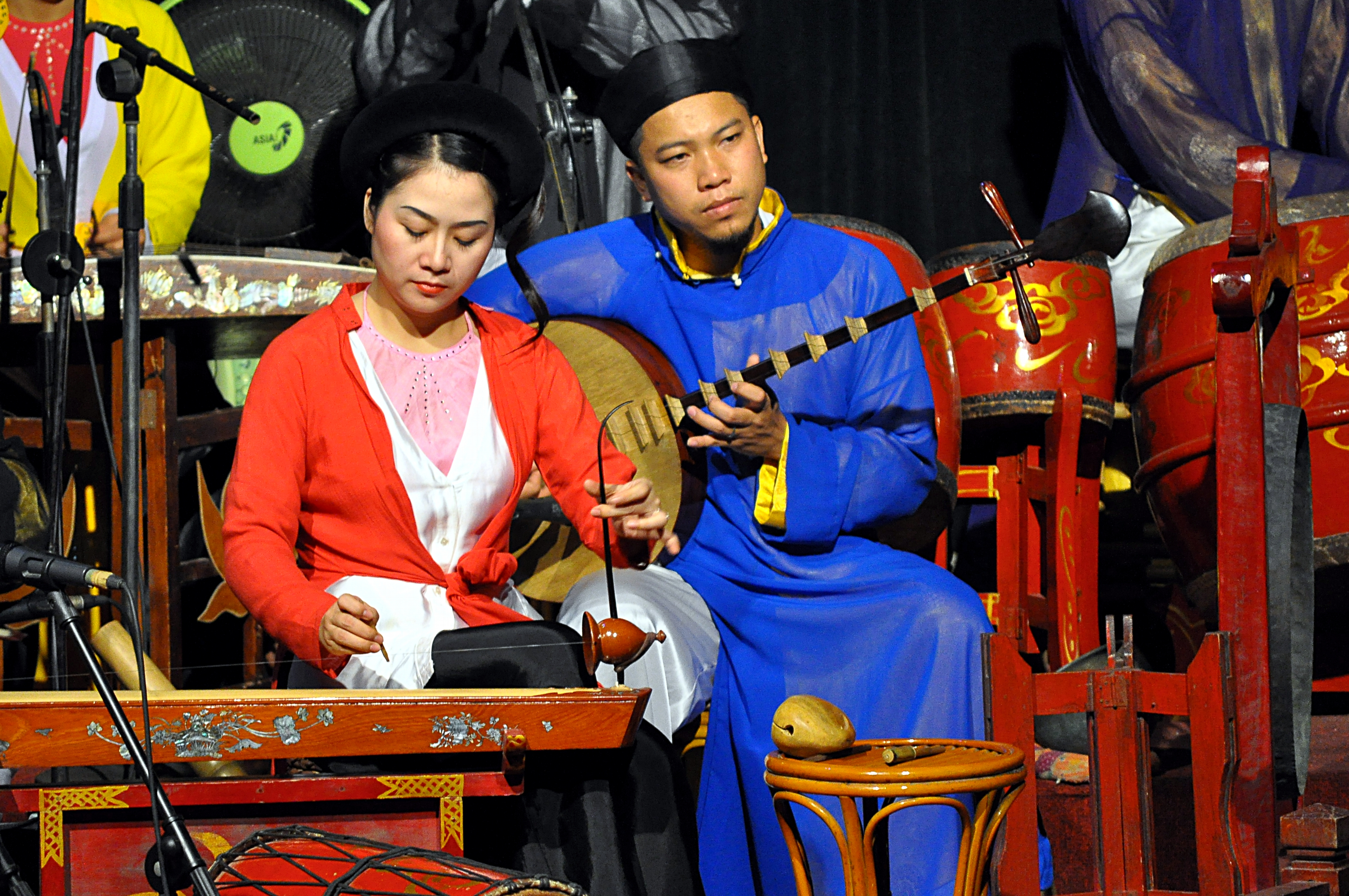
A woman playing the đàn bầu.

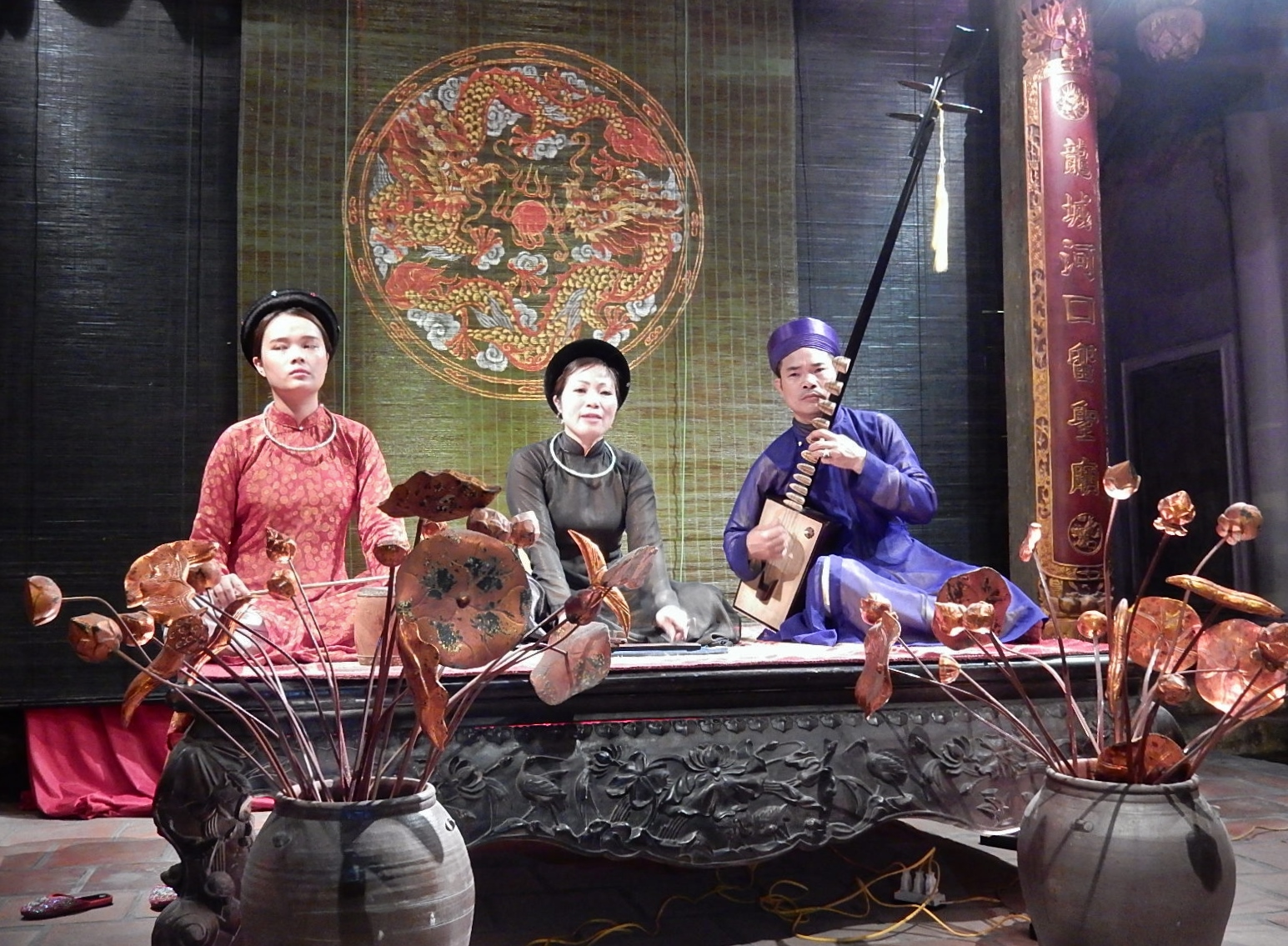
Man on the right is playing the đàn đáy which is an important part of ca trù

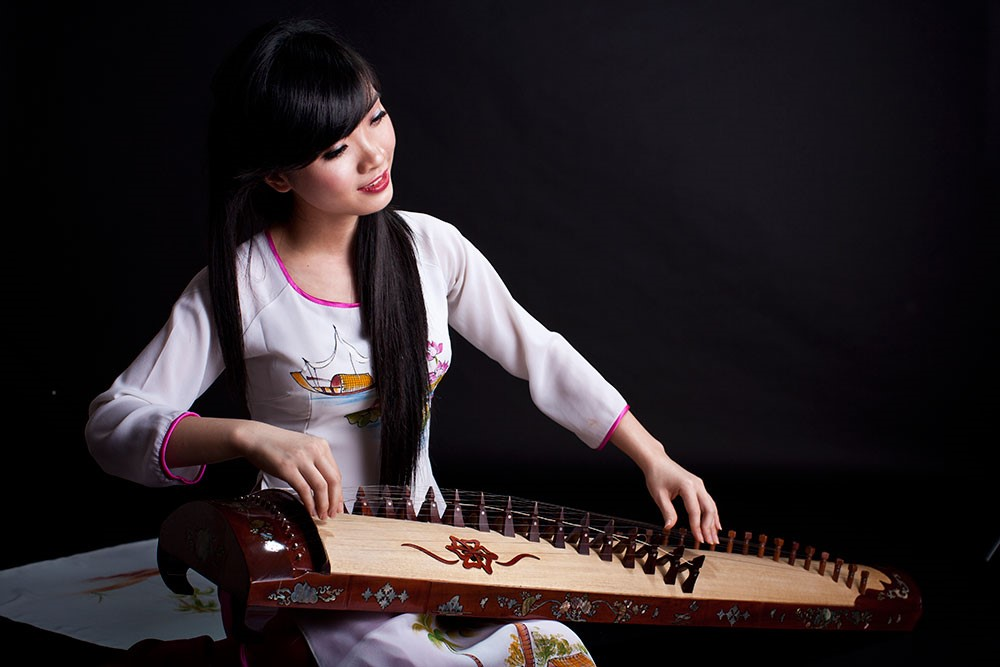
A lady playing the đàn tranh.

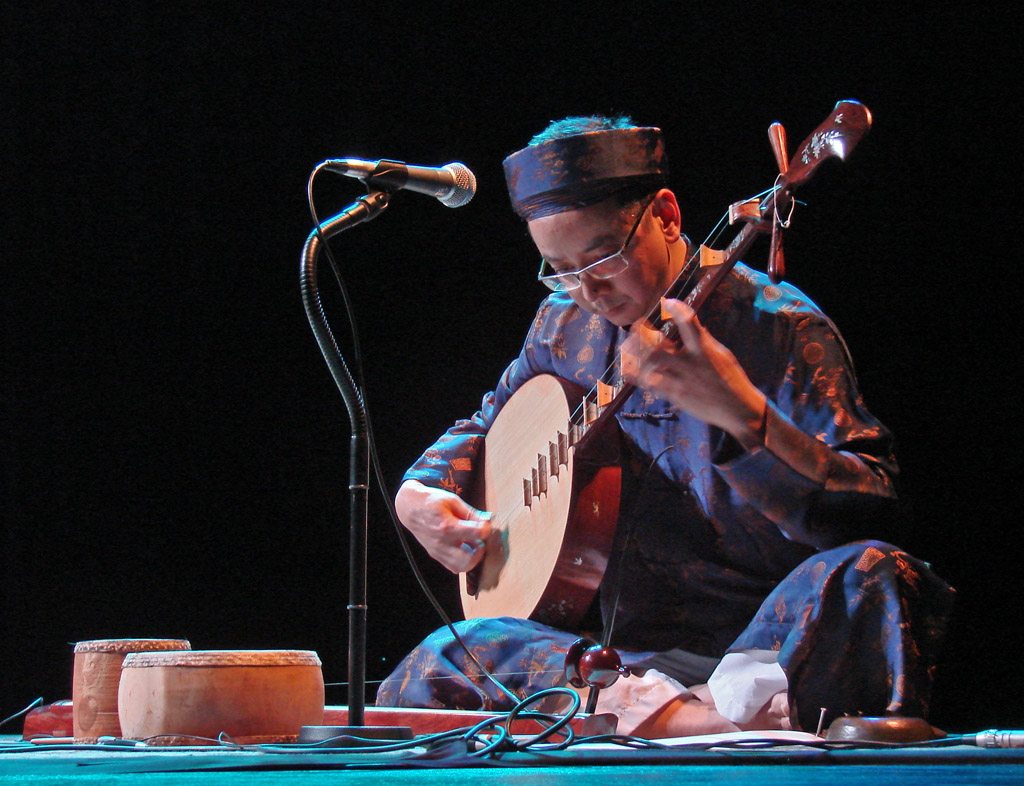
Man is playing the đàn nguyệt.

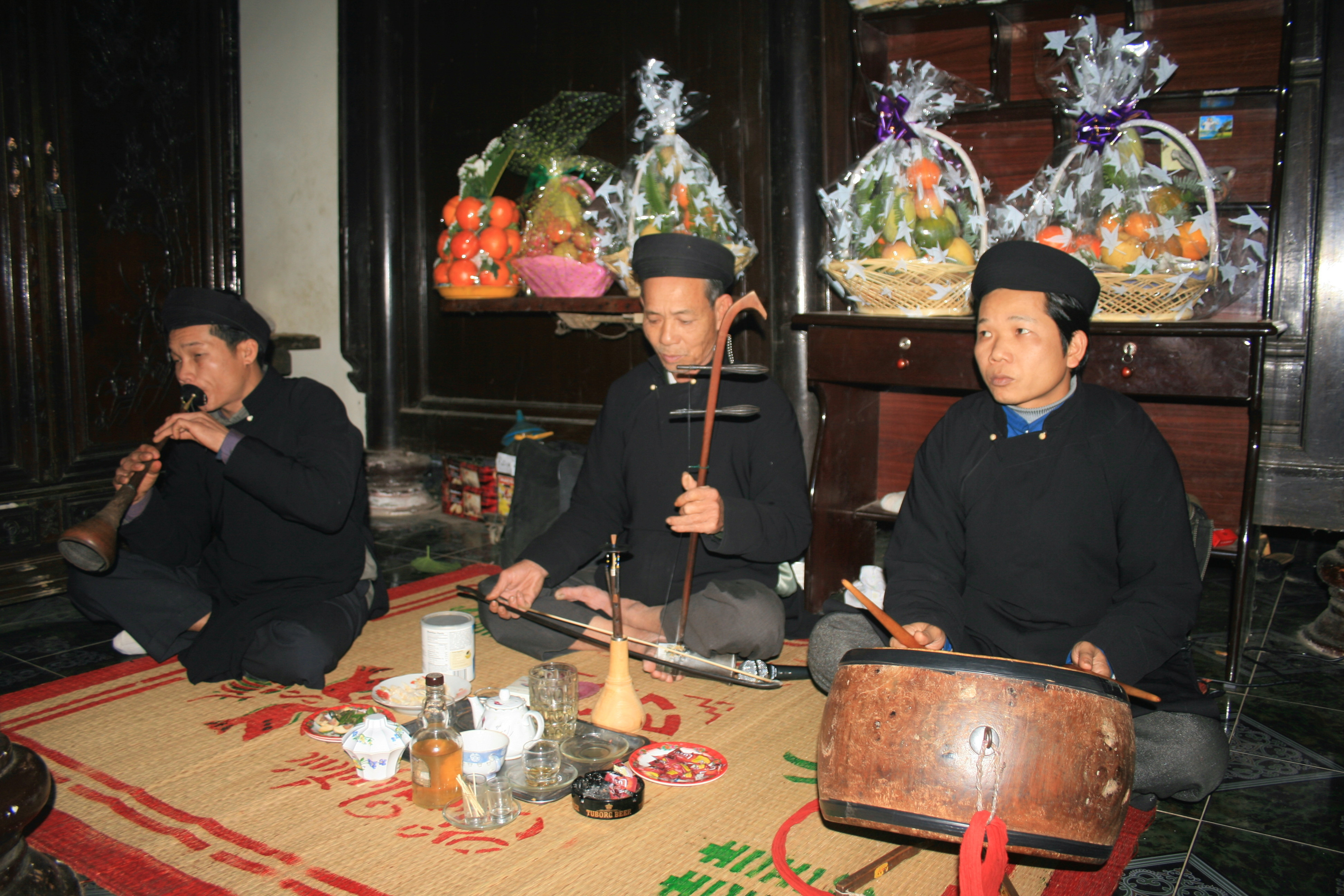
The man in the centre is playing the đàn nhị.

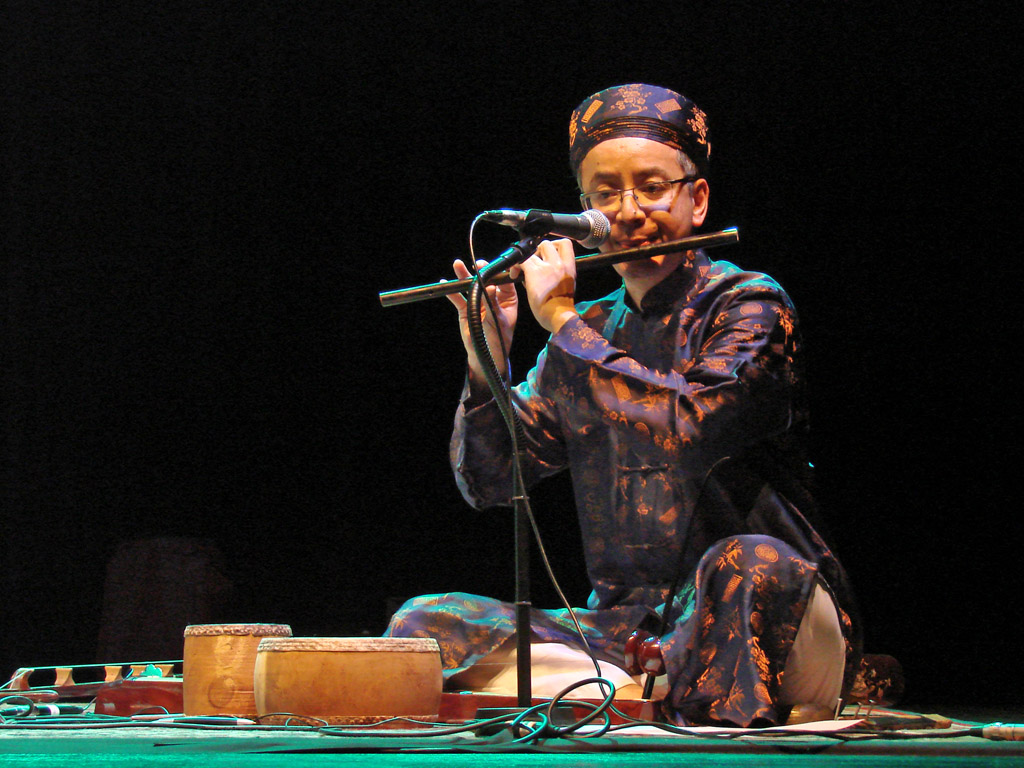
The man is playing the sáo.

=== Bowed ===
- Đàn gáo - two-stringed vertical violin with coconut resonator derived from the Chinese yehu
- Đàn hồ - two-stringed vertical violin with wooden resonator; hồ derived from the Chinese hu, as in huqin
- Đàn nhị - two-stringed vertical violin derived from the Chinese erhu
- K'ni (also spelled k'ny or k'ný) - bowed monochord; played by the Jarai people of the Central Highland

=== Struck ===
- Đàn tam thập lục - hammered dulcimer with 36 metal strings derived from the Chinese yangqin
- Đàn t'rưng: Highland Central bamboo xylophone.

== Wind ==
=== Flutes ===
- Sáo (also called sáo trúc) - transverse flute made of bamboo or hardwood

=== Oboes ===
- Kèn - class of double reed instruments similar to the oboe and the Indian shehnai
  - Kèn bầu - conical oboe with gourd-shaped wooden bell
  - Kèn đám ma - conical oboe with metal bell; used for funeral music in northern Vietnam

=== Clarinets ===
- Bi doi - double clarinet similar to the Middle Eastern mijwiz; used in courtship context mainly within the Mường people.

=== Free reed mouth organs ===
- Đing nǎm - free-reed mouth organ with gourd body and bamboo pipes; played by Highland people
- M'buot - free-reed mouth organ with gourd body and bamboo pipes; played by upland minorities
- Khèn - Vietnamese equivalent to the Khaen from Laos, Thailand and Cambodia.

=== Horns ===
- Púa - valveless brass trumpet
- Ốc ("snail") - conch trumpet
- T'dep - Buffalo horn

== Percussion ==
=== Drums ===
- Trống - drum played with sticks
  - Trống cái - bass drum
  - Trống chầu or trống đế - the largest of the set of drums used in Hát tuồng.
  - Trống cơm - rice drum
  - Dong Son drum (also called Trống Đồng) - bronze drum played by the Dong Son culture in ancient times
- Nruas tuag (also called Ư chua - drum used by the H'mong ethnic group for funeral music

=== Tuned percussion ===
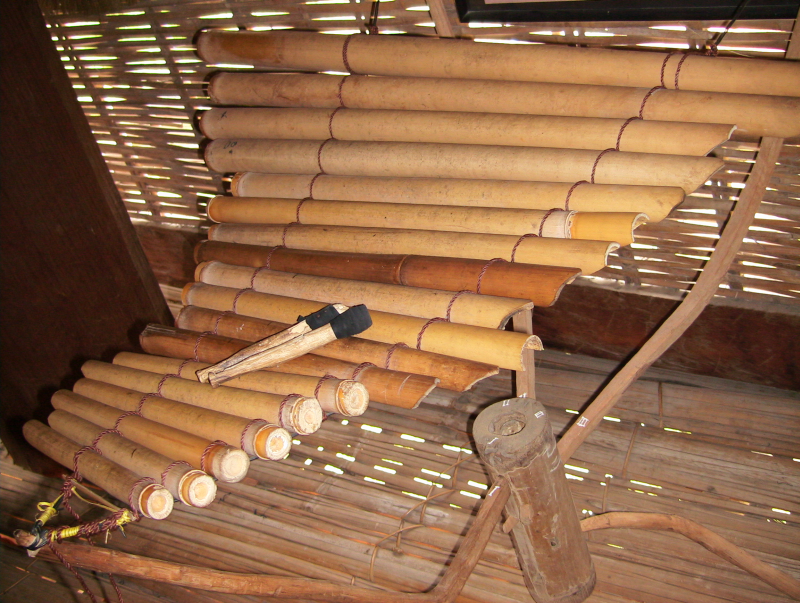
A t'rưng of the E De people

- Biên khánh - a set of L-shaped flat stone chimes used in ancient court music; derived from the Chinese bianqing
- Cồng chiêng - tuned gong (comes in both flat and knobbed varieties)
- Tam âm la - set of three small, high-pitched flat gongs in a frame; used primarily in nhã nhạc music
- T'rưng - bamboo xylophone
- Đàn đá - lithophone, commonly having 9+ stone bars, 65–102 cm (26–40 in) in length. It is believed the instrument dates back to 1000 BC. Also called Goong Lú (M'nong people), Kologolo (M'nong people), Gôông Luk (Mạ people).

=== Untuned percussion ===
- Bộ gõ - castanets
- Chun mo - metal woodblock
- Phách - clapper made from bamboo or hardwood
- Sênh tiền - coin clapper
- Sanh sua - clapper
- Song loan - woodblock

== Other ==
- Đàn môi - jaw harp
- Klông pút - Bamboo tube xylophone; hands are clapped near ends of tubes to produce musical tones
- Đàn tre ("bamboo instrument") - A hybrid form of the Vietnamese plucked string instrument, similar to a Đàn tính, called a Đàn tre, was created by Nguyễn Minh Tâm, who escaped from Vietnam in 1982 and ultimately settled in Australia. The instrument has twenty-three 800 mm (31 in)-long wire strings attached to a bamboo tube with a metal hose-clamp around the top rim. A 4 litres (0.88 imp gal; 1.1 US gal), rectangular olive oil tin, which acts as a resonator, is clamped to the base of the tube. The instrument is capable of playing both Vietnamese and Western music. The instrument can be seen and recordings of it being played by its creator can be heard at the National Museum of Australia.
- Kyey se - Vietnamese bell

== See also ==
- Music of Vietnam
- Space of Gong culture in the Central Highlands of Vietnam
