= Elegant music =

Elegant music may refer to:

- Gagaku, a type of court music from Japan
- Nhã nhạc, a type of court music from Vietnam
- Yayue, a type of court music from China
