= Đàn sến =

Vietnamese musical instrument

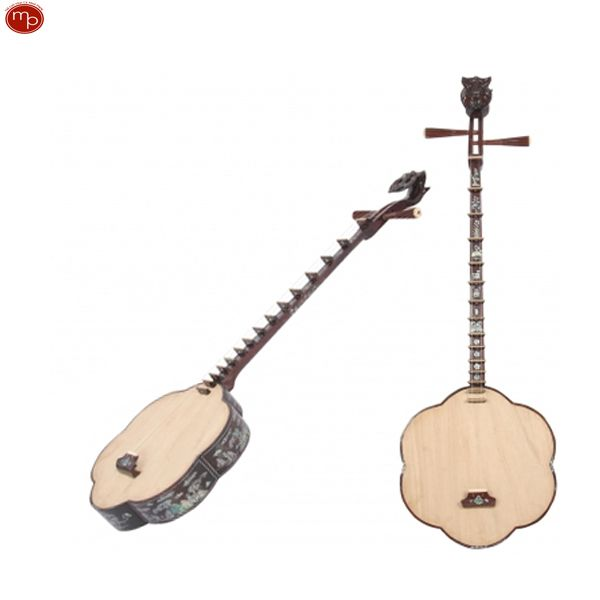
- Classification: String
- Hornbostel–Sachs classification: 321.321
- Developed: Vietnam

Related instruments
- Đàn nguyệt, Đàn tỳ bà, Đàn tam

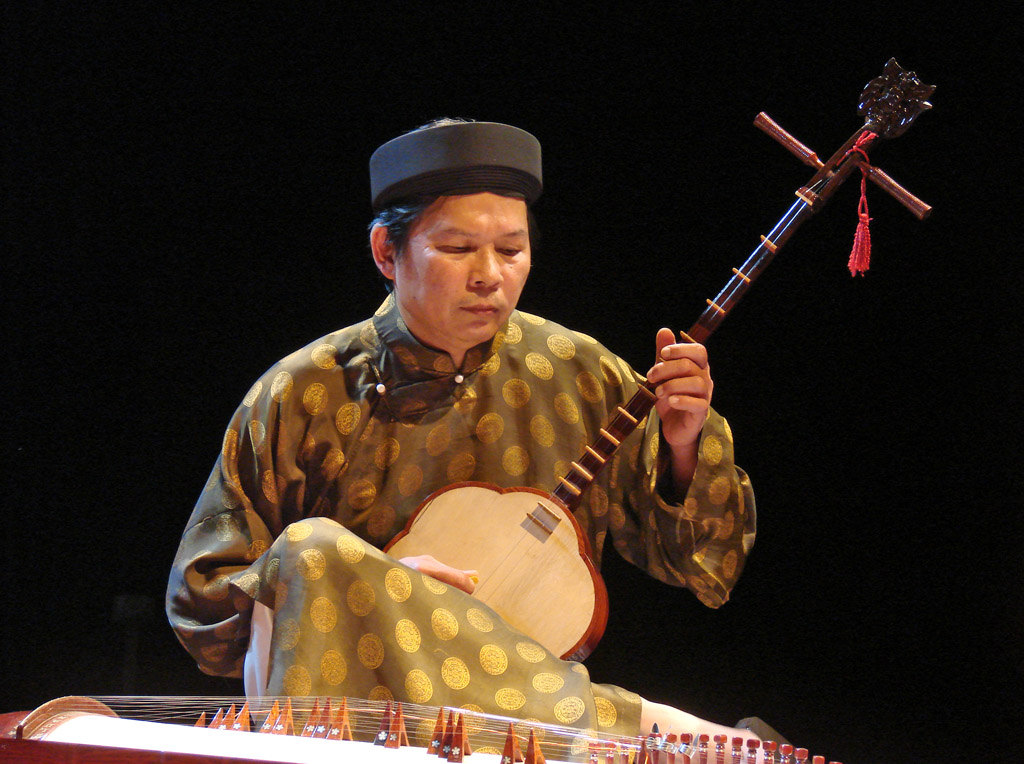
A man playing the đàn sến

The đàn sến (Chữ Nôm: 彈𬃤) is a Vietnamese plucked string instrument with two strings and a slender neck with raised frets. It is derived from the Chinese qinqin and is used primarily in the traditional music of southern Vietnam.

== See also ==
- Traditional Vietnamese musical instruments
