= Trống chầu =

Traditional Vietnamese drum

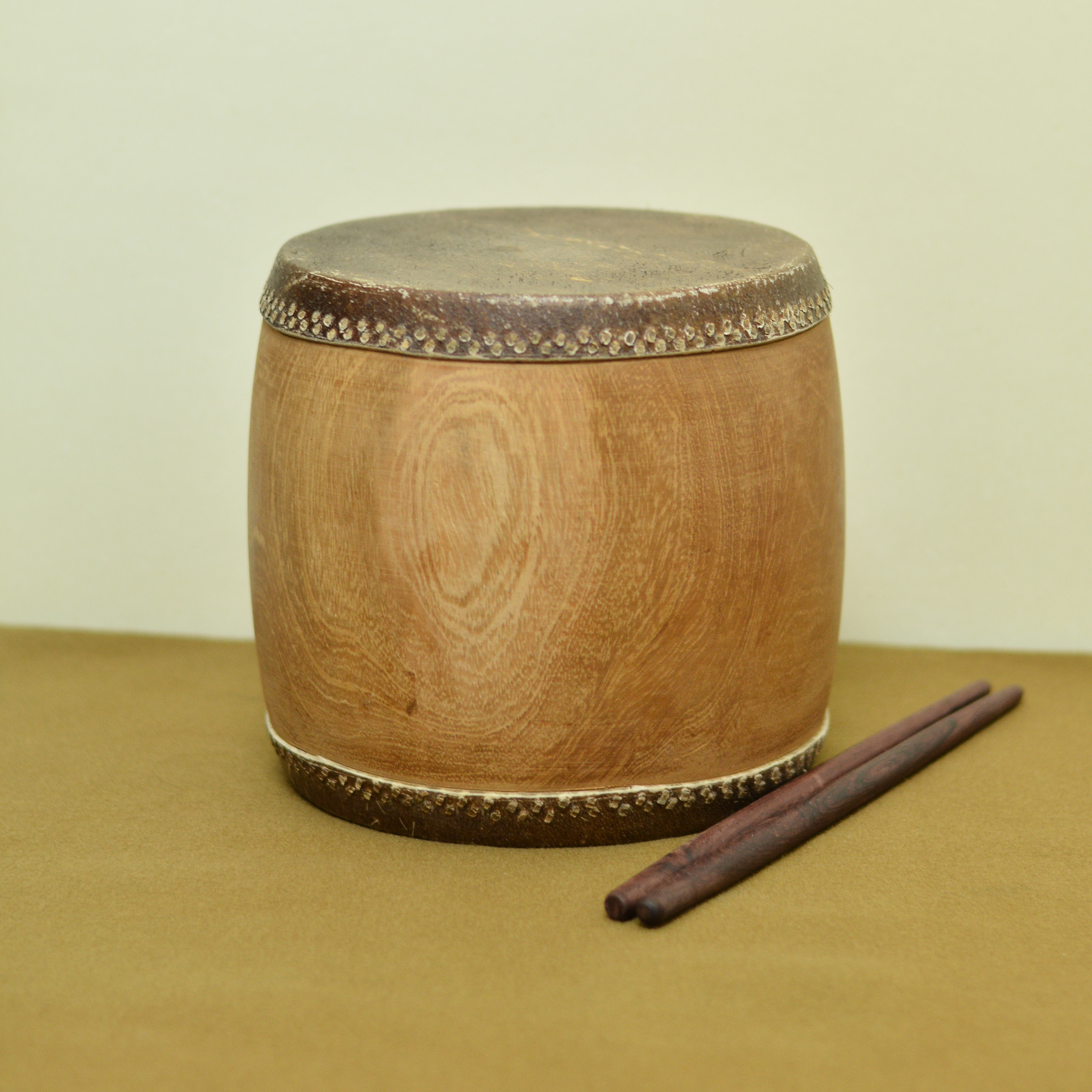
Trống đế

A trống đế or trống chầu is a traditional Vietnamese musical instrument also known as "praise drums". It is a small double-headed drum, beaten with a long wooden stick on the top side, causing a loud snapping sound.

== Description ==
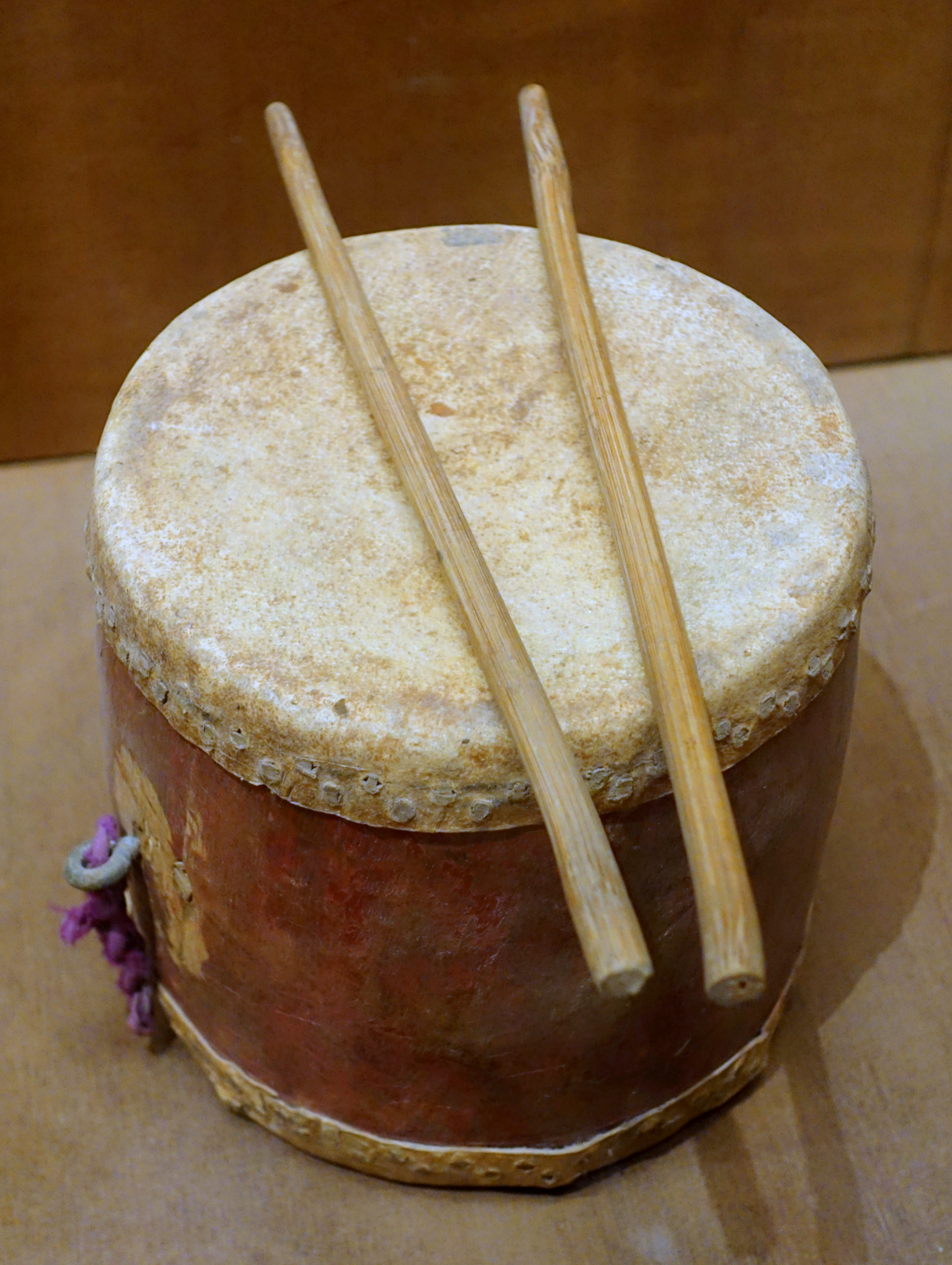
Trống chầu in the Vietnam Museum of Ethnology - Hanoi, Vietnam.

The two sides of the trống chầu where they are beaten, are made with buffalo hide. The main portion of the drum is carved from jack fruit wood

== Uses ==
The drummer is typically a well-recognized member of the audience and beats rhythms at the beginning and end of a performance, to mark singing phrases, and as a means of appreciation for a performance. It is the largest of the set of drums used in ca trù- the Vietnamese traditional chamber music. Performers also use it in a chèo or hát văn.
