= Sáo =

Sáo flutes of Vietnam

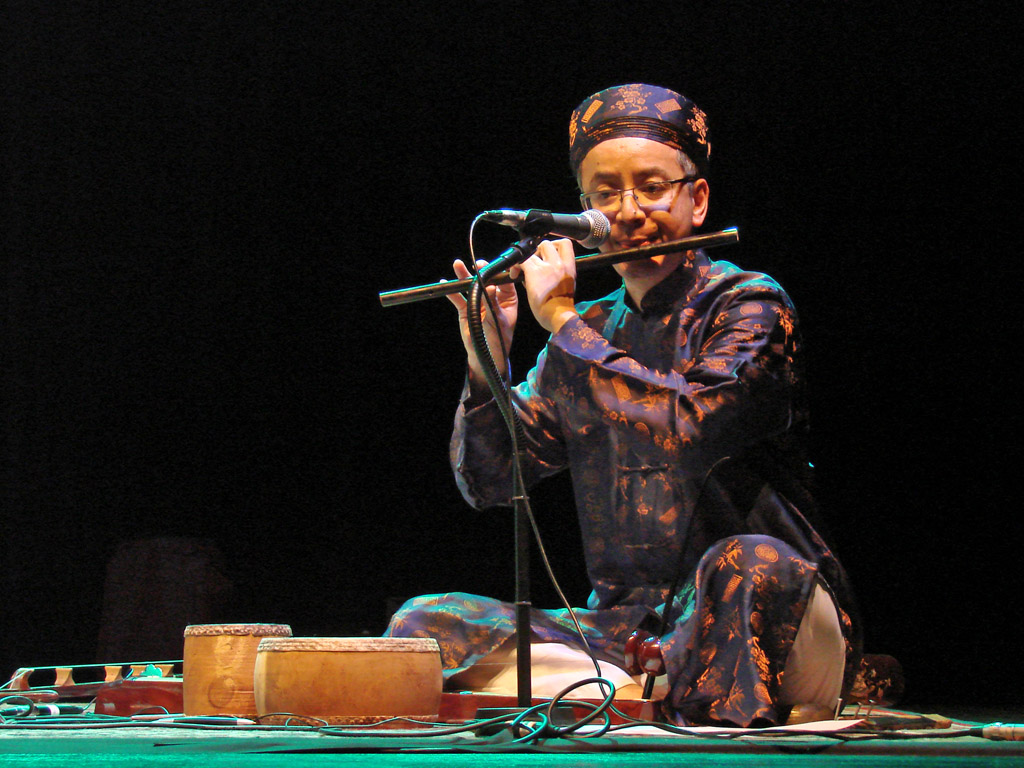
- Man performing with a sáo in Paris.

Woodwind instrument
- Other names: Sáo trúc/ sow troops
- Volume: high

Musicians
- Dinh Thin / Ngo Nam

The sáo (also called sáo trúc — pronounced [ʂǎːw ʈʂʊ̌kp], like "shall-joog") is a family of flutes found in Vietnam, considered a symbol of rural Vietnam. Sáo is the literal Vietnamese word for "flute". The most common variety is played with the flutist holding the sáo transversely to the right side with their mouth placed at the blowing hole. Other varieties include the Sáo Dọc, a kind of recorder similar to the Thai Khlui, the Sáo Bầu, and the Sáo Ôi, a recorder played by the Muong people. The sáo is usually performed solo or in an ensemble among other instruments in orchestras of Vietnamese popular opera Chèo, Chầu văn, and Nhã nhạc.

== Construction and materials ==
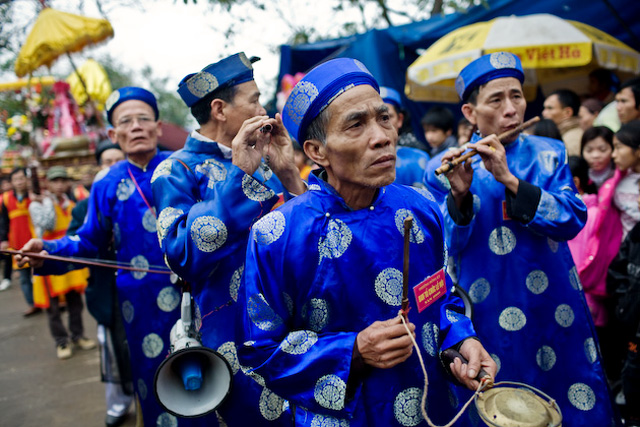
Traditional orchestra in Đồng Kỵ village festival

Most frequently made from a single piece of bamboo, the sáo measures between 40 and 55 centimeters in length and 1.5 to 2 centimeters in diameter, with six or ten finger holes and a tuning slide. Located inside the bamboo tube, near the oval blowing hole, is a soft wooden piece that adjust pitches when necessary. The first hole after the blowing hole is 12 centimeters away, while the other holes continue at a distance of 1 centimeter apart. At the other end of the flute, there is a non-covering hole called definite pitch hole, making it easier for the listener to discern pitch. The simple construction of the holes allow for very complex techniques in playing the instrument such as the use of breath with changes in the blowing angle for great or minute changes in sound quality, or partial-holding of finger holes to make delicate pitch changes. In the past, some flutes had a membrane similar to those on the Chinese Dizi, but these are not used anymore.

== Cultural uses and renovations ==
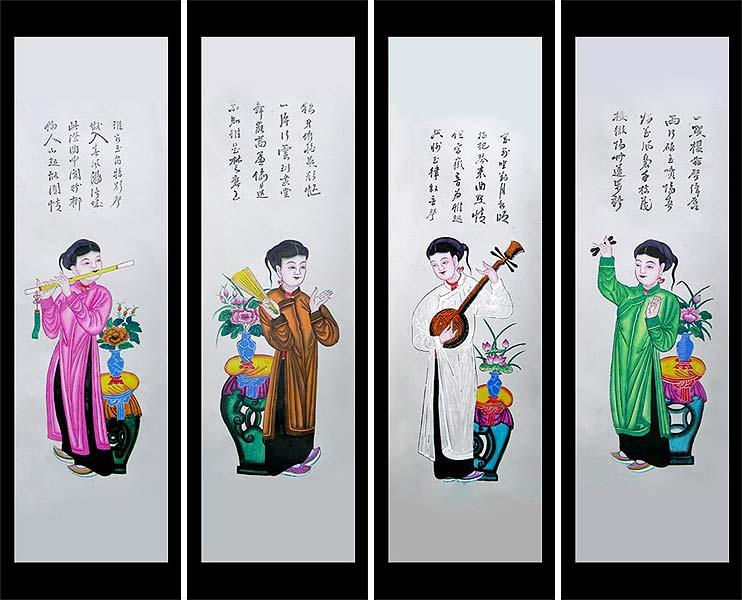
The first girl on the left is playing the flute in the painting Tố nữ

The sáo contains the musical spirit of Vietnamese countryside and its four peaceful seasons. In Vietnam, the people played sáo when resting on the fields or before going to sleep at night. By the end of the 1970s, artists Đinh Thìn and Ngo Nam modernized the sáo by making this 6-finger-hole flute into 10-finger-hole flute, extending its register. Examples of the difference between the two variations of the flute can be heard in Đinh Thìn's "Tiếng gọi mùa xuân" and Mão Mèo's performance of "tình xưa nghĩa cũ".

== See also ==
- Bamboo musical instruments
- Traditional Vietnamese musical instruments
