= Đàn đáy =

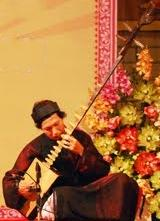
A man playing a đàn đáy

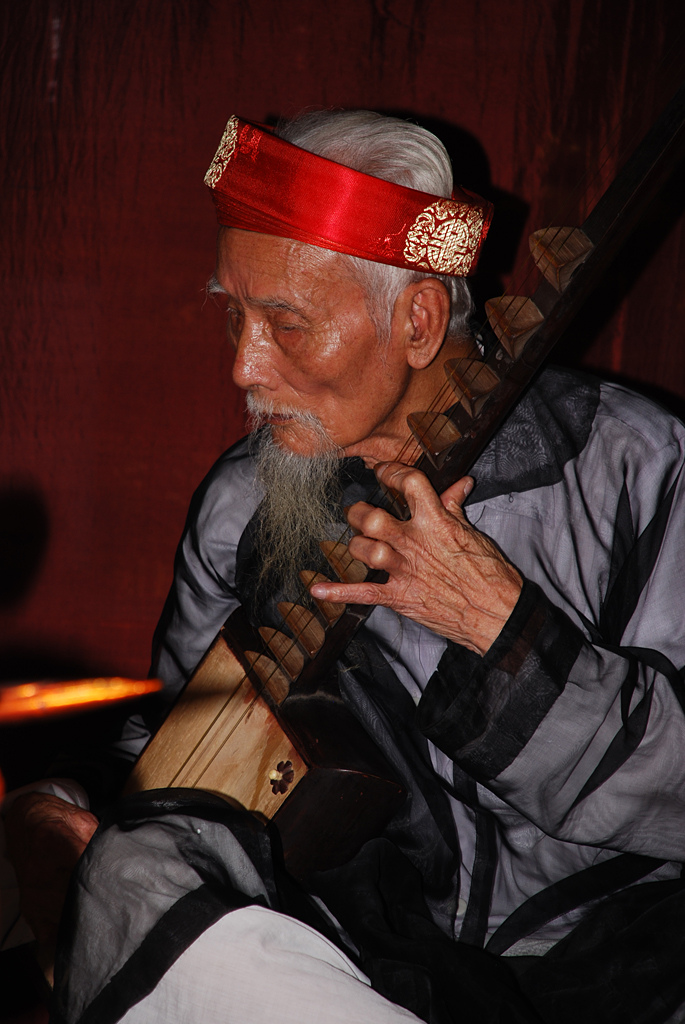
Old man holding a đàn đáy

The đàn đáy (Chữ Nôm: 彈𡌠) is a Vietnamese plucked lute with three strings, a trapezoidal wooden body, and a very long wooden neck with ten raised frets. Players formerly used silk strings, but since the late 20th century have generally used nylon.

== Usage ==
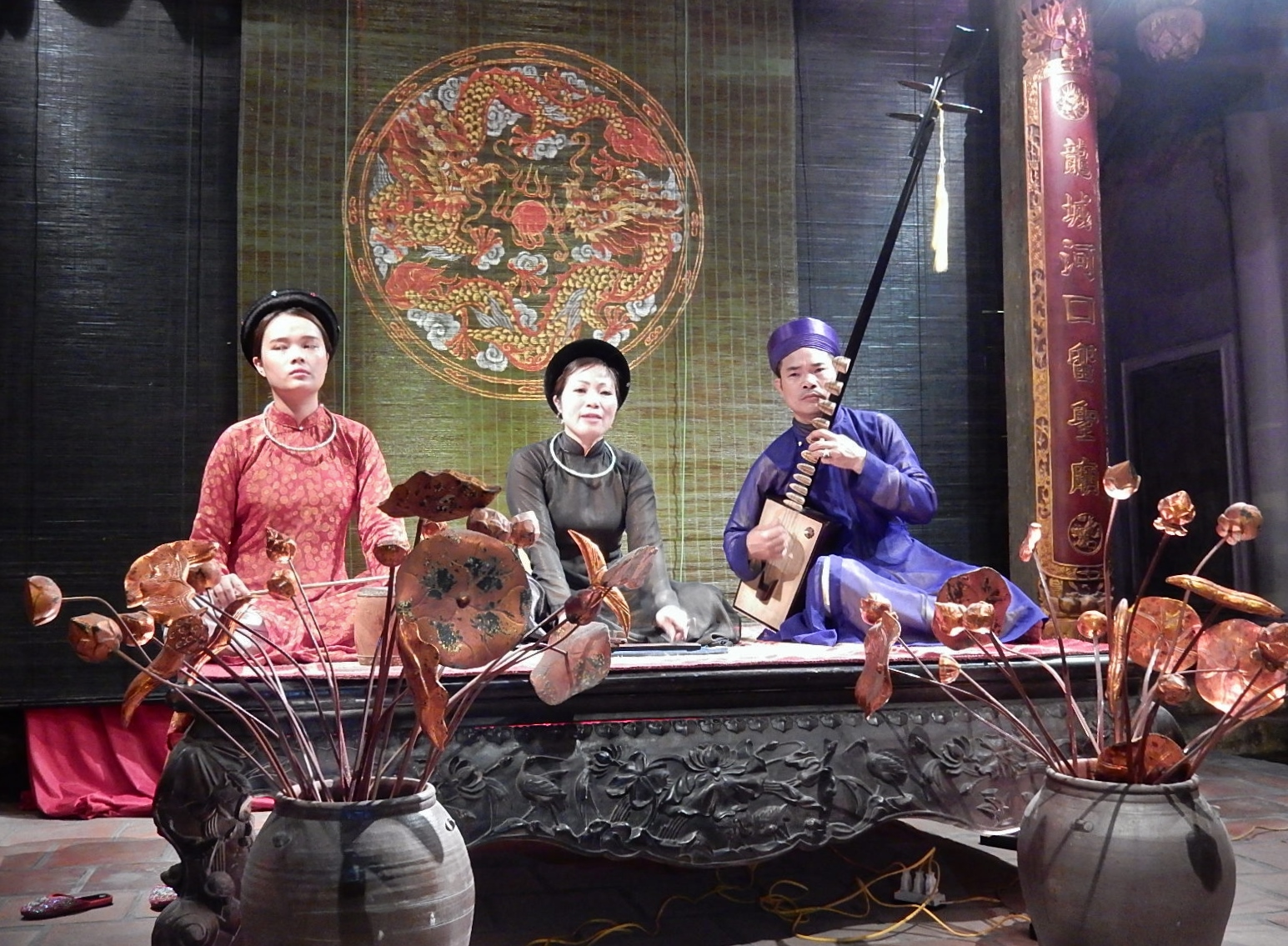
Đàn đáy used in Ca trù.

Đàn đáy tuning.

It is used primarily in Northern Vietnam, and is one of the accompanying instruments used in ca trù.

In the late 20th century, a modernized version of the electric bass guitar in the shape of the đàn đáy was developed for use in the neo-traditional music composed and performed at the Hanoi Conservatory. Unlike the đàn đáy, this instrument has a solid wooden body and metal strings, and without raised frets.

== Etymology ==
In the Vietnamese language, đàn is a classifier used primarily to refer to string instruments, and đáy means "bottom." Thus, the instrument's name translates literally as "bottom string instrument." However, the instrument's body has no back. According to one online source, the instrument was originally called vô để cầm, literally "bottomless stringed instrument."

== See also ==
- Music of Vietnam
- Traditional Vietnamese musical instruments
