= Nhã nhạc =

Form of Vietnamese court music

Nhã nhạc (Vietnamese: [ɲǎːˀ ɲàːˀk], 雅樂, "elegant music") is a traditional music of Vietnam. Vietnamese court music is very diverse, but the term nhã nhạc refers specifically to the Vietnamese court music performed from the Trần dynasty of the 13th century to the Nguyễn dynasty at the end of the 20th century.

== Nhã Nhạc ==
Vietnamese court music was performed at annual ceremonies, including anniversaries and religious holidays, as well as special events such as coronations, funerals or official receptions, by highly trained and skilled court musicians. Along with the musicians, a number of intricate court dances also exist (see Traditional Vietnamese dance). Both musicians and dancers wore elaborately designed costumes during their performances.

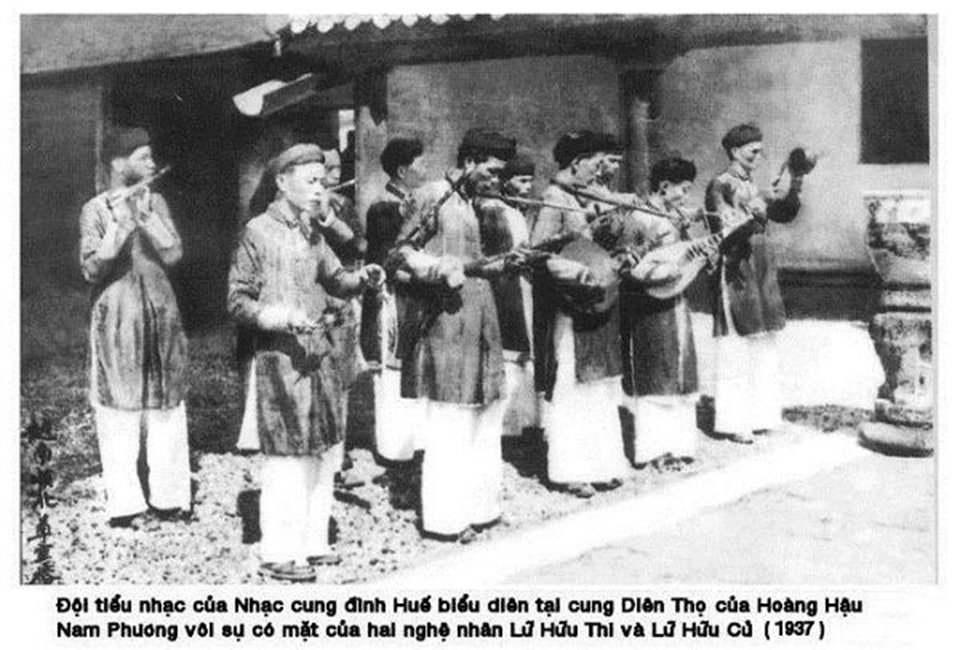
Imperial court musicians in 1937

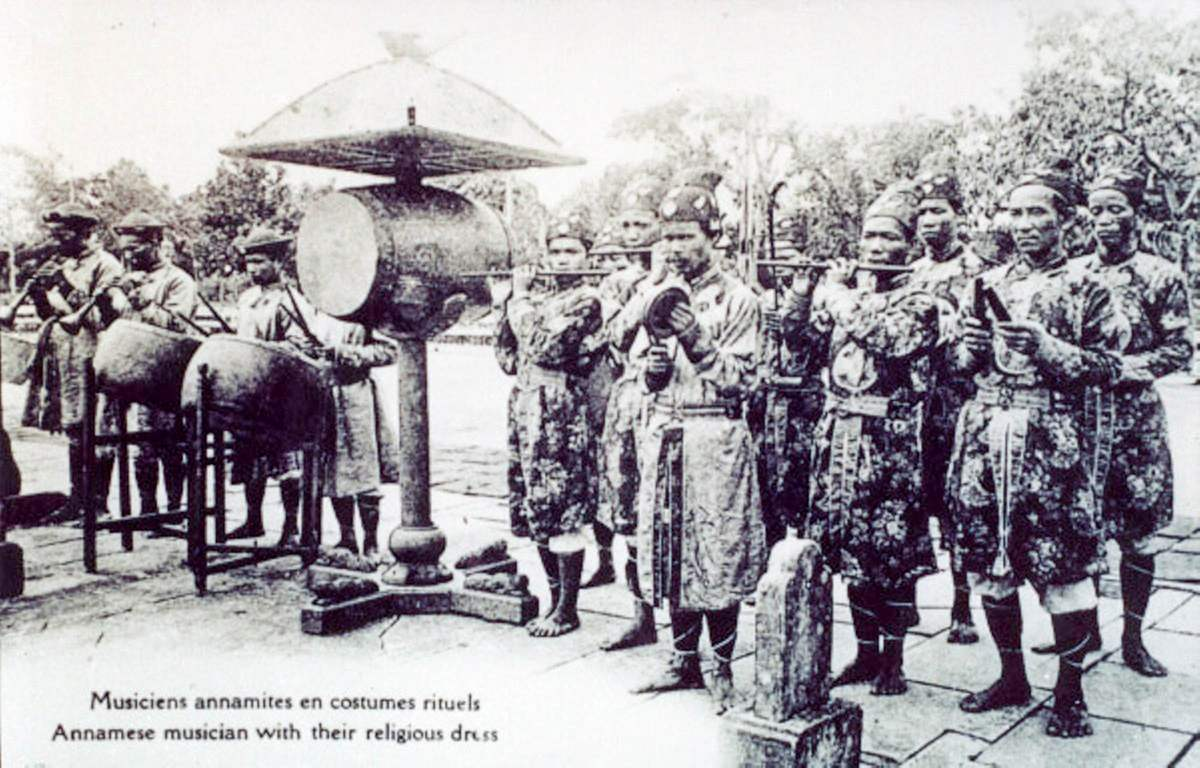
Imperial musicians

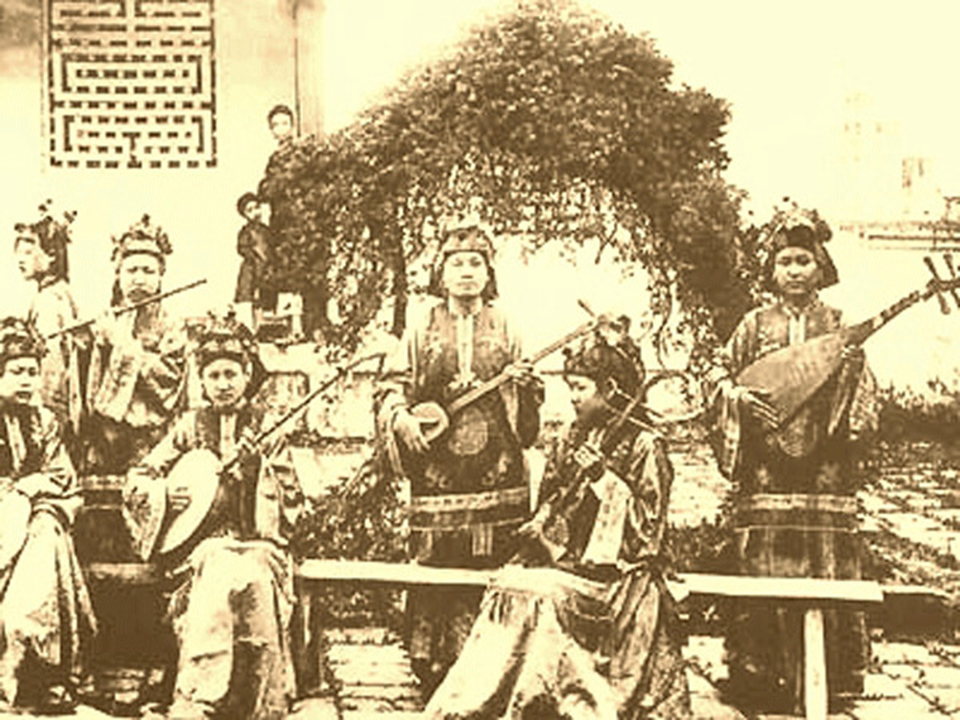
Court lady musicians

While the largest foreign influence on nhã nhạc came from the Ming dynasty court of China, later on there were also adapted a few elements from the music of Champa, which the Vietnamese court found intriguing.

=== Instruments ===
Instruments commonly used for nhã nhạc include kèn bầu (conical oboe), đàn tỳ bà (pear-shaped lute with four strings), đàn nguyệt (moon-shaped two-string lute), đàn tam (fretless lute with snakeskin-covered body and three strings), đàn nhị (two-stringed vertical fiddle), sáo (also called sáo trúc; a bamboo transverse flute), trống (drum played with sticks), and other percussion instruments.

== Development during the Nguyễn dynasty ==
It is believed that nhã nhạc did not truly reach the pinnacle of its development until the Nguyễn Dynasty, when it was standardized. The Nguyễn emperors declared it as the official court music, and it became an essential part of the extensive rituals of the royal palace.

== UNESCO ==
Nhã nhạc is still performed in the old capital of Huế. 'Nhã nhạc of Huế court' (Nhã nhạc cung đình Huế) was recognised in 2003 by UNESCO as a Masterpiece of the Oral and Intangible Heritage of Humanity. Extensive efforts have gone underway to preserve this truly unique and highly developed art.

== See also ==
- Aak
- Culture of Vietnam
- Gagaku
- History of Vietnam
- Music of Vietnam
- Traditional Vietnamese dance
- Yayue
