= Qinqin =

Chinese String Instrument

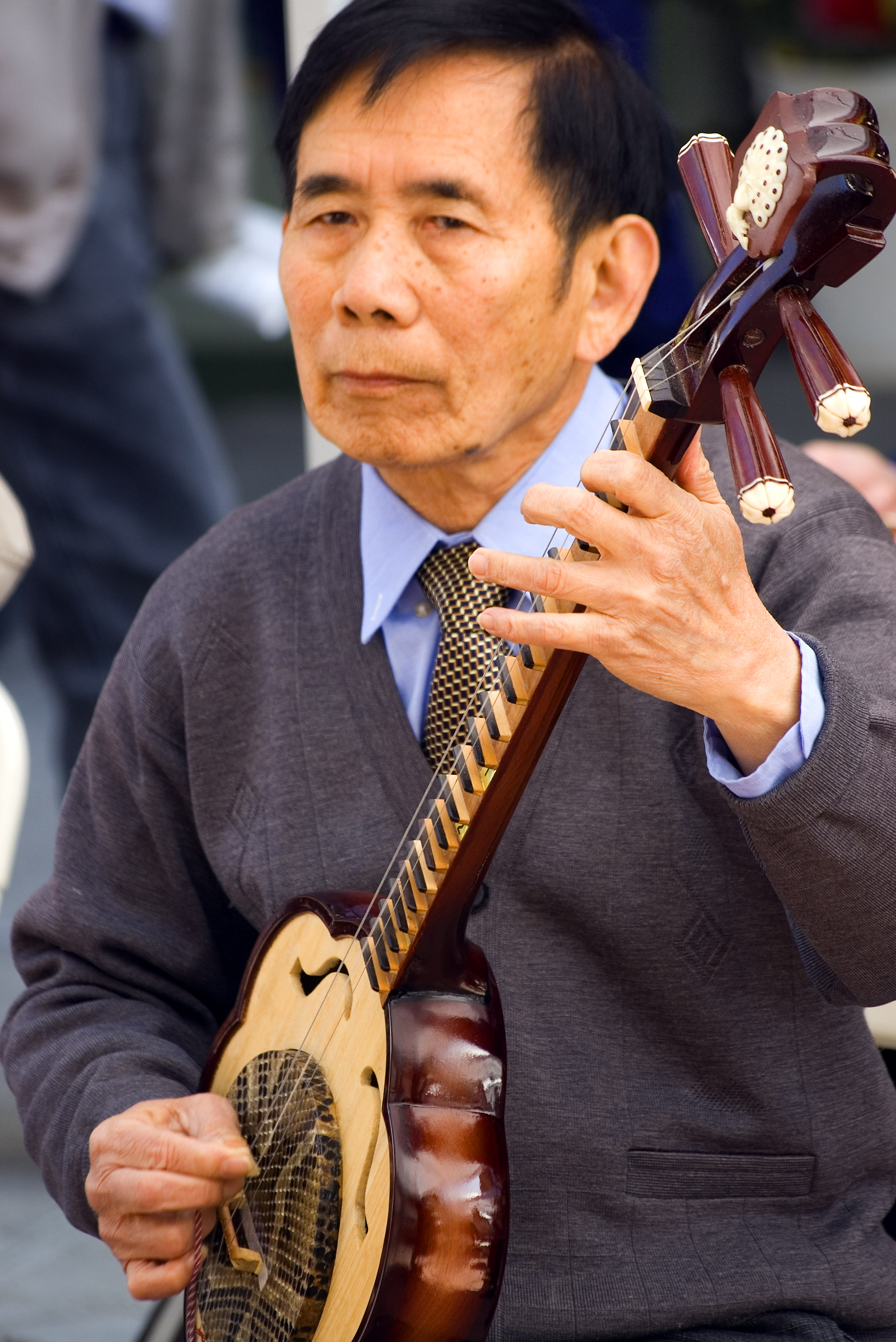
A musician playing a qinqin with python-skin resonator in a Cantonese street band in San Francisco

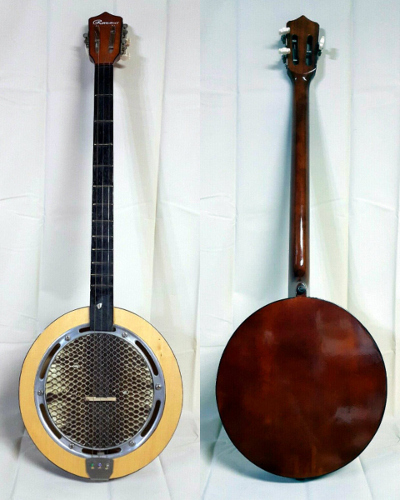
Front and back views of modern Qinqin.

The qinqin (秦琴; pinyin: qínqín; Vietnamese: Đàn sến) is a plucked Chinese lute. It was originally manufactured with a wooden body, a slender fretted neck, and three strings. Its body can be round, hexagonal (with rounded sides), or octagonal. Often, only two strings were used, as in certain regional silk-and-bamboo ensembles. In its hexagonal form (with rounded sides), it is also referred to as meihuaqin (梅花琴, literally "plum blossom instrument").

The qinqin is particularly popular in southern China: in Guangdong, Hong Kong and Macau. A similar instrument, the two-stringed đàn sến, has been adapted from the qinqin for use in the traditional music of southern Vietnam.

The frets on all Chinese lutes are high so that the fingers never touch the fretboard itself—distinctively different from western fretted instruments. This allows for a greater control over timbre and intonation than their western counterparts, but makes chordal playing more difficult.

There are two varieties of qinqins in modern China: the "traditional" version, characterized by "tall" Chinese-style frets (see photo), and the "modern" version, which uses fret wire instead. The modern version also closely resembles a banjo in that its body shape is usually round and includes a drum head made most often of sheep skin or python skin. The modern version also usually comes with three strings. The fret spacing used on the qinqin is not the same as on Western instruments such as the guitar or banjo, so the notes do not correspond to the 12TET (12-tone equal temperament) system. Unlike the pipa (and some other Chinese instruments), the fretboards of most models of qinqins have not been modernized to support the 12TET standard. As a result, many of the notes appear to Western listeners to be off (either sharp or flat) by about a quarter tone (half a semitone).

The approximate bridge position of the "floating" (movable) bridge on the qinqin can be easily calculated by doubling the distance between the nut and the 7th fret. The 7th fret on the qinqin is an octave higher than open string. Since the distance between the nut and the 7th fret is about 11 inches, the bridge should be located about 22 inches from the nut. This means the bridge will be located about 60% across the drum head, or 40% before the tail end of the drum head. A more precise location can be determined by using a digital tuner and comparing the notes produced on each string, first the open string, and then fretted at the 7th fret. The bridge position should be slightly adjusted so the note produced is "spot on" (but an octave different) at both open string and stopped at fret 7. Doing this for all three strings will usually result in a slight tilt to the bridge with the bass string maybe 1 or 2 mm longer than the treble string. This method is often used with other floating bridge instruments like banjos, stick dulcimers and cigar box guitars. The 22-inch scale length of the qinqin makes it comparable to the tenor banjo.

== See also ==
- Traditional Chinese musical instruments
