= T'rưng =

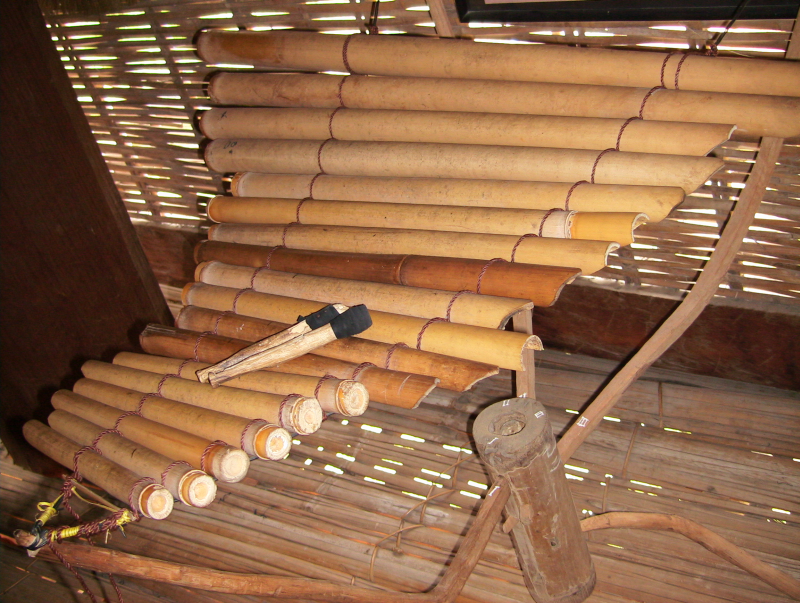
a đàn T'rưng of the Bahnar people

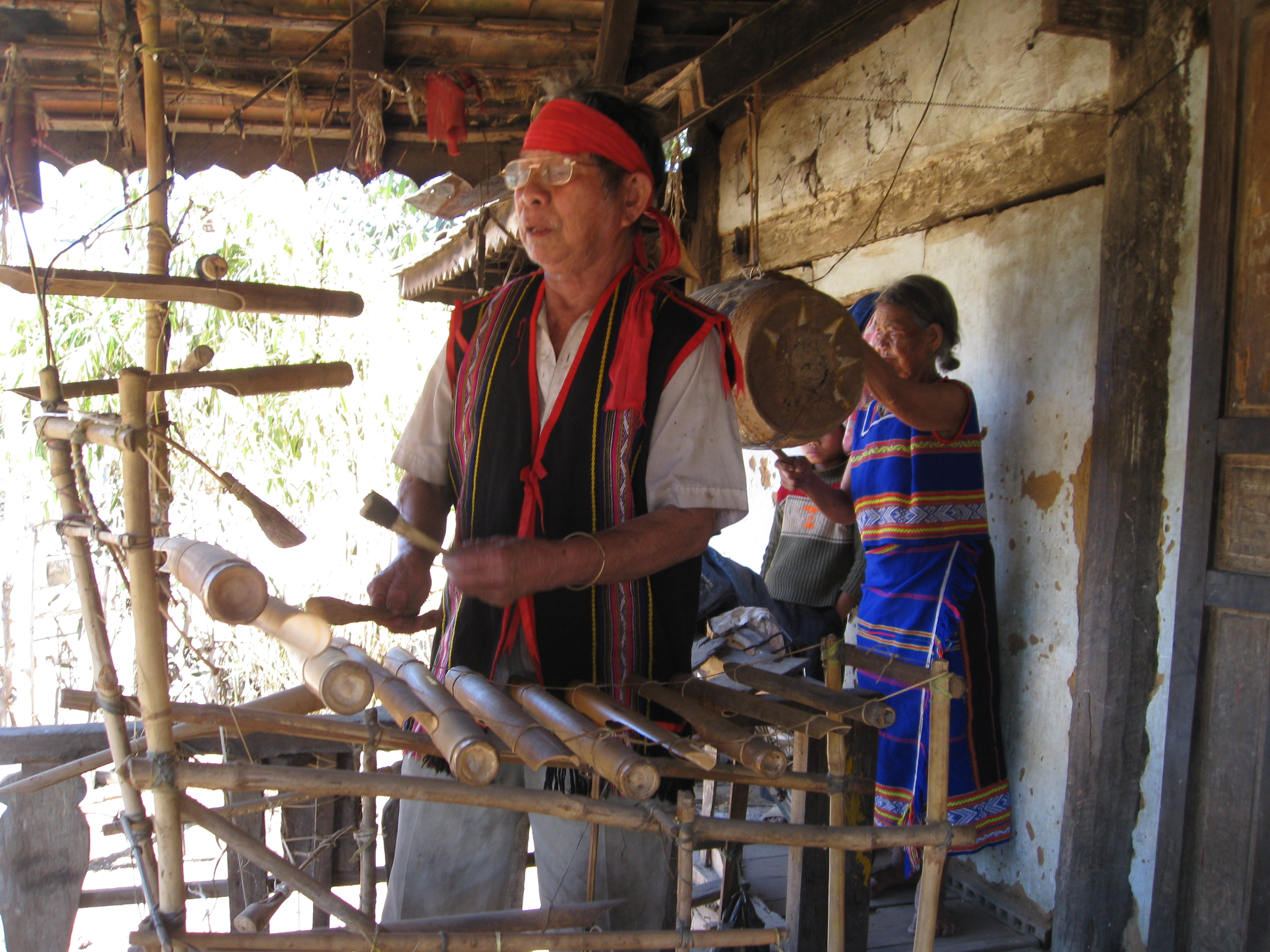
The bamboo xylophone being played

The t'rung (Vietnamese: đàn t'rưng) is a traditional bamboo xylophone used by the Jarai people and Bahnar people in Vietnam's Central Highlands. More complicated developments of the Jarai and Bahnar's xylophone have become used in Vietnamese traditional music ensembles (known as the đàn t'rưng) representing the music of the highland minorities.
