= Ca trù =

Vietnamese musical storytelling genre

Ca trù singing
- UNESCO Intangible Cultural Heritage
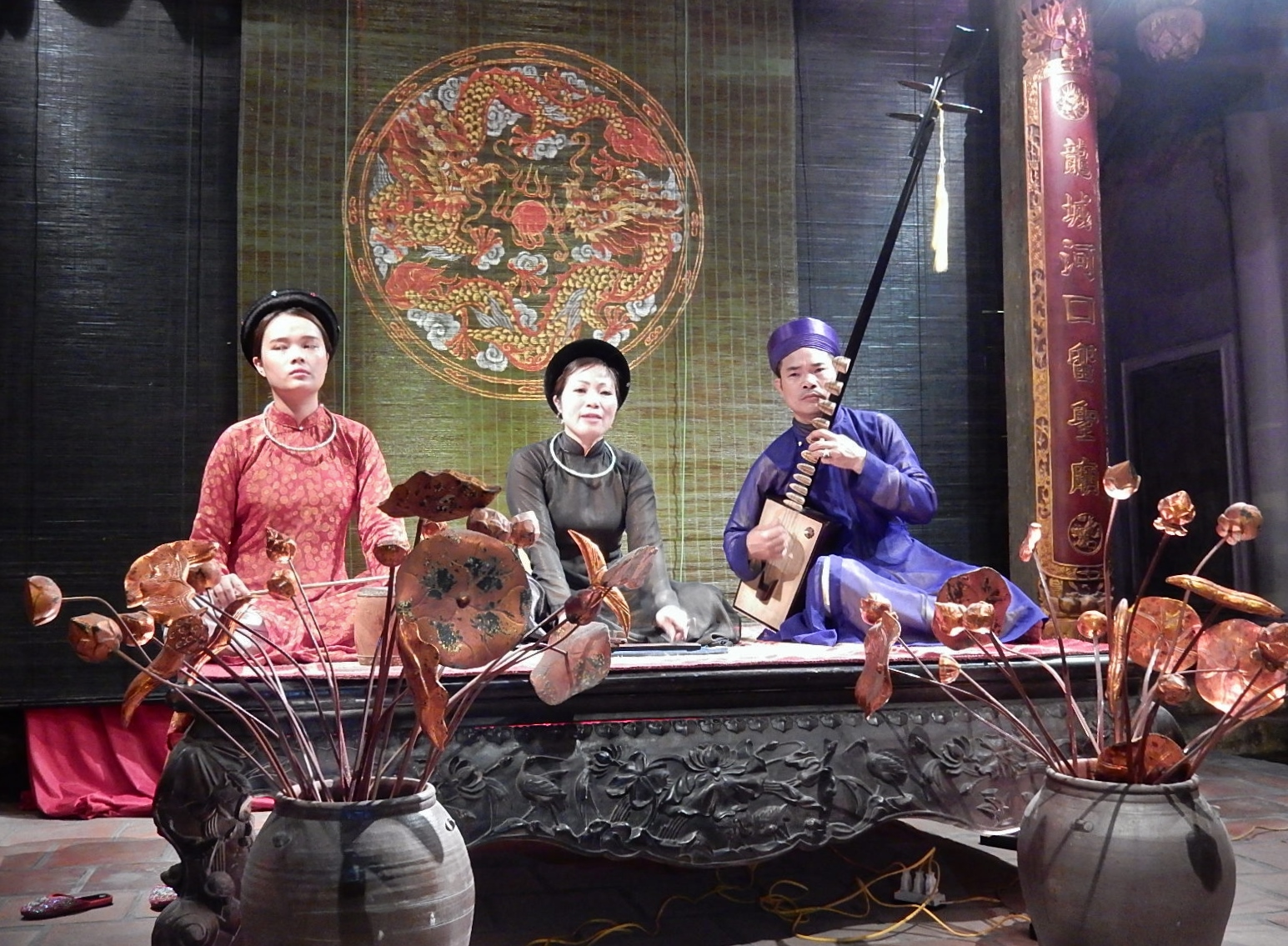
- A ca trù performance
- Country: Vietnam
- Reference: 00309
- Region: Asia and the Pacific

Inscription history
- Inscription: 2009 (4th session)
- List: Need of Urgent Safeguarding

Ca trù (Vietnamese: [kaː ʈû], 歌籌, "tally card songs"), also known as hát ả đào, is a Vietnamese genre of musical storytelling performed by a featuring female vocalist, with origins in northern Vietnam. For much of its history, it was associated with a pansori-like form of entertainment that encompassed entertaining the wealthy and the royal court, as well as with ceremonies involving the performance of religious songs.

Ca trù is inscribed on the list of Intangible Cultural Heritage in need of Urgent Safeguarding in 2009.

== History ==
There are different myths and theories related to ca trù's conception. There is a theory points to a woman named Đào Thị, a talented musician who was beloved by the Lý Dynasty imperial court. This theory also claims that ever since the time of Đào Thị, in admiration of her, women who held a profession as singers (such as ca trù singers) were referred to as Đào nương ("nương" here refers roughly to "maiden" or "lady"). The latter is true although this term is no longer widely used in modern Vietnam.

What is known for sure is that ca trù started off like many of Vietnam's arts as being a form of entertainment for the royal court. Officially ca tru count the age of their profession since the Later Le dynasty (Vietnamese: Nhà Hậu Lê, 1428–1789), which at that time musicians called Vietnamese: hát khuôn performed only on religious court ceremonies. It was only later on that it branched out into being performed at small inns. Indeed, it was mainly scholars and other members of the elite who enjoyed the genre.

In the 15th century, ca trù spread through Northern Vietnam. The artists might be called to celebrate a son's birth, or to celebrate the signing of a contract. Ca trù were outside of the caste system, so they could entertain the most noble clients.

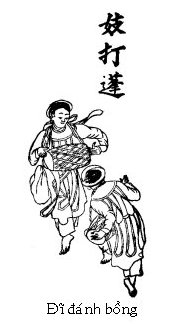
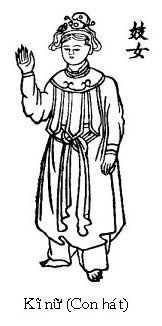
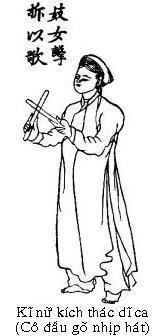
Three drawings of Cô đầu performing ca trù in the early 20th century.

In the late 20th century, ca trù nearly died out. After the communists came to power following the 1945 August Revolution and the First Indochina War, ca trù was discouraged and even suppressed, being associated with prostitution, feudal romanticism, colonial decadence, and superstition. Consequently, before 1976 there were only two ca trù professionals: the musician Nguyễn Xuân Khoát and the artisan Quách Thị Hồ. Later they both started to revive the tradition of ca trù.

In the past, men were allowed to have several wives and concubines. Thus, it was commonly known that many famous ca trù singers did indeed have affairs with important men, but it was just something to be accepted as a part of society back then, and not a part of the profession itself.

As of 2009, extensive efforts are being made to invigorate the genre, including many festivals and events where several types of ca trù (among other related arts) are performed. Vietnam has also completed documents to have ca trù recognized by UNESCO as an Intangible Cultural Heritage.

By 2011 there were 140 ca trù songs from 23 clubs.

== Instruments ==
Ca trù, like many ancient and highly developed arts, has many forms. However, the most widely known and widely performed type of ca trù involves only three performers: the female vocalist, lute player and a spectator (who also takes part in the performance). Sometimes dance is also performed at the same time.

The female singer provides the vocals whilst playing her phách (small wooden sticks beaten on a small bamboo bar to serve as percussion).

She is accompanied by a man who plays the đàn đáy, a long-necked, 3-string lute used almost exclusively for the ca trù genre.

Last is the spectator (often a scholar or connoisseur of the art) who strikes a trống chầu (praise drum) in praise (or disapproval) of the singer's performance, usually with every passage of the song. The way in which he strikes the drum shows whether he likes or dislikes the performance, but he always does it according to the beat provided by the vocalists' phách percussion.

The number of ca tru melodies is 56, they are called Vietnamese: thể cách.

New observers to the art often comment on how strikingly odd the vocal technique sounds, but it is the vocals themselves that are essential in defining ca trù.

== Ca trù inns ==
Ca trù literally translates as "tally card songs." This refers to the bamboo cards men bought when they visited ca trù inns, where this music was most often performed in the past. Men would give the bamboo cards they purchased to the woman of choice after her performance, and she would collect money based upon how many cards she was given.

Scholar-bureaucrats and other members of the elite most enjoyed this genre. They often visited these inns to be entertained by the talented young women, who did not only sing, but with their knowledge of poetry and the arts could strike up a witty conversation along with serving food and drink.

Besides these inns, ca trù was also commonly performed in communal houses or private homes.

== In modern Vietnamese media ==
Along with efforts made to preserve the genre, ca trù has been appearing in much of recent Vietnamese pop culture, including movies such as the award-winning film Mê thảo: thời vang bóng, "Trò đời", "Trăng tỏ thềm lan", "Thương nhớ ở ai". The memory of anyone or in songs "Một nét ca trù ngày xuân", "Mái đình làng biển" by musician Nguyễn Cường, "Trên đỉnh Phù Vân", "Không thể và có thể", "Chảy đi sông ơi! ", "Một thoáng Tây Hồ" by Phó Đức Phương, "Chiều phủ Tây Hồ" by Phú Quang, "Chị tôi" by Trọng Đài and poem by Đoàn Thị Tảo, "Hà Nội linh thiêng hào hoa" by Lê Mây, "Đất nước lời ru" by Phan Huỳnh Điểu", "Nắng có còn xuân" by Đức Trí", Giọt sương bay lên" by Nguyễn Vĩnh Tiến, "Đá trông chồng" by Lê Minh Sơn, "Vịnh xuân đất Tổ" by Quang Vinh. In 1997, for the first time "Trên đỉnh Phù Vân" was made public by singer Mỹ Linh. Contemporary folk sound, with the up-and-down sounds never easy for a soft musician, so choosing this song to sing was a very brave decision by Mỹ Linh in the early days of her career. The way to deal with the color of ca trù is probably intended to bring out the magic in every song.

Bích Câu Đạo Quán Club, founded in low has 90 members, 30 or 40 of whom gather on a given Saturday evenings. The oldest artist is 88 years old. According to the director, 48 -year-old Nguyễn Vân Mai, who trains younger singers and introduces them to classical songs: "It is very difficult to find young singers who wish to learn this art form. It is also difficult to find good teachers who can convey both the enthusiasm and the technical knowledge.

== Tribute ==
On February 23, 2020, Google celebrated the Ca Trù's Founder Commemoration Day with a Google Doodle.

== Galleries ==
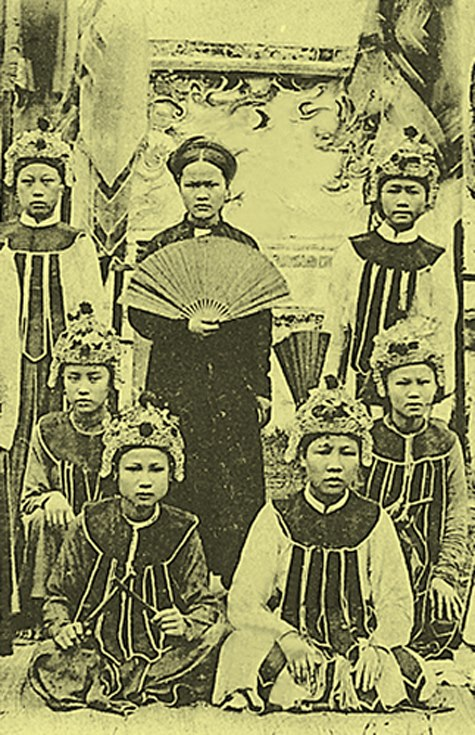

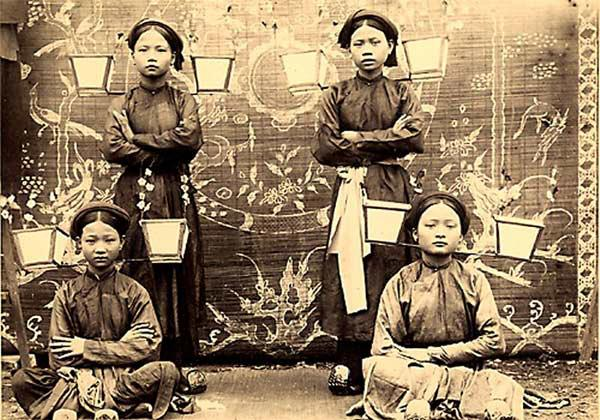

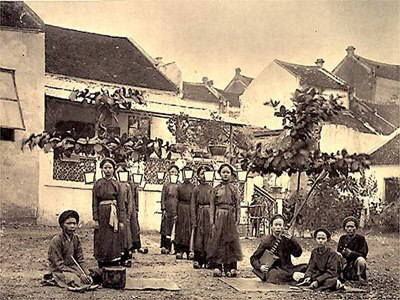

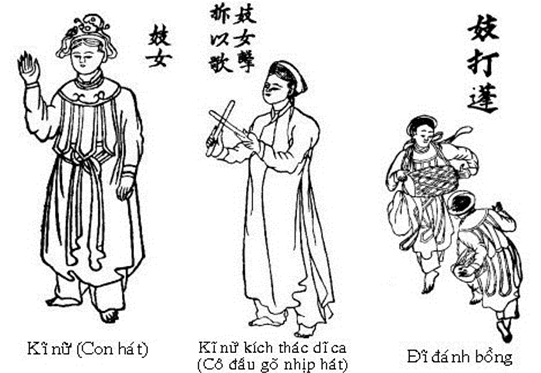

== See also ==
- Pansori
- Tawaif
- Culture of Vietnam
- History of Vietnam
- Music of Vietnam
- Traditional Vietnamese dance
- Vietnamese theatre

== Bibliography ==
- Norton, Barley. "Singing the Past: Vietnamese Ca Tru, Memory, and Mode." Asian Music, vol. 36, no. 2 (Summer/Fall 2005).
- Wettermark, Esbjörn; Lundström, Håkan (2016). "Ca trù: The Revival and Repositioning of a Vietnamese Music Tradition". In Schippers, Huib; Grant, Catherine (eds.). Sustainable Futures for Music Cultures: An Ecological Perspective. Oxford University Press. pp. 303–332. doi:10.1093/acprof:oso/9780190259075.003.0011.
- Bùi Trọng Hiền (2024). Ả đào: Một khảo cứu về lịch sử và hệ âm luật. Nhà xuất bản Văn học & Omega Plus.
