= Yueqin =

Traditional Chinese string instrument

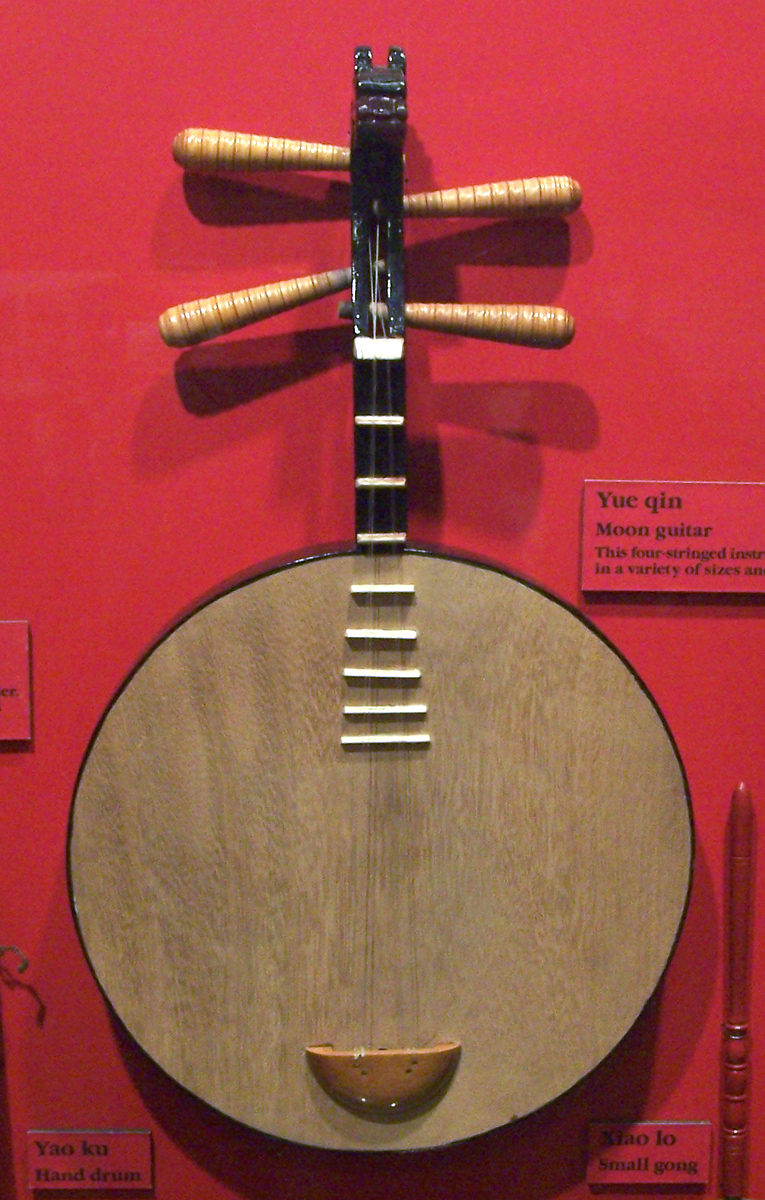
- The yueqin. The instrument comes in a variety of sizes and pitches.

String instrument
- Classification: String instrument
- Hornbostel–Sachs classification: 321.322 (Composite chordophone)
- Developed: China

Related instruments
- Ruan

The yueqin (Chinese: 月琴; pinyin: Yuèqín; Japanese: 月琴, romanized: Gekkin; Korean: 월금/月琴, romanized: Wolgeum; Vietnamese: Nguyệt cầm/月琴 or Vietnamese: Đàn nguyệt/彈月), also called a moon lute or moon guitar, is a traditional Chinese string instrument. It is a lute with a round, hollow soundboard, a short fretted neck, and usually four strings. It is an important instrument in the Peking opera orchestra, often taking the role of main melodic instrument in lieu of the bowed string section.

The instrument was invented in China in the 3rd to 5th centuries AD, during the Jin dynasty. The ruan, another Chinese instrument, is the ancestor of the yueqin. The name yueqin once applied to all instruments with a moon-shaped soundboard, including the ruan; however, "yueqin" now applies to a separate category from the ruan family.

== Etymology ==
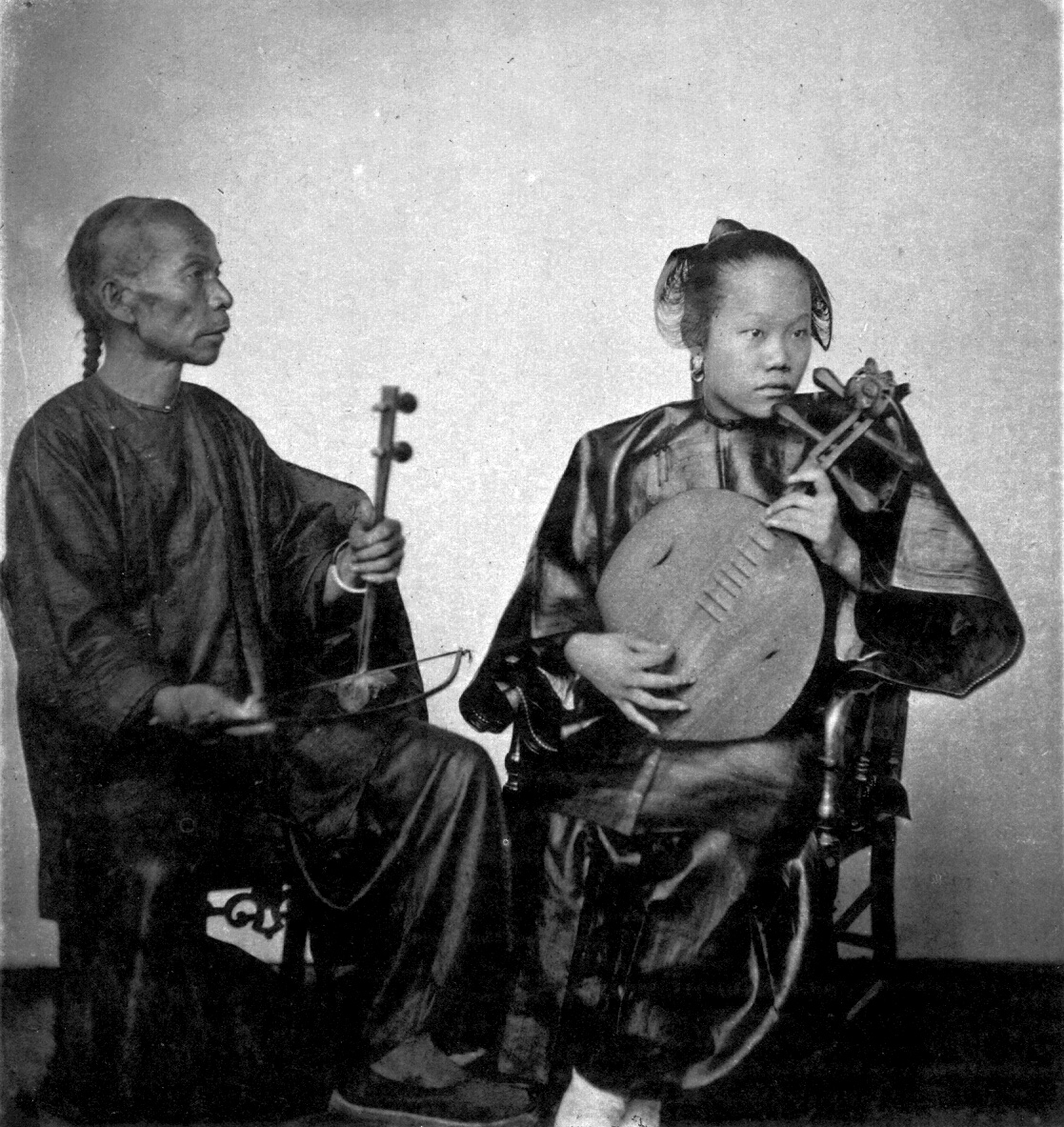
Chinese musician playing the yueqin (right), 1874

The word yueqin is made of two characters, yuè (月; "moon") and qín (琴; "stringed instrument, zither"). Its name in Korean (wolgeum), Japanese (gekkin) and Vietnamese (nguyệt cầm) mean the same thing, and are Sinoxenic words, meaning they were borrowed from Chinese, but pronounced in the local way.

== History ==
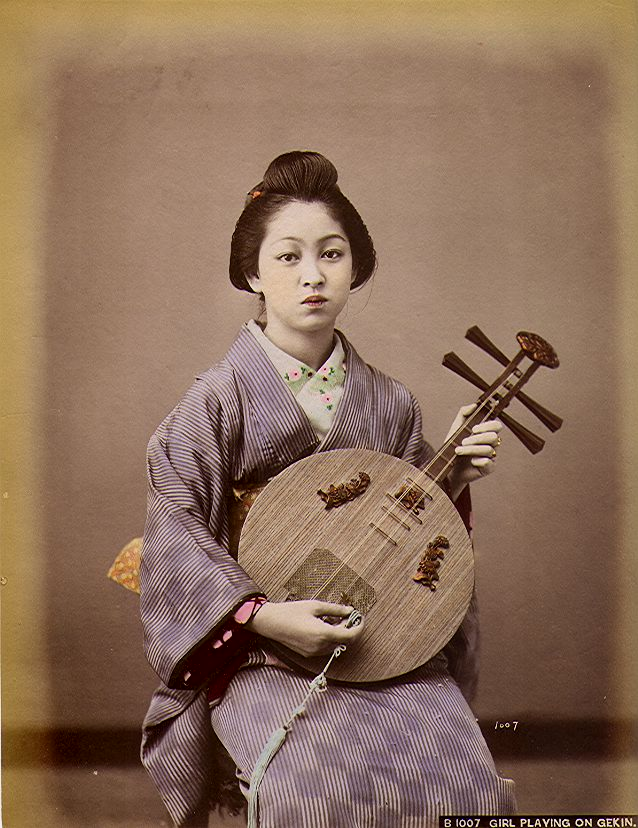
A Japanese woman playing a gekkin, c. 1890

The yueqin originated from the ruan, a similar stringed instrument that may have been invented as early as the 2nd century BC, during the Western Han dynasty. It grew popular during the Jin Dynasty (265–420), and has been known by its current name since the Tang dynasty. The instrument was introduced to Japan during the Tang Dynasty, and reached its peak in the 1830s. Yueqin was banned in Japan during the Second World War, and it was restored after the war. Another very similar instrument, called đàn đoản or đàn tứ, is occasionally used in Vietnam.

== Construction and types ==
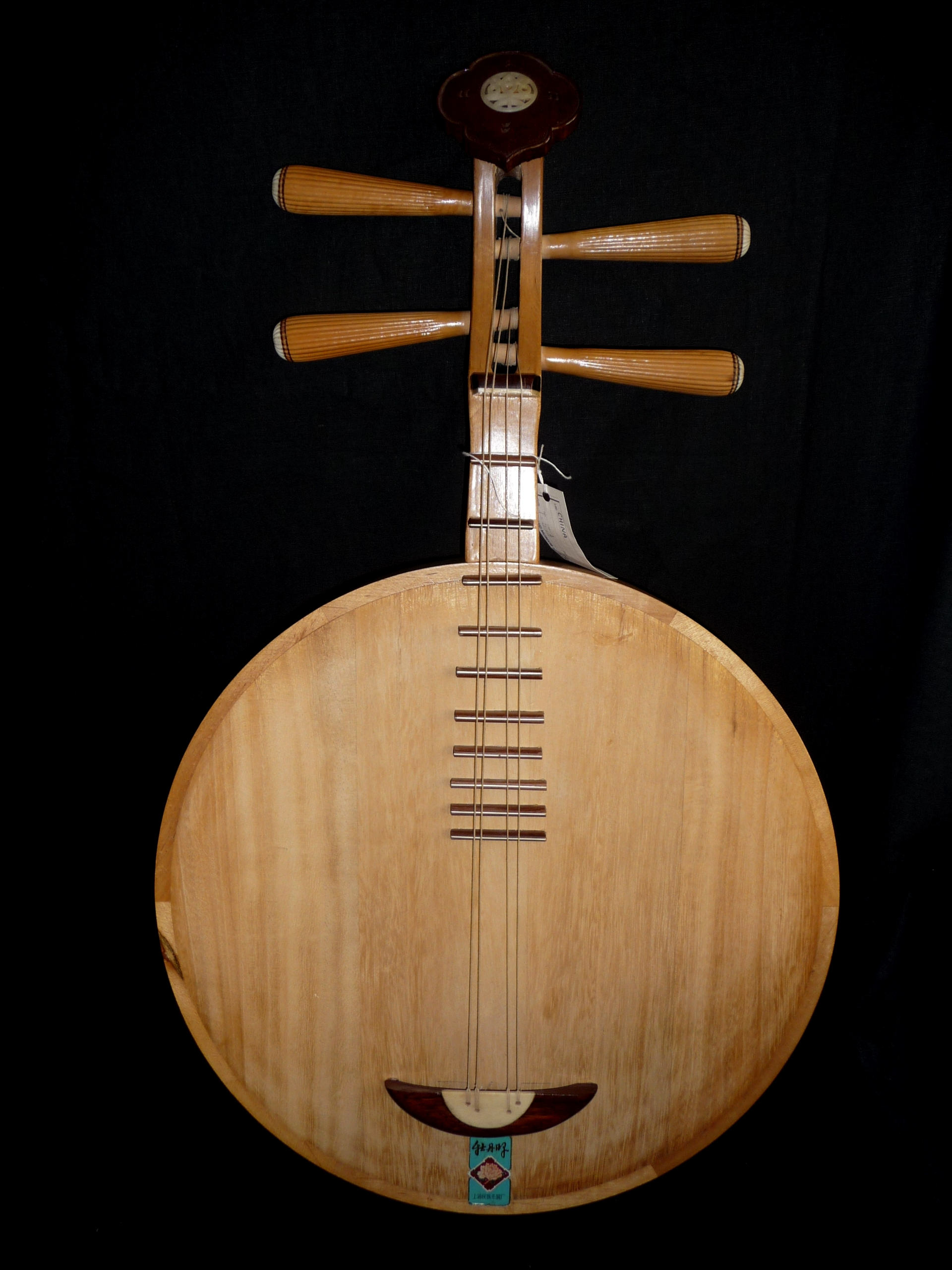
A yueqin in the Queensland Museum

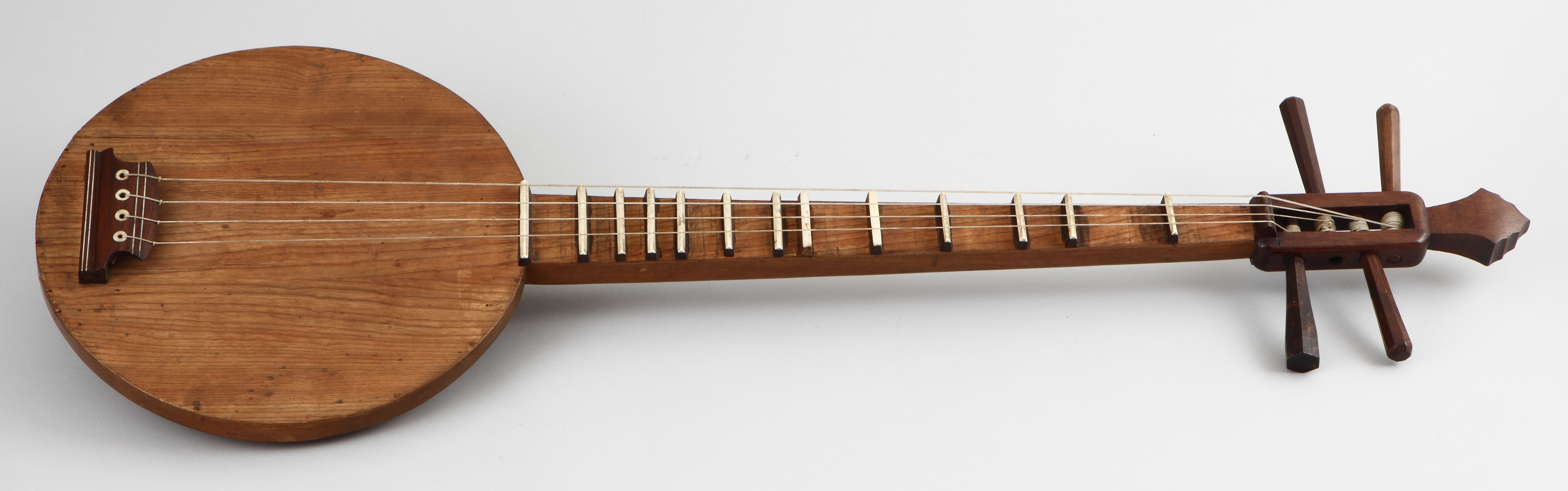
Wolgeum of Korea

=== Soundboard ===
The yueqin typically has a round soundboard with no sound-hole, but inside the sound box are one or more strands of wire attached only at one end, so that they vibrate, giving the instrument a particular timbre and resonance. Occasionally, the body of the yueqin may be octagonal in shape.

=== Frets ===
The yueqin has a short fretted neck. Frets on all Chinese lutes are high so that the fingers never touch the actual body—distinctively different from western fretted instruments. This allows for a greater control over timbre and intonation than their western counterparts, but makes chordal playing more difficult. The frets were formerly arranged rather like those on a mountain dulcimer, so that the instrument is diatonic; however, the fret size is high enough that any pitch may be bent up a minor 3rd. Modern yueqin have frets tuned in semitones.

=== Strings ===
Most yueqin have four strings, although others have two or three. Yueqin used for Beijing opera have two strings, only one of which is actually used, the lower string being there purely for sympathetic resonance. In Taiwan, the yueqin has a longer neck, and two or three strings.

The strings on the traditional form of the instrument were made of silk, though nylon is generally used today. The anchor on a modern yueqin may have up to five holes, so it can be strung and tuned as a three or four-stringed instrument. The nut, at the peghead end of the instrument, is filed with notches appropriate to the number and position of the strings. There is no bridge or saddle; the strings are simply attached to the anchor at the base of the instrument.

==== Tuning ====
The strings are tuned in courses of two (each pair of strings is tuned to a single pitch), generally tuned to the interval of a perfect fifth. Three-string instruments are often tuned A D. Four-string instruments are often tuned to A D a d; however, in recent practice, the instrument is tuned G D g d so modern liuqin and ruan players can easily double on yueqin.

=== Plectrum and picks ===
A long, sharp plectrum is often used to play the yueqin, which is sometimes attached to the instrument with a piece of cord. In Beijing opera, the player uses a small wooden dowel instead of a plectrum to perform, and only plays in first position; this requires the performer to use octave displacement in order to play all the pitches within a given melody. Modern yueqin are often played with a guitar pick.

== Compared with the ruan ==
While both instruments have a moon-shaped soundboard, the modern ruan uses a bridge, whereas the yueqin simply attaches the strings to the frame, similar to the design of the pipa. In addition, most yueqin do not have the obvious double soundholes, like the ruan; instead, they have the single small soundhole located under where the strings are attached (also similar to pipa). Both features gives the yueqin a sound quality in between ruan and pipa. While the ruan is used mostly for its lower range instruments (i.e., zhongruan and daruan), yueqin is primarily a treble tuned instrument, even though the size of its soundboard is larger than that of the zhongruan.

Southern yueqin have a long neck, use two strings, and have an improvisational and flexible intonation practice; some Southern yueqin have also acoustical metal coils inside the soundboard to amplify the instrument. Northern yueqin have a very short neck, and have bamboo in both the front and back, requiring the performer to hold the instrument away from their body. The northern instruments range from single to four stringed instruments. Regardless of the neck size or strings, all yueqin are tuned around the same treble pitch level. A common technique in performance is "snapping" the pick on the string (similar to Japanese shamisen.) Yueqin is the loudest member of the plucked lute family of Chinese instruments; one instrument can easily be heard over a full Chinese orchestra.

== Gallery ==
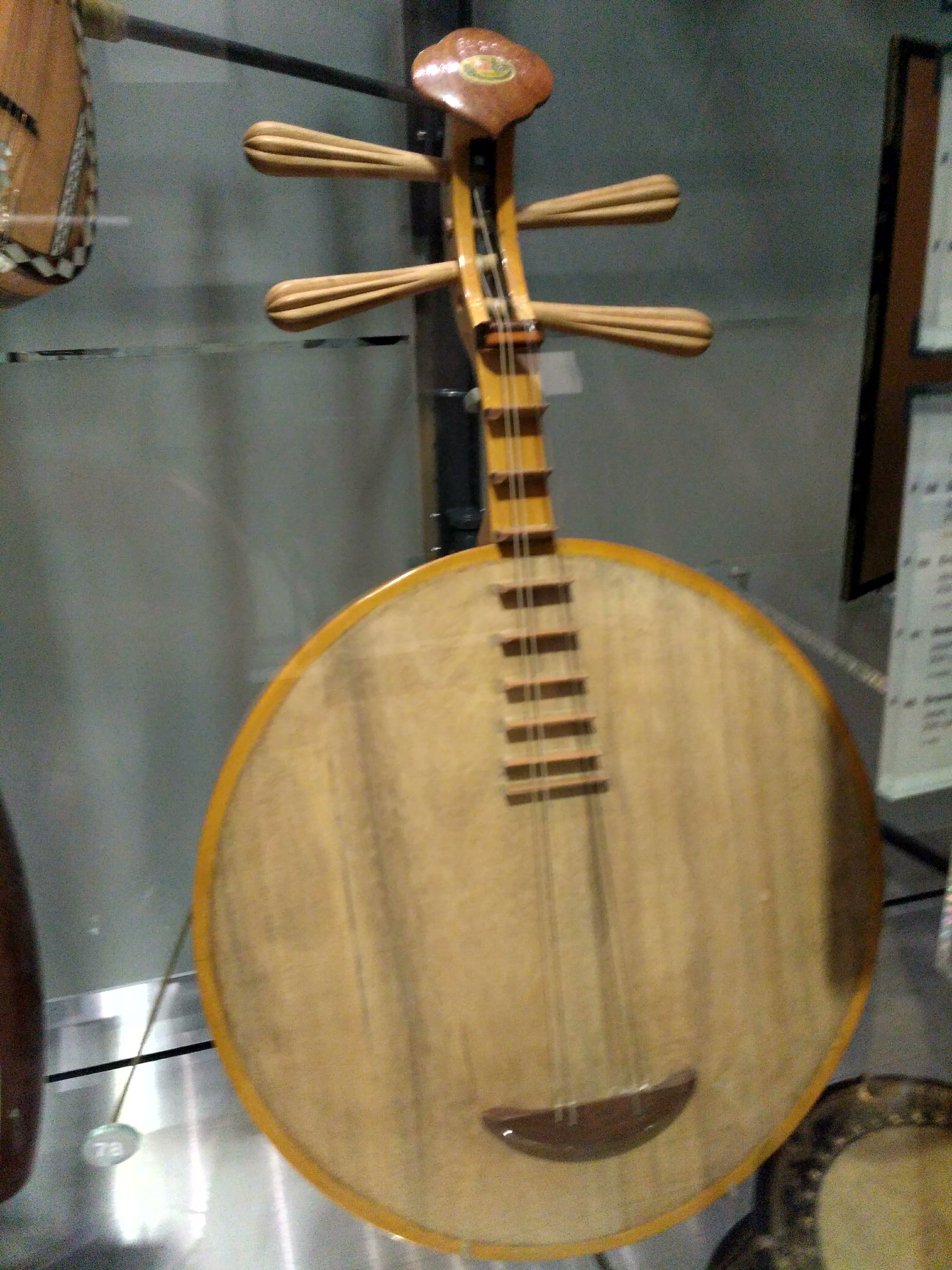
A yueqin in the Horniman museum

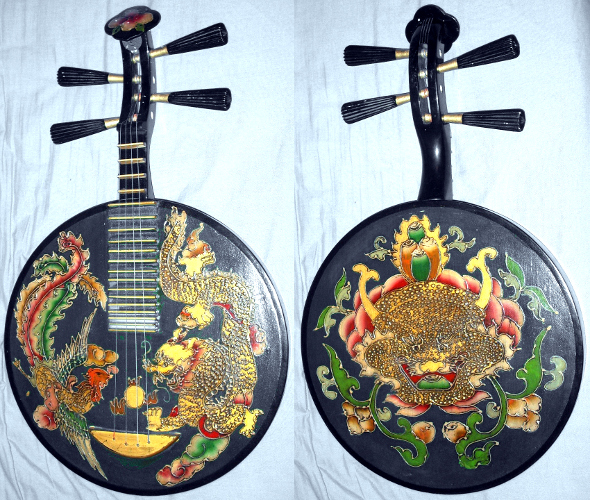
Front and back of a modern yueqin

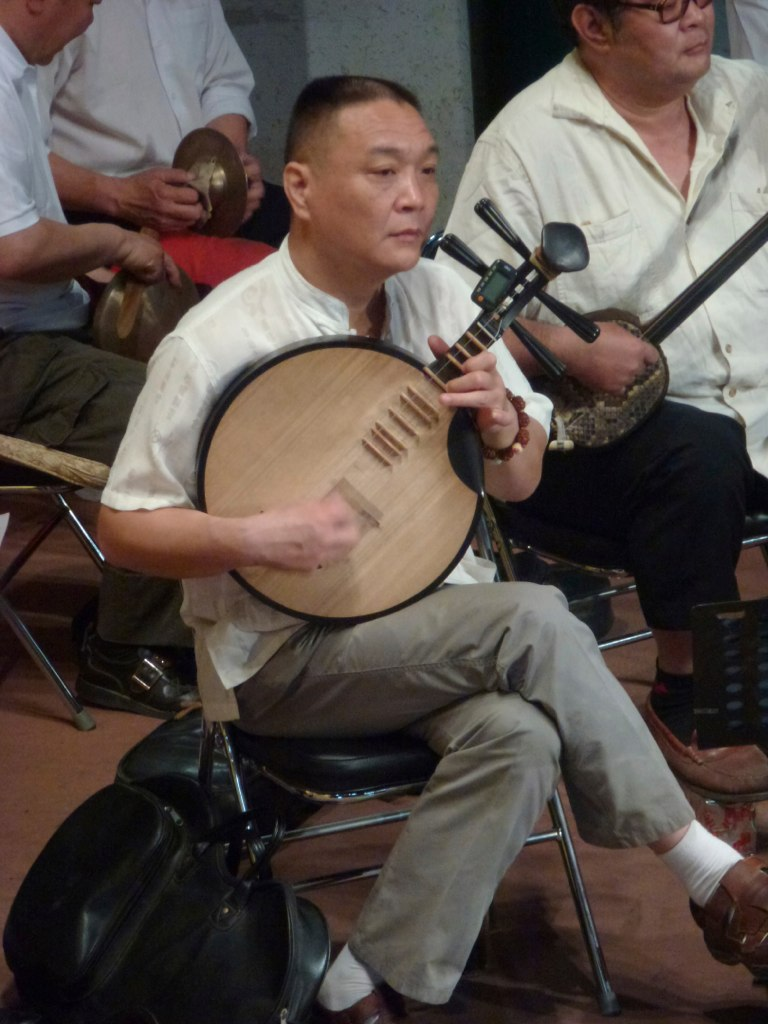
Beijing opera musician playing the yueqin

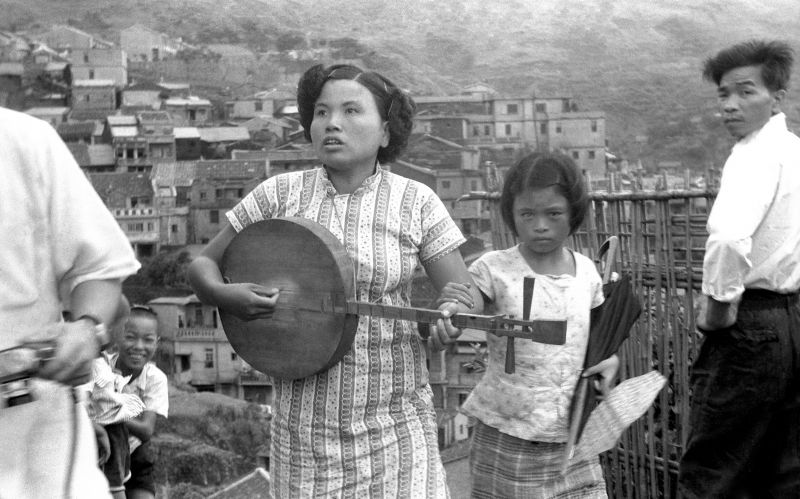
A blind Taiwanese woman playing the southern style long-necked yueqin

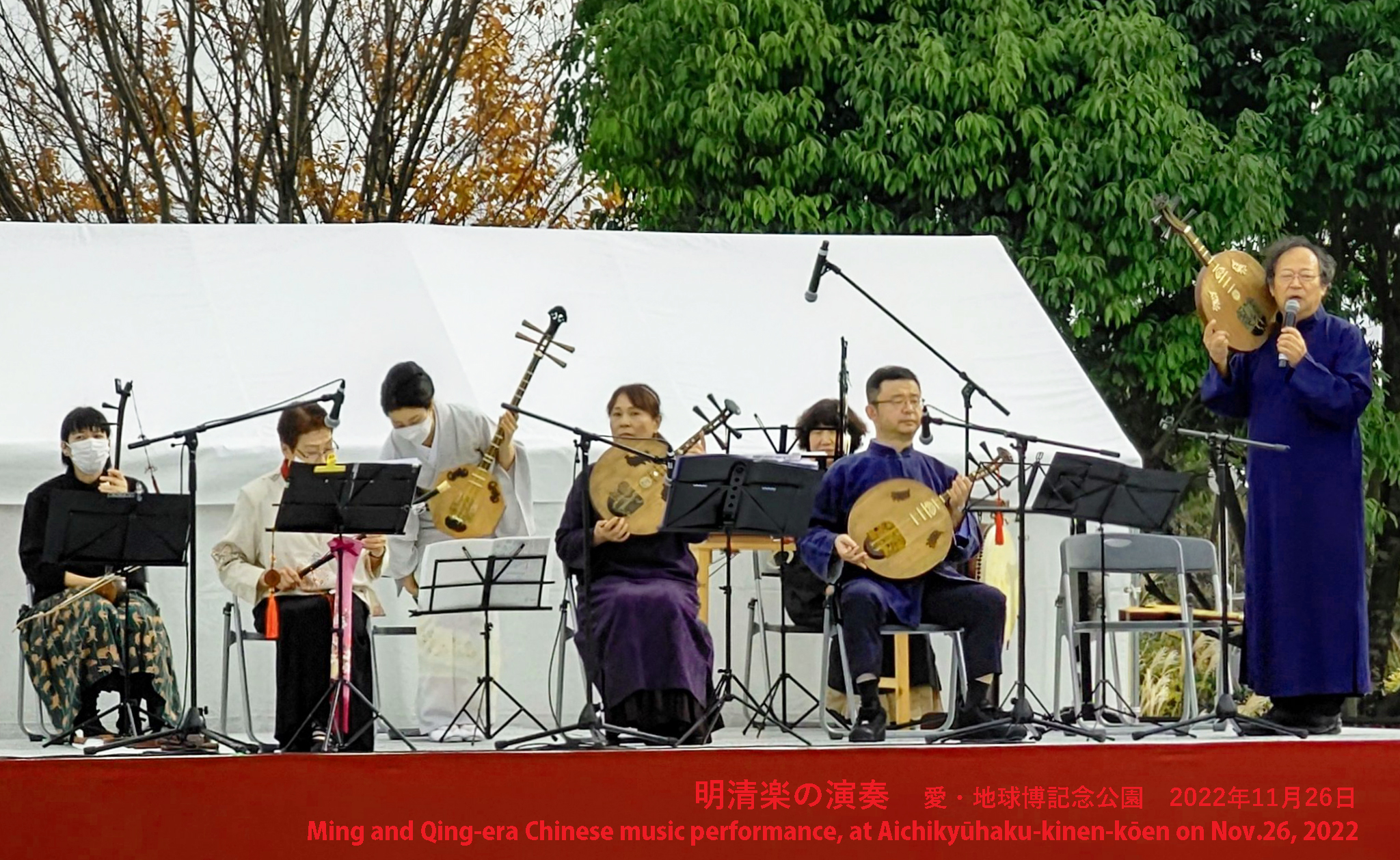
A band of MINSHINGAKU or Ming and Qing era music playing antique gekkins

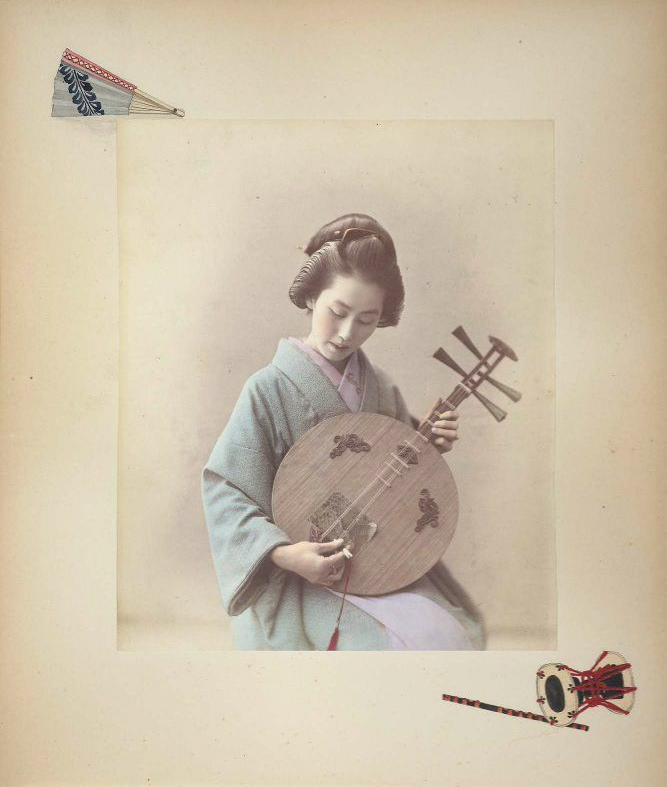
A Japanese woman playing the gekkin. Photo by Adolfo Farsari, 1886

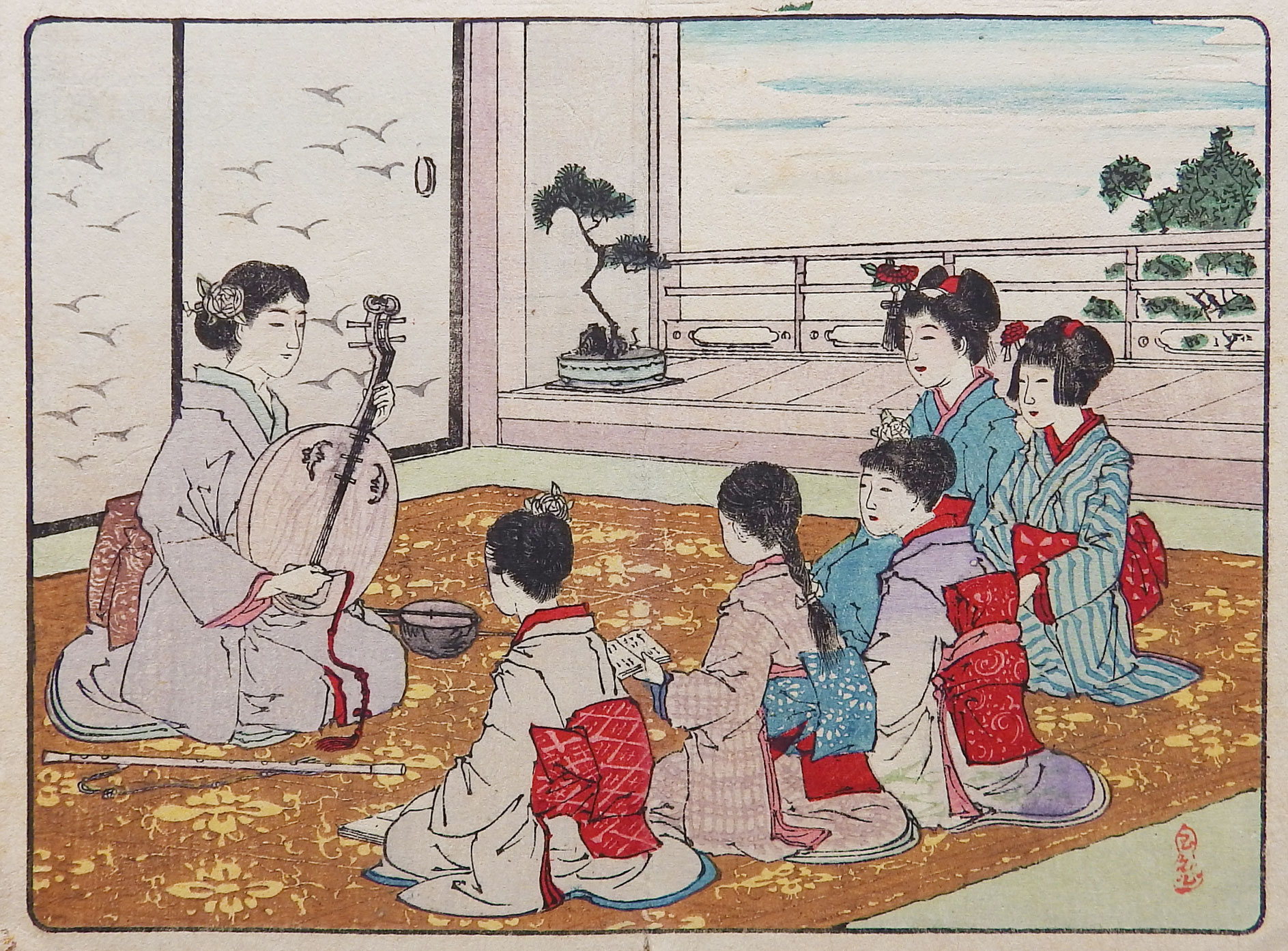
Illustration from a guide to playing the gekkin, by Nagahara Baien, 1889

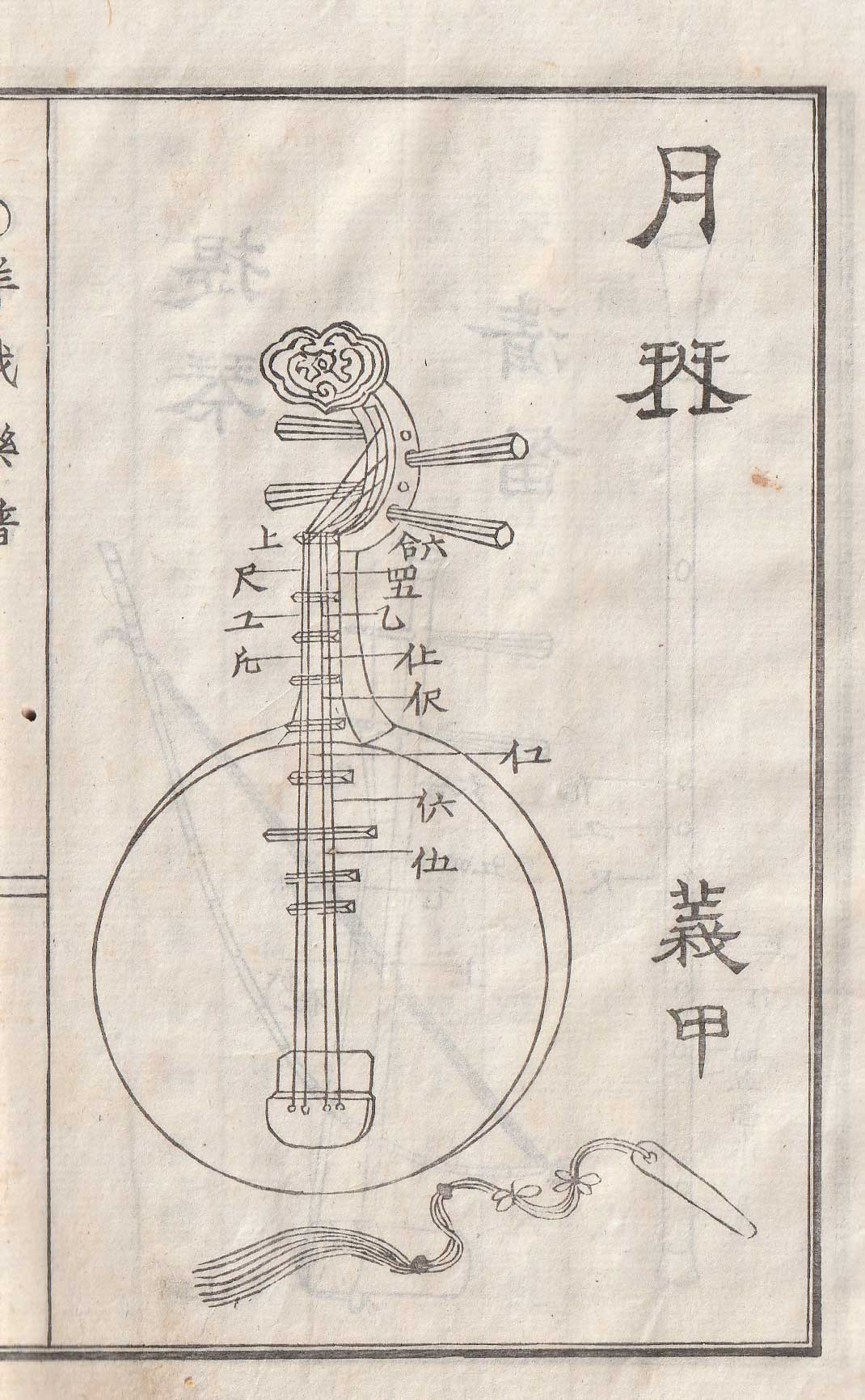
Japanese illustration of a gekkin, 1884

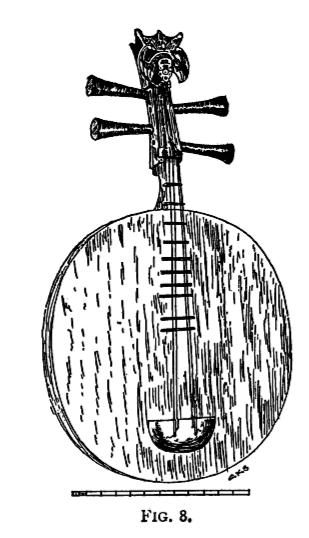
Western illustration of a yueqin, by Waldo Selden Pratt, 1907

== See also ==
- Đàn nguyệt
- Music of China
- Music of Taiwan
