= Trống cái =

Traditional Vietnamese bass drum

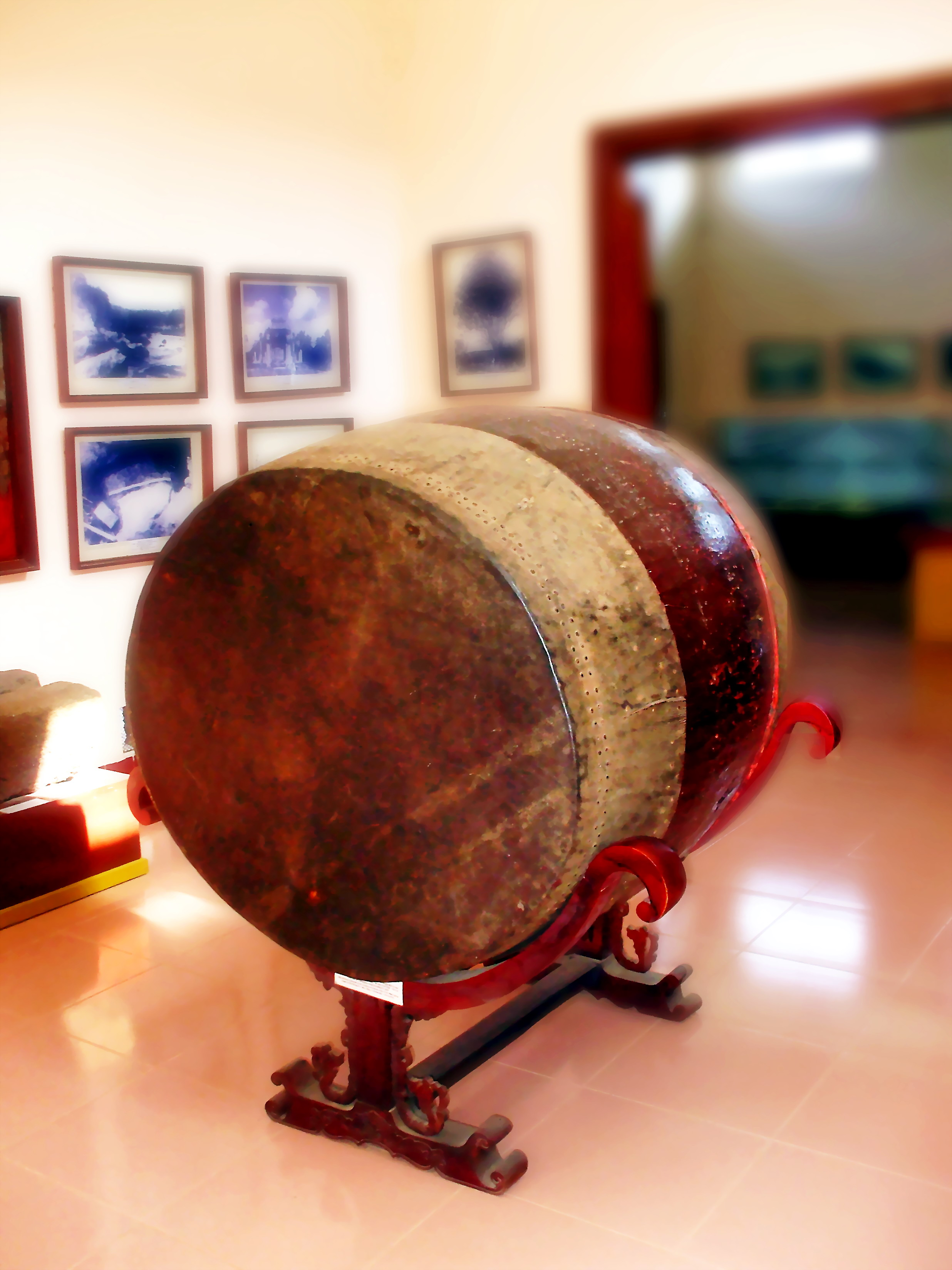
Trống cái of Tây Sơn dynasty

The trống cái or trống đại "great drum" is a traditional Vietnamese bass drum. It has a barrel-shaped wooden body, and gives a deep booming sound. The trong cai drums are typically hung on a stable frame, and in traditional drama the trống đại cổ is beaten to support the singers. It can also be carried and used at the head of a dragon dance procession.
