= Đàn nguyệt =

Vietnamese traditional instrument

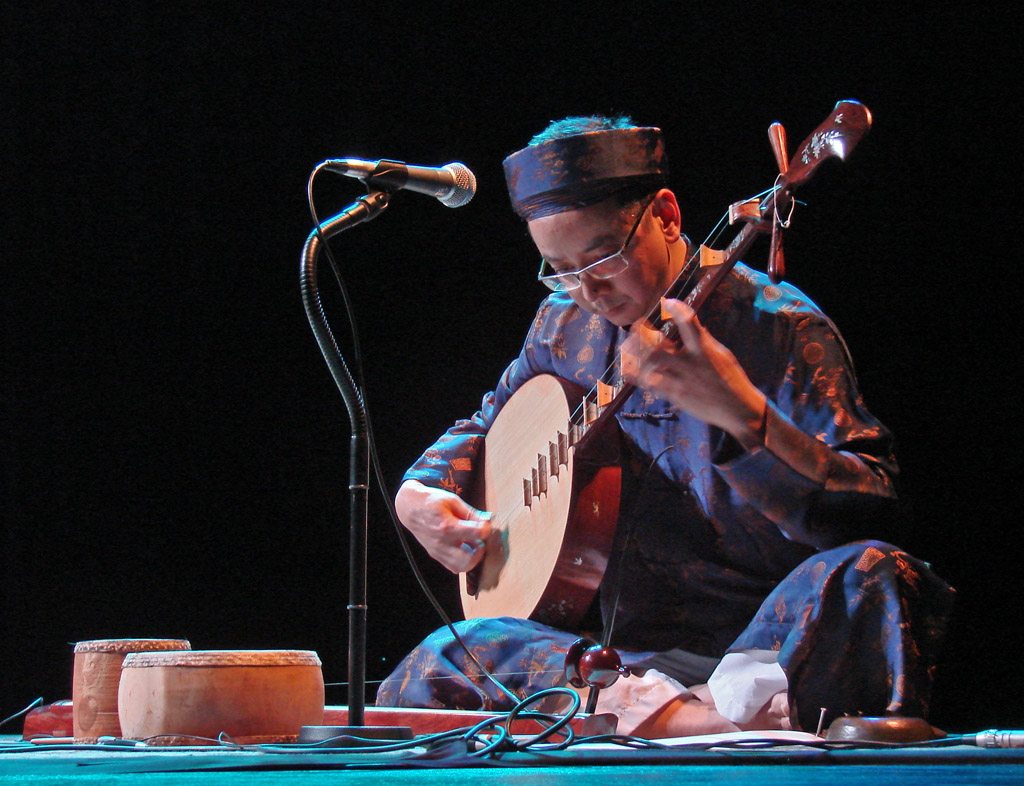
A man playing the đàn nguyệt in a performance in Paris.

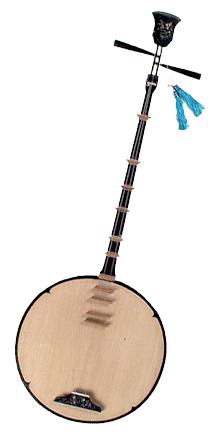
The đàn nguyệt shown here with two strings.

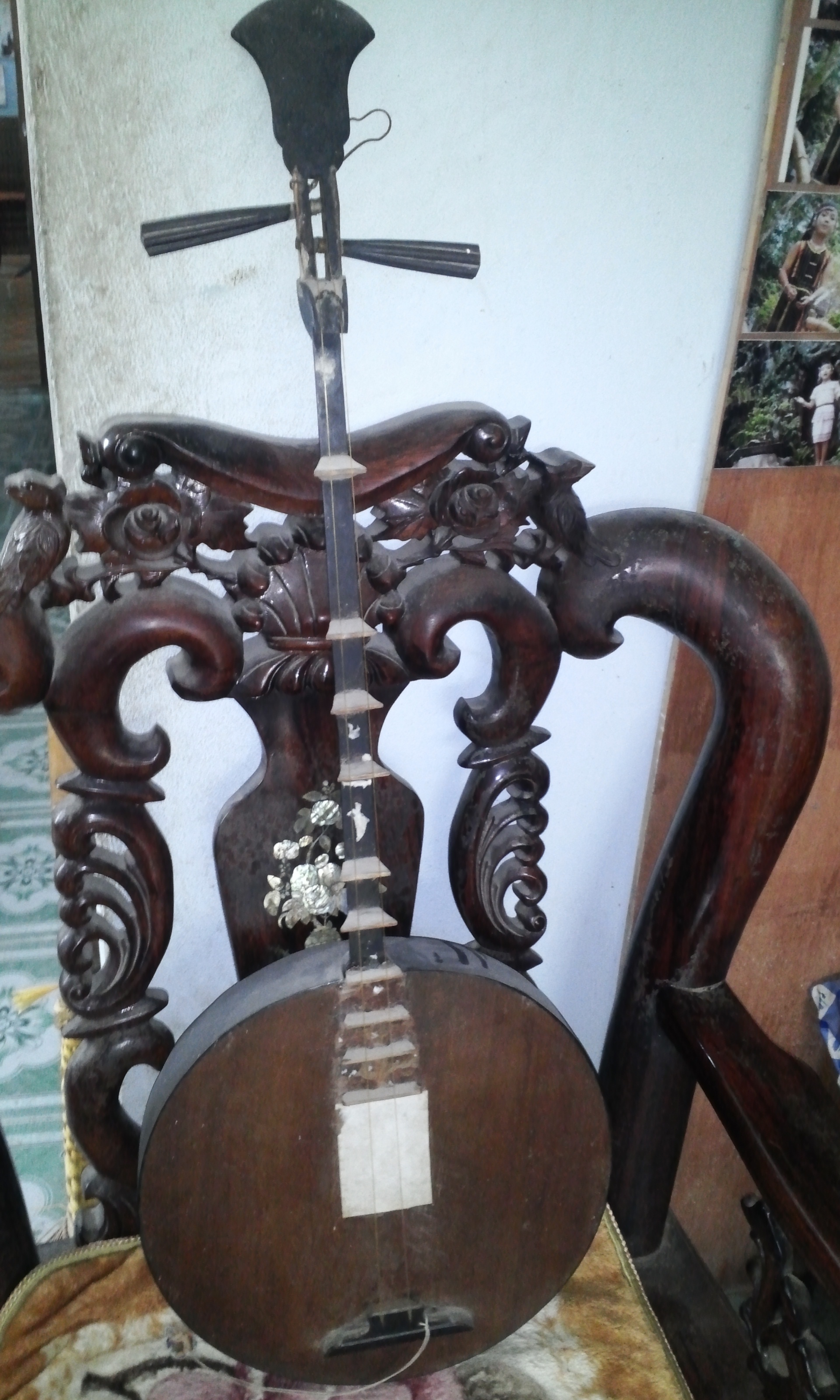
Chánh Già's đàn kìm.

The đàn nguyệt ( Vietnamese pronunciation: [ɗǎn ŋwiə̂ˀt] "moon-shaped lute", Chữ Nôm: 彈月) also called nguyệt cầm (Chữ Hán: 月琴), đàn kìm, is a two-stringed Vietnamese traditional musical instrument. It is used in folk and classical music and remains popular throughout Vietnam (although during the 20th century, many Vietnamese musicians increasingly gravitated toward the acoustic and electric guitar). It may be descended from the Ruan (Chinese: 阮; pinyin: ruǎn), a Chinese instrument.

The đàn nguyệt's strings, formerly made of twisted silk, are generally made of nylon or fishing line today. They are kept at a reasonably low tension compared to the guitar and other European plucked instruments. This, along with the instrument's raised frets, allows the important bending tones to interpret traditional Vietnamese music correctly. Such bending tones are produced by pressing the string toward the neck rather than bending to the side. The strings are generally plucked with a small plectrum; a plastic guitar pick is often used.

The instrument's standard Vietnamese name, đàn nguyệt, literally means "moon string instrument" (đàn is the generic term for "string instrument" and nguyệt means "moon"). Its alternate name, nguyệt cầm, also means "moon string instrument" (cầm meaning "string instrument" in Sino-Vietnamese, coming from the Chinese yuèqín, 月琴).

== See also ==
- Yueqin
- Music of Vietnam
- Ruan (instrument) - Chinese instrument
