= Music of Vietnam =

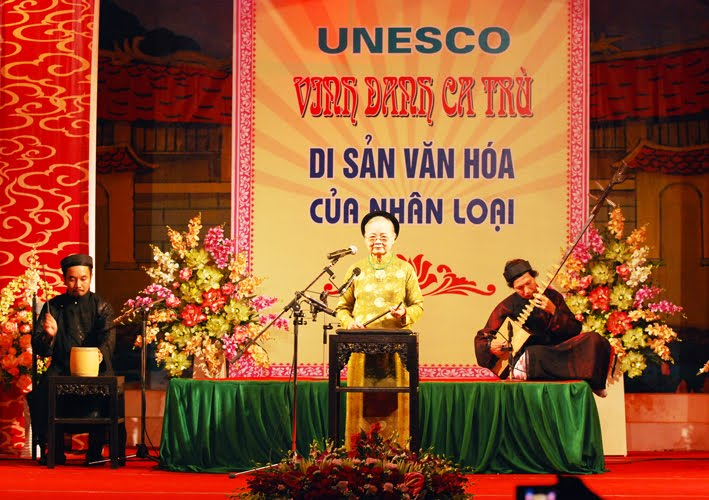
Performance of ca trù, a traditional genre of chamber music from northern Vietnam, inscribed by UNESCO as an Intangible Cultural Heritage in 2009

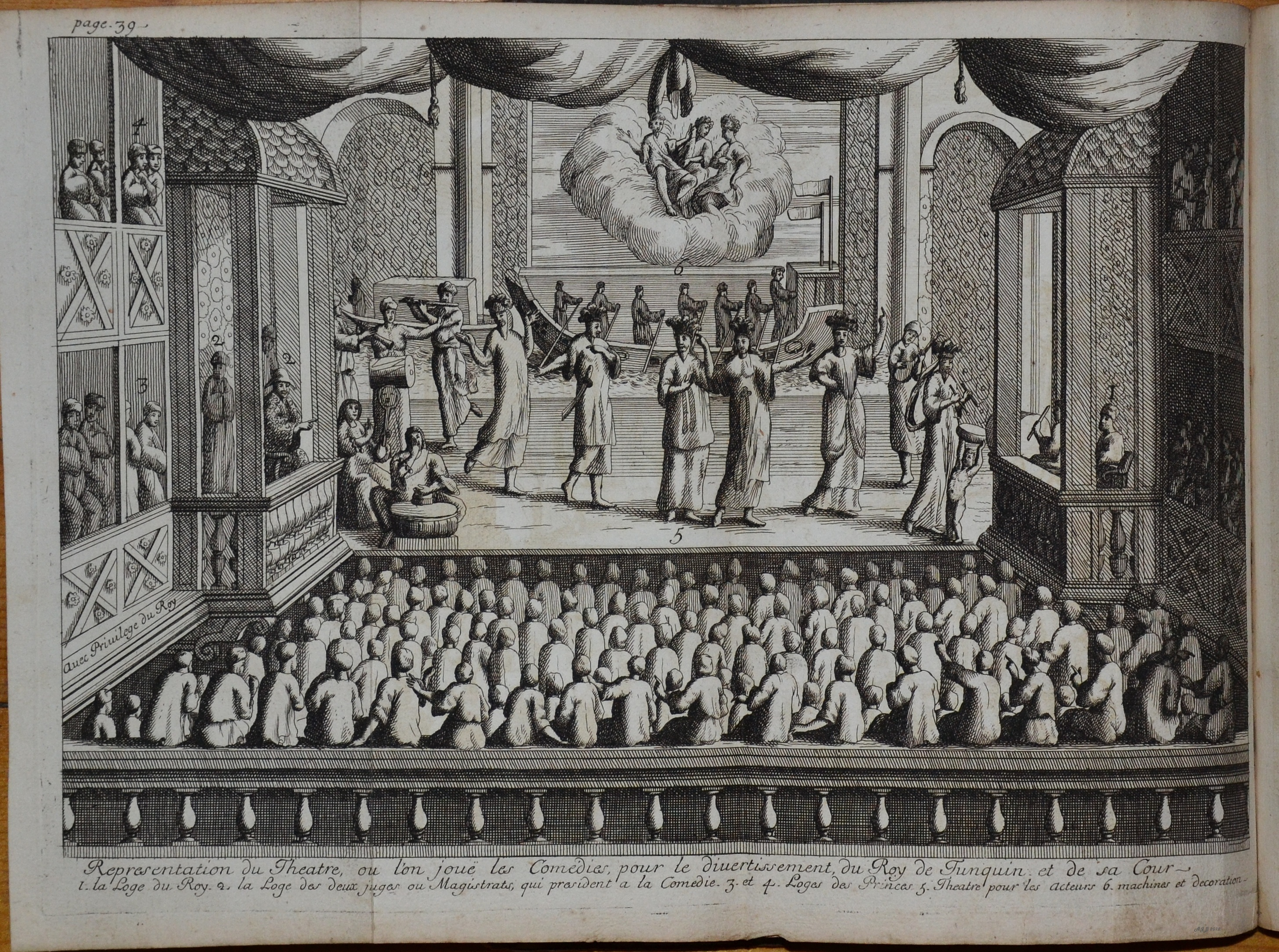
A comedy theater in Tonkin during the Revival Lê dynasty

Vietnamese music encompasses a broad range of musical traditions and styles from antiquity to the present day, and can also encompass multiple groups, such as those from Vietnam's ethnic minorities.

== History ==
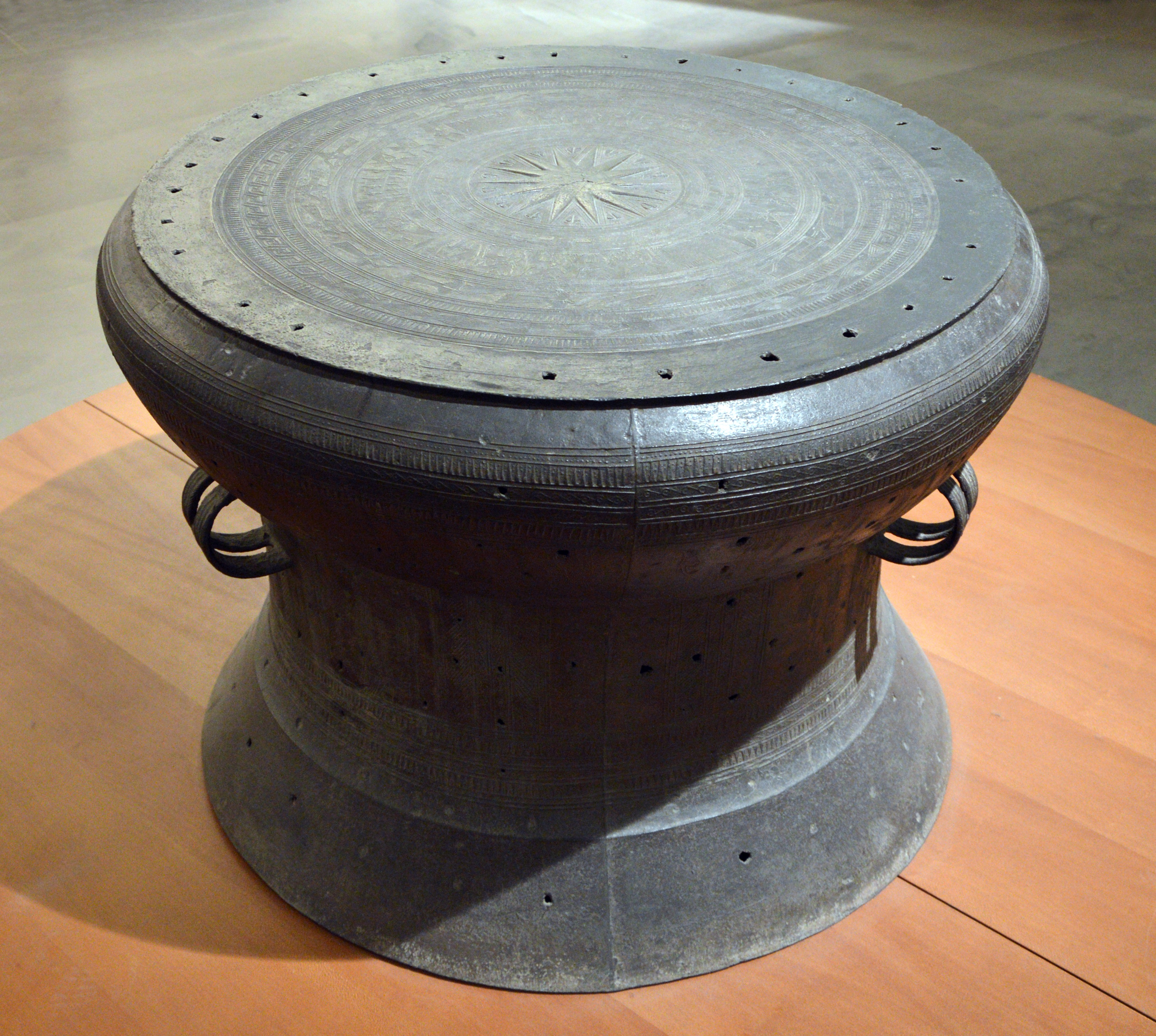
Drum from Sông Đà, Vietnam. Dong Son II culture. Mid-1st millennium BCE. Bronze.

Traditional Vietnamese music has been mainly used for religious activities, in daily life, and in traditional festivals. The music is considerably diverse due to Vietnam's ethnic population. Moreover, each of Vietnam's ethnic groups owns many unique types of musical instruments. The influence of Asian musical cultures on Vietnamese music can be seen in particular instruments such as the flutes, zithers, harps, and erhu. However, the recovery of an almost complete stringed instrument from a deer antler dated to 2,000 years old and shows clear similarities with traditional Vietnamese musical instruments indicate that these traditional instruments have ancient origins.

=== Foreign Influences ===
The traditional music of Vietnam has been heavily influenced by Chinese music, mainly in terms of musical instruments and performance styles. The introduction of American music, particularly rock and roll and pop music, has influenced the development of modern Vietnamese music.

The Vietnam War had a profound impact on Vietnamese music, inspiring many protest songs and influencing the development of modern Vietnamese music. The introduction of rock came with the use of electric guitars to create a more aggressive sound within the songs. The main genres prevalent in this period were rock, folk, and soul. Due to the war, most songs at the time were focused on the themes of peace, love, and social justice.

Before the Doi Moi Period, Vietnamese music was mainly influenced by folk music and social realism. At this period, there was the introduction of new genres like hip-hop, pop, and rock, which were mainly influenced by Western culture. The economic reforms of the Doi Moi period in the 1980s led to a relaxation of state control over the arts, allowing for greater diversity and experimentation in Vietnamese music. This period led to increased popularity and acceptance of Western music styles and genres.

After the Fall of Saigon, there was strict control over cultural expression. Many musicians were forced to move to other countries, and those who remained had to adhere to government rules. The music shifted to reflecting government propaganda, and the music scene became more uniform. Vietnamese musician Trịnh Công Sơn was sent to a foced labor "re-education camp". anti-war and anti-government.

The rise of the internet has greatly expanded the availability and diversity of music in Vietnam, allowing for greater cross-cultural influences and the development of new musical styles. This contemporary period has made Vietnamese music more diverse and experimental.

Buddhism has had a significant influence on Vietnamese music, particularly in terms of its spiritual and meditative aspects. This occurred during the medieval period.

== Royal court music ==
Royal Vietnamese court music first appeared explicitly in the historical record after a successful seaborne raid against Champa led by emperor Lý Thái Tông in 1044. Cham women were taken as singers, dancers and entertainers for the court. The chronicles recorded that a special palace for Cham women was built in 1046, then in 1060 the emperor ordered a translation of Cham songs, and incorporated Cham drum known as trống cơm into the royal band. During the 13th century, a new trend of music came from China: songs set to Chinese tunes with Vietnamese lyrics.

Nhã nhạc is the most popular form of royal court music, specifically referring to the court music played from the Trần dynasty to the last Nguyễn dynasty of Vietnam, being synthesized and developed by the Nguyễn emperors. Influenced from Ming Chinese music, it slowly emerged in the royal court in the 1430s. Along with nhã nhạc, the imperial court of Vietnam in the 19th century also had many royal dances which still exist in present times. The theme of most dances is to wish the emperor or empress longevity and the country prosperity.

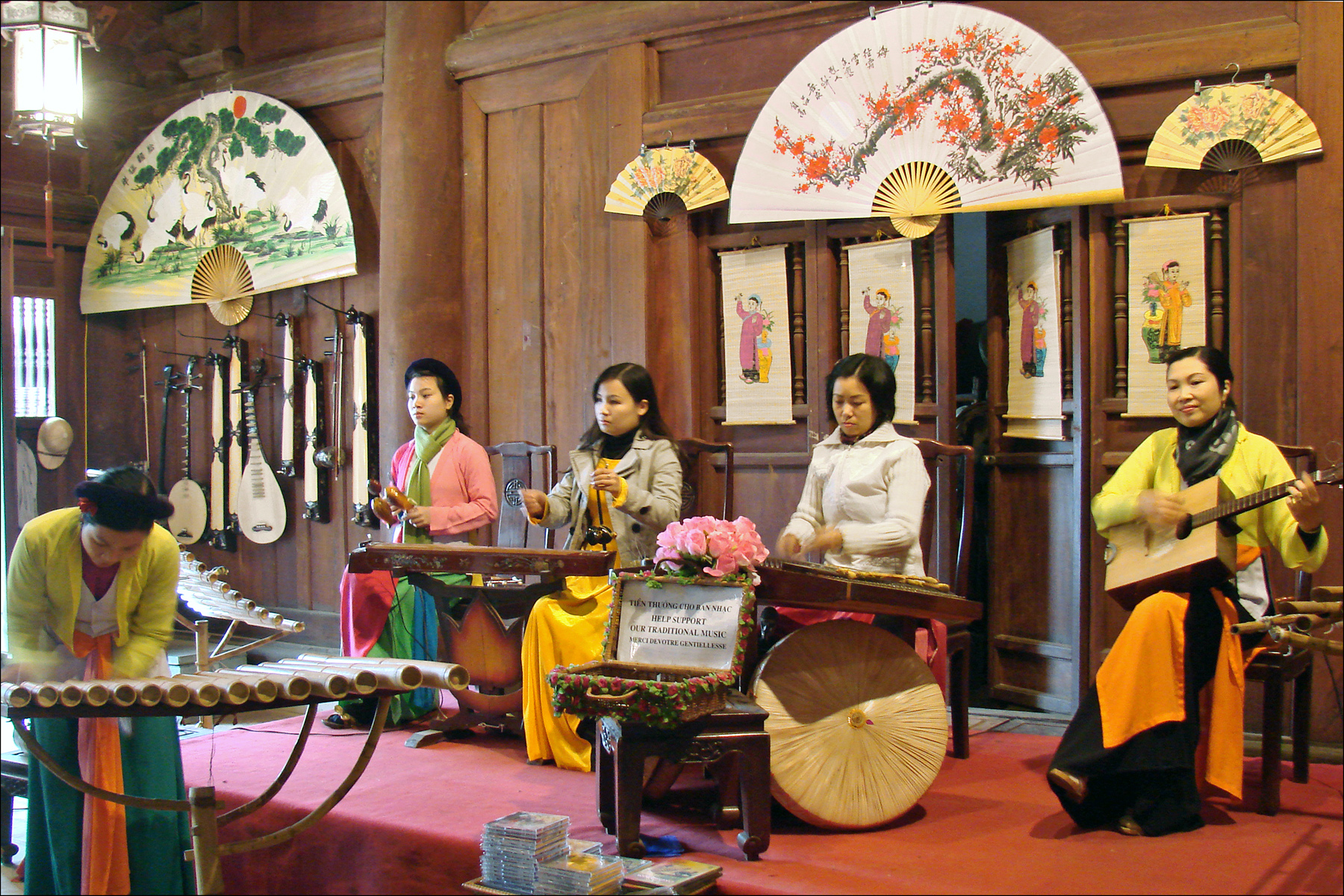
Traditional orchestra performing at the Temple of Literature, Hanoi

Classical music is also performed in honour of gods and scholars such as to Confucius in temples and shrines. These categories are defined as Nhã Nhạc ("elegant music" or "ritual and ceremonial" music), Đại nhạc ("great music"), and Tiểu nhạc ("small music") are classified as chamber music, often for entertainment for the ruler. In Vietnamese traditional dance, court dances were encompassed văn vũ (civil servant dance) and võ vũ (military dance).

== Dilettante music ==
Dilettante music is a genre of chamber music in the traditional music of southern Vietnam. Its instrumentation resembles that of the ca Huế style. Sometimes, modified versions of European instruments like the guitar, violin, and the steel guitar are also included. Vọng cổ ( "Folk sound") is one of the more popular tài tử melodies, and was composed in 1919 by songwriter Mr Sáu Lầu, of Bạc Liêu, in southern Vietnam.

== Folk music ==
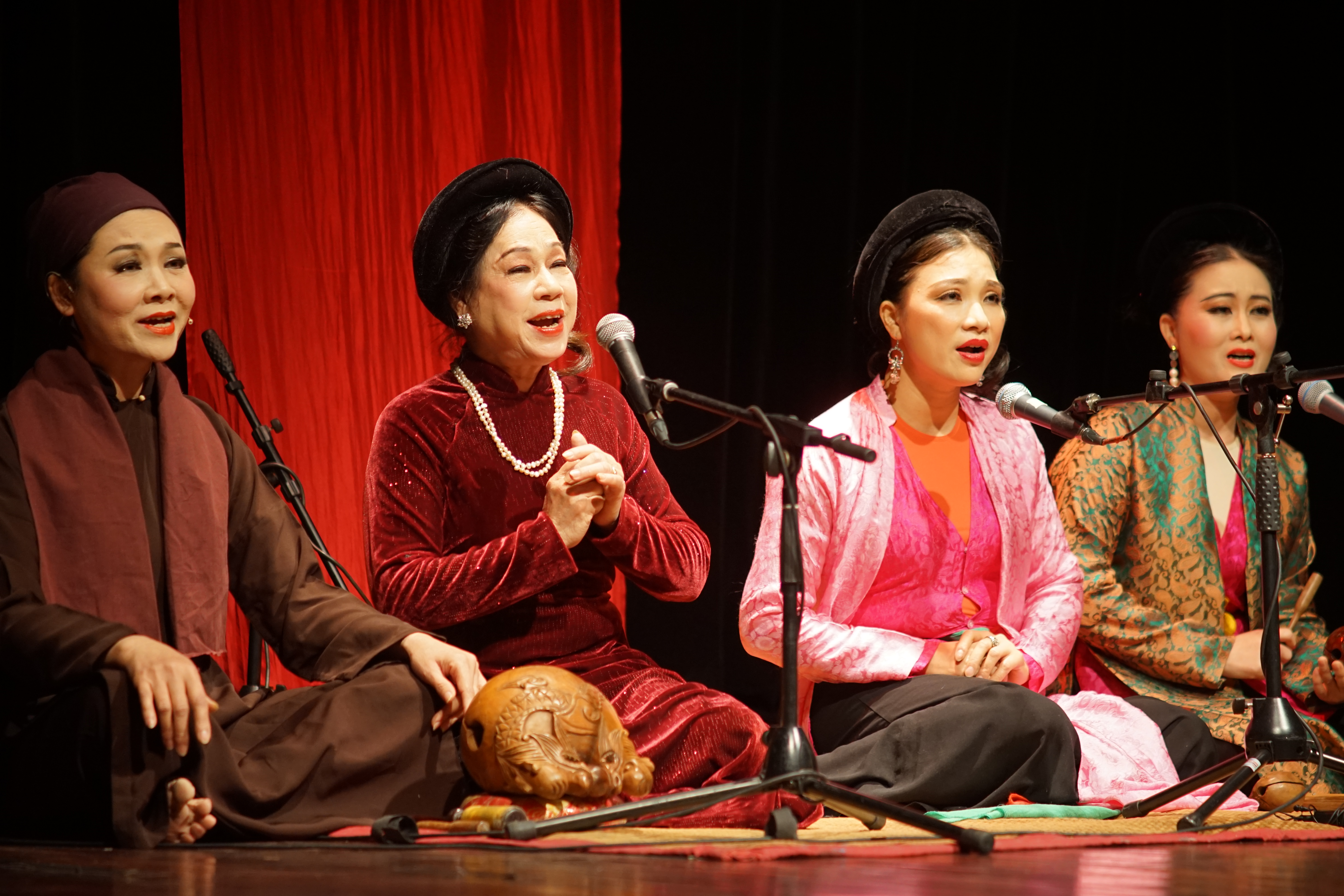
Singers in the traditional music group Đông Kinh cổ nhạc

Vietnamese folk music is extremely diverse and includes various regional dân ca, quan họ, ca trù, hát tuồng, hát chèo, hát chầu văn, hò, hát xẩm, hát xoan, bài chòi, đờn ca tài tử, ca Huế and trống quân, among other forms.

=== Chèo ===
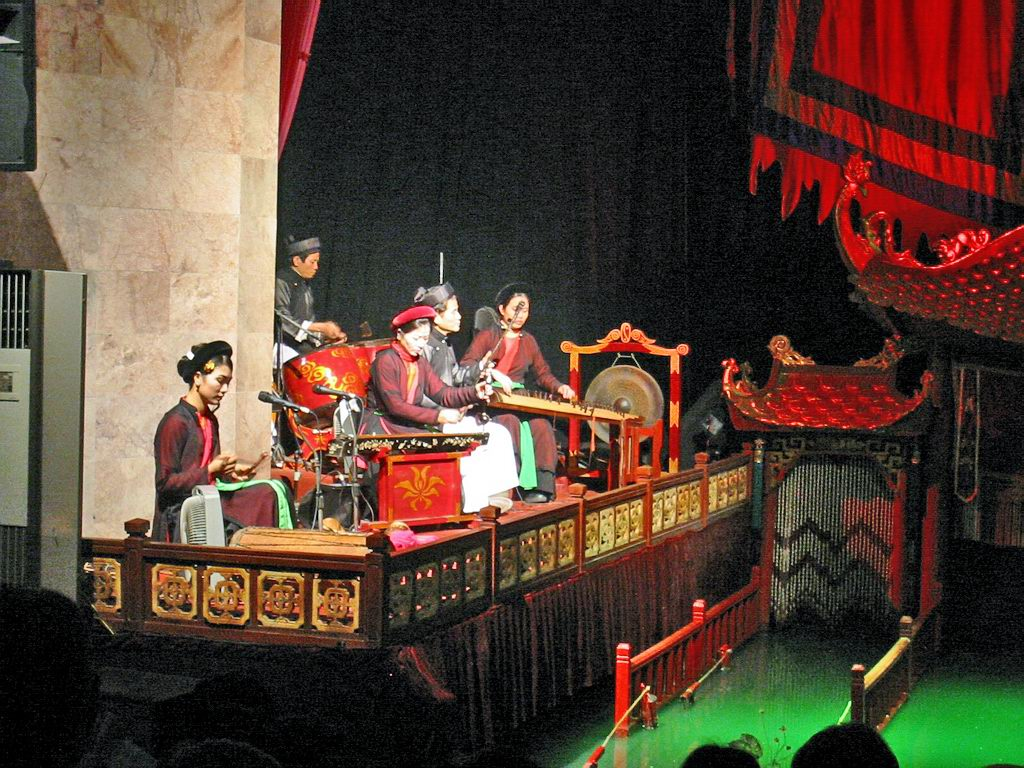
Chèo orchestra accompanies the performance of water puppetry

Chèo is a form of generally satirical musical theatre, often encompassing dance, traditionally performed by peasants in northern Vietnam. It is usually performed outdoors by semi-amateur touring groups, stereotypically in a village square or the courtyard of a public building, although today it is also increasingly performed indoors and by professional performers.

=== Xẩm ===
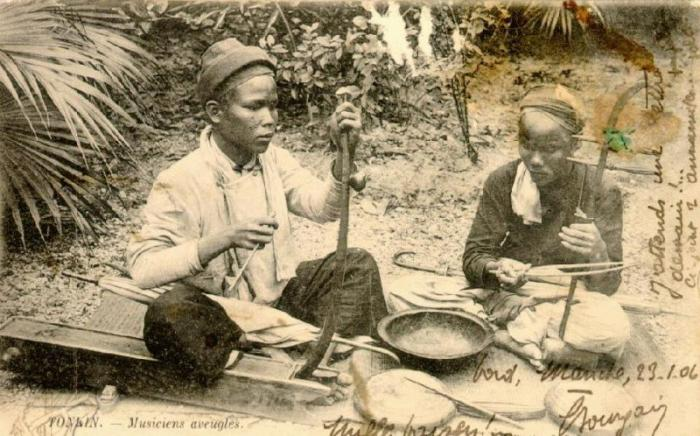
Blind artists performing xẩm

Xẩm or Hát xẩm (Xẩm singing) is a type of Vietnamese folk music which was popular in the Northern region of Vietnam but is considered nowadays an endangered form of traditional music in Vietnam. In the dynastic time, xẩm was performed by blind artists who wandered from town to town and earned their living by singing in common places.

=== Quan họ ===
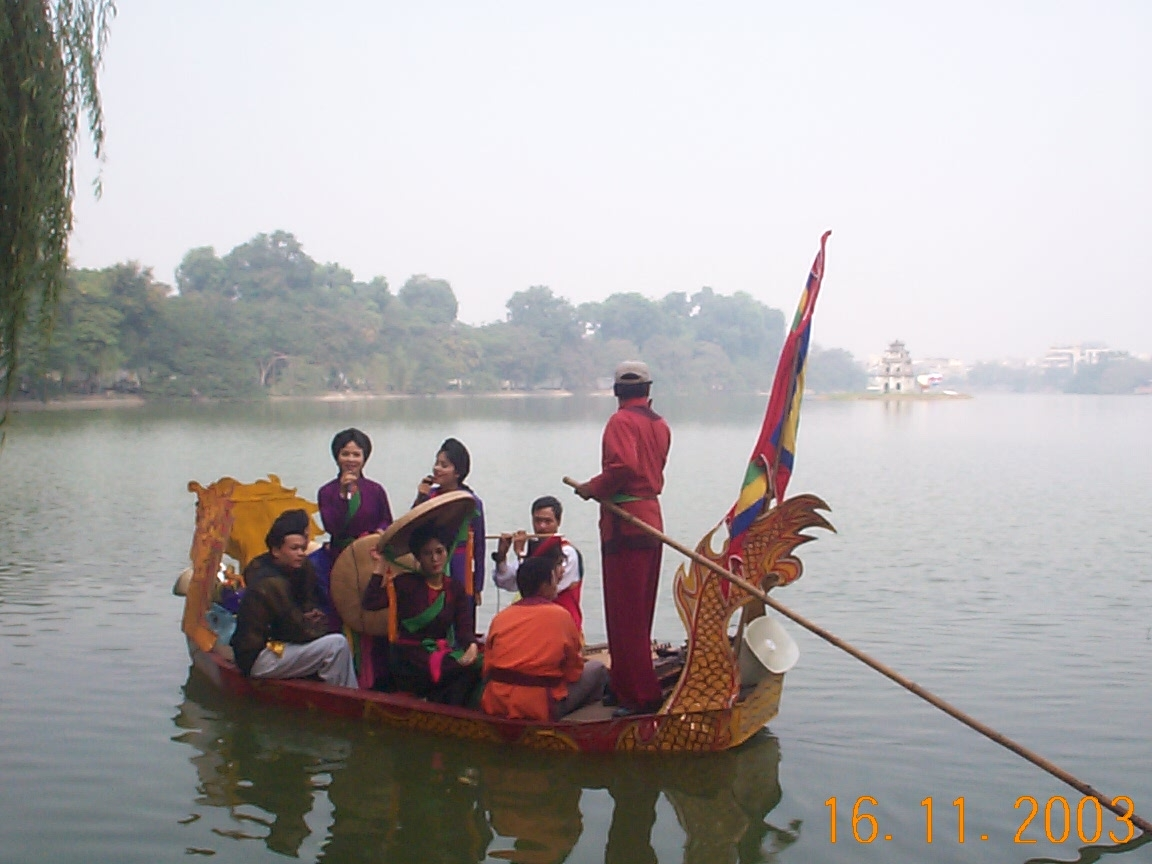
Singing quan họ at Hoàn Kiếm Lake

Quan họ (alternate singing) is popular in Hà Bắc (divided into nowadays Bắc Ninh and Bắc Giang provinces) and across Vietnam; numerous variations exist, especially in the Northern provinces. Sung a cappella, quan họ is improvised and is used in courtship rituals.

=== Chầu văn ===
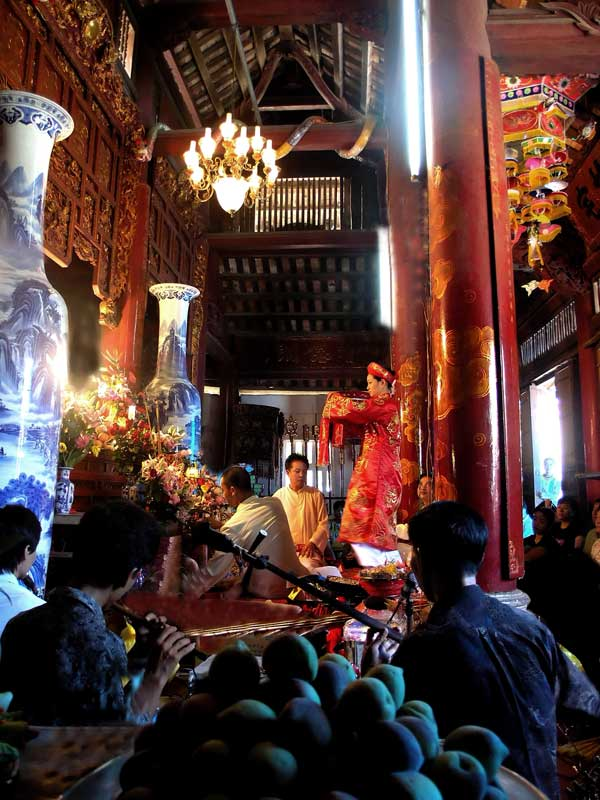
Singing chầu văn in the lên đồng ritual

Chầu văn or hát văn is a spiritual form of music used to invoke spirits during ceremonies. It is highly rhythmic and trance-oriented. Before 1986, the Vietnamese government repressed hát chầu văn and other forms of religious expression. It has since been revived by musicians like Phạm Văn Tỵ.

=== Nhạc dân tộc cải biên ===
Nhạc dân tộc cải biên is a modern form of Vietnamese folk music which arose in the 1950s after the founding of the Hanoi Conservatory of Music in 1956. This development involved writing traditional music using Western musical notation, while Western elements of harmony and instrumentation were added. Nhạc dân tộc cải biên is often criticized by purists for its watered-down approach to traditional sounds.

=== Ca trù ===
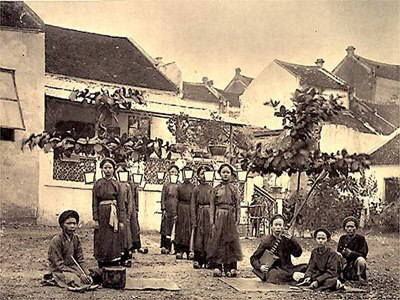
Band performances Ca trù

Ca trù (also hát ả đào) is a complex form of musical poetry. Most singers are women, and the genre has been revived since the communist government loosened its repression in the late 1980s, when it was associated with prostitution.

Ca trù, which has many forms, is thought to have originated in the imperial palace, eventually moving predominantly into performances at communal houses for scholars and other members of the elite (this is the type of ca trù most widely known). It can be referred to as a Korean gisaeng-type of entertainment where women, trained in music and poetry, entertained rich and powerful men.

=== Cải lương ===
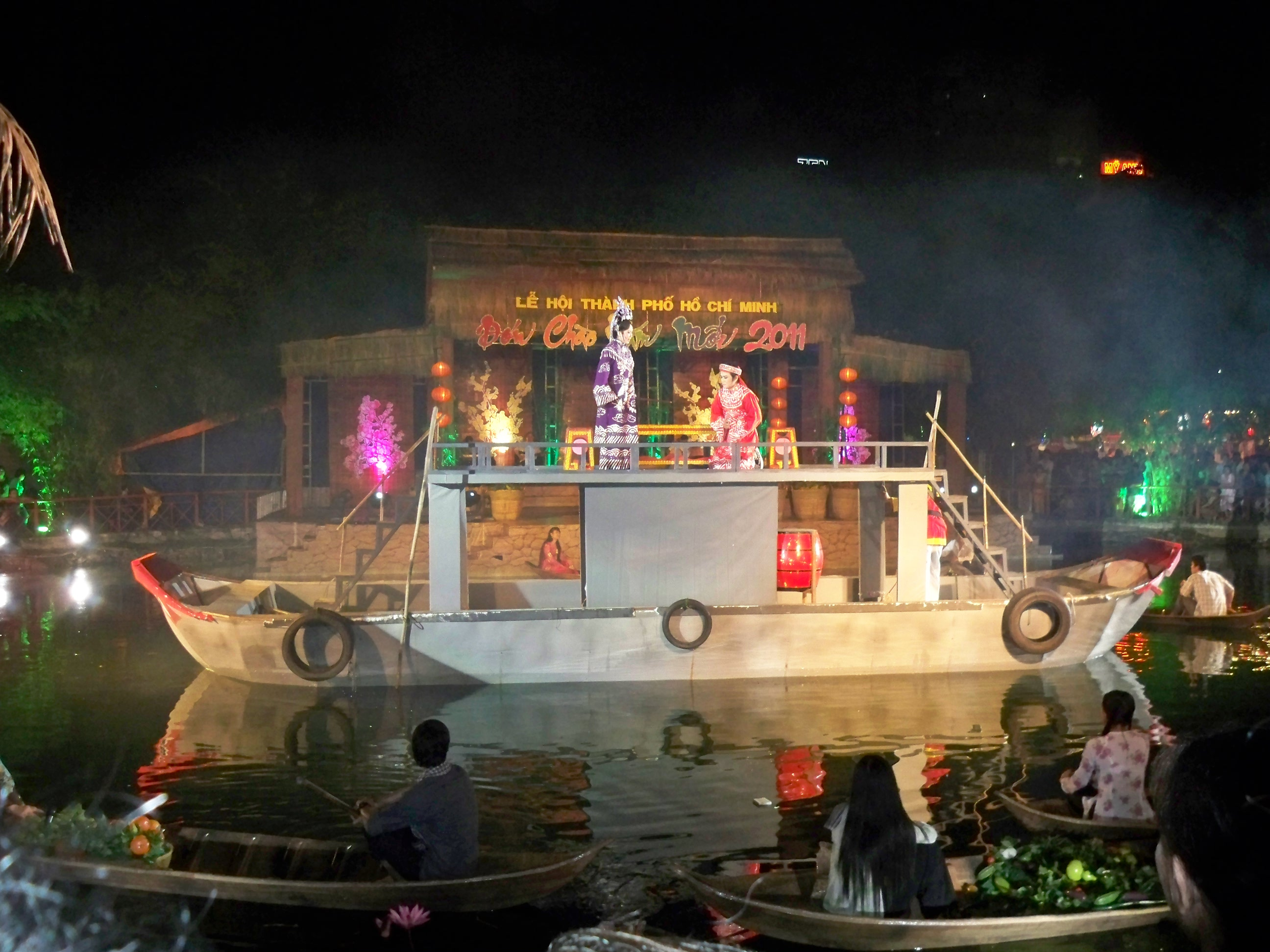
Excerpts from reformed salary Tự đức dâng roi

Cải lương originated in Southern Vietnam in the early 20th century and blossomed in the 1930s as a theatre of the middle class during the country's French colonial period. Cải lương is now promoted as a national theatrical form. Unlike the other folk forms, it continued to prove popular with the masses as late as the 1970s and the 1980s, although it is now in decline.

Cải lương can be compared to a sort of play with the added aspect of Vọng cổ. This term literally means "nostalgia for the past", it is a special type of singing with the background music often being the đàn tranh zither or the đàn ghi-ta (Vietnamized guitar). In a typical cải lương play, the actresses and actors would use a combination of regular spoken dialogue and vọng cổ to express their thoughts and emotions.

=== Tuồng ===
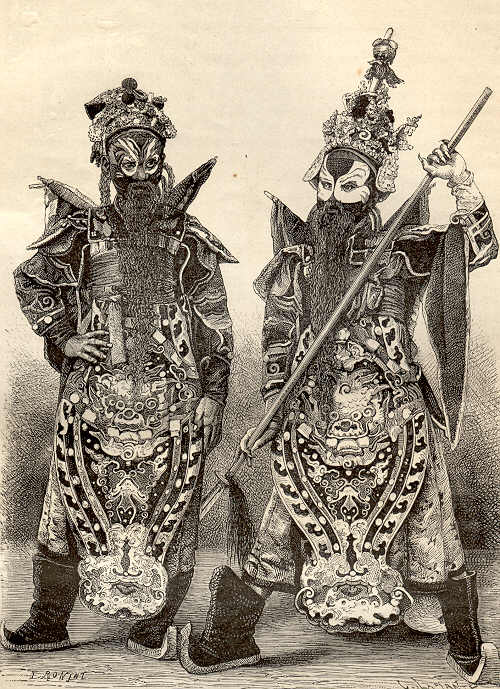
Costumes as warlords for Tuồng (Hát Bội) in Huế in 1874

Tuồng also known as hát tuồng or hát bội is a form of Vietnamese theatre. Hát tuồng is often referred to as classical Vietnamese opera influenced by Chinese opera.

=== Hò ===
Hò can be thought of as the southern style of Quan họ. It is improvisational and is typically sung as dialogue between a man and woman. Common themes include love, courtship, the countryside, etc. "Hò" is popular in Cần Thơ - Vietnam.

=== Ritual music ===
- Nhạc lễ - court music

=== Traditional musical instruments ===
- Đàn bầu (monochord zither)
- Đàn gáo (two-stringed fiddle with coconut body, from Chinese yehu)
- Đàn nguyệt (two-stringed fretted moon lute, from Chinese yueqin)
- Đàn nhị (two-stringed fiddle with hardwood body, from Chinese erhu)
- Đàn sến (two-string fretted flower lute, from Chinese Chaozhou qinqin)
- Đàn tam (fretless lute with snakeskin-covered body and three strings from Chinese sanxian)
- Đàn tam thập lục (hammered dulcimer from Chinese yangqin)
- Đàn tranh (long zither from Chinese guzheng)
- Đàn tỳ bà (pear-shaped four-stringed lute from Chinese pipa)
- Kèn bầu (oboe from Chinese suona)
- T'rưng (bamboo xylophone)
- K'ni (also spelled k'ny or k'ný) - one-string vertical fiddle with a resonating disc that is held in the player's mouth; played by the Jarai people of the Central Highlands

== Classical music ==
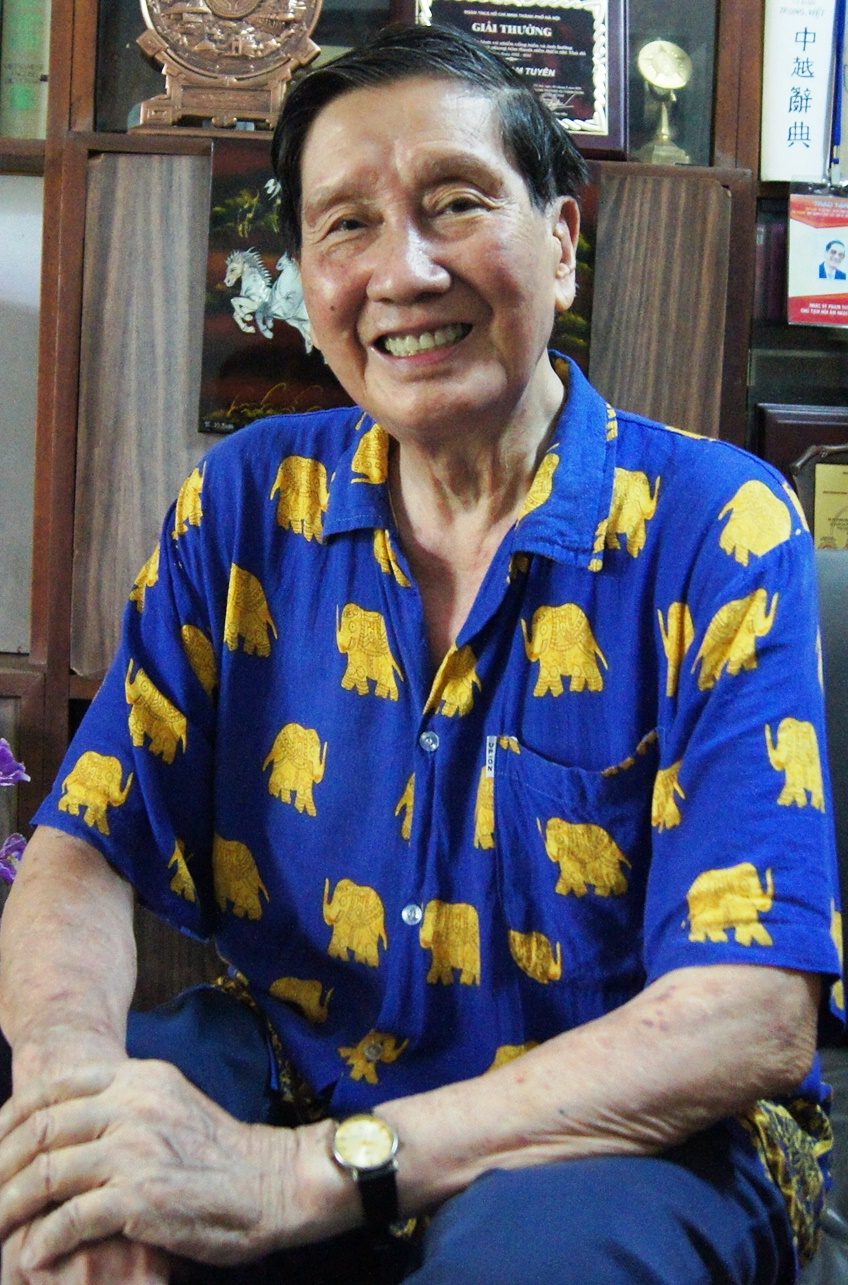
Phạm Tuyên was one of the representatives of Classical music

Vietnamese composers also followed Western classical music, such as Cô Sao by Đỗ Nhuận, considered as the first Vietnamese opera. Hoàng Vân signed Thành Đồng Tổ Quốc, in 1960, considered as the first Vietnamese symphonie, and Chị Sứ as the first Vietnamese ballet in 1968, as well as the dozen of Choir with symphonic orchestra among his hundred famous patriotic tunes. Nguyễn Văn Quỳ also wrote 9 sonatas for violin and piano, following his French music studies and Vietnamese traditions. Phạm Duy also wrote classical compositions mixed with Vietnamese folk music.

== Red music ==
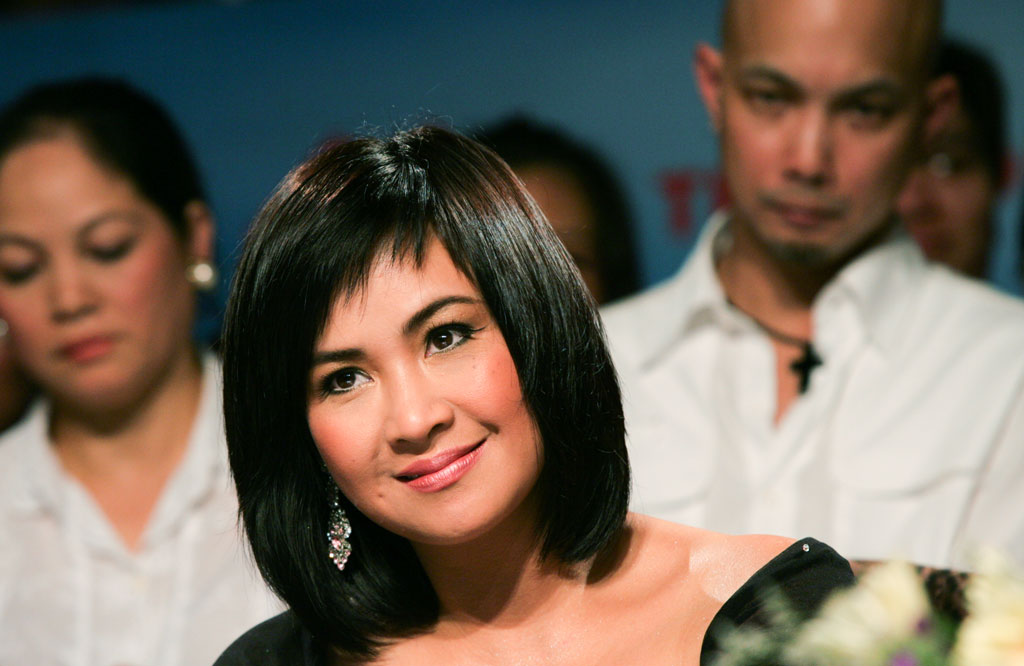
Thanh Lam was one of the representatives of Red music

Red music (Nhạc đỏ) is the common name of the revolutionary music (nhạc cách mạng) genre in Vietnam. This genre of music began soon after the beginning of the 20th century during the French colonial period, advocating for independence, socialism and anti-colonialism. Red Music was later strongly promoted across North Vietnam during the War, to urge Northerners to achieve reunification under the Communist Party of Vietnam and fight against the "American imperialist puppet" in South Vietnam. Other forms of non-traditional, non-Revolutionary music and culture in the North, like Vietnamese popular music and Western music and culture, were banned, being labelled as "counter-revolutionary", "bourgeois", or "capitalist".

== Yellow music ==
Yellow music (Nhạc vàng) in Vietnam has two meanings. The first meaning is the lyrical and romantic music from pre-war, post-development in southern Vietnam in the period 1954s-1975s and later overseas as well as in the country after Đổi Mới, influenced by music of South Vietnam 1975s. The second meaning is the common name of popular music that was formed in the late 1950s in South Vietnam, using many different melodies such as bolero, enka, rumba, tango, ballade, mambo, chachacha,...

Ballad and bolero music still remains one of the most popular genres of slow-tempo Vietnamese music, especially for karaoke sessions or for easy listening.

== Overseas music ==
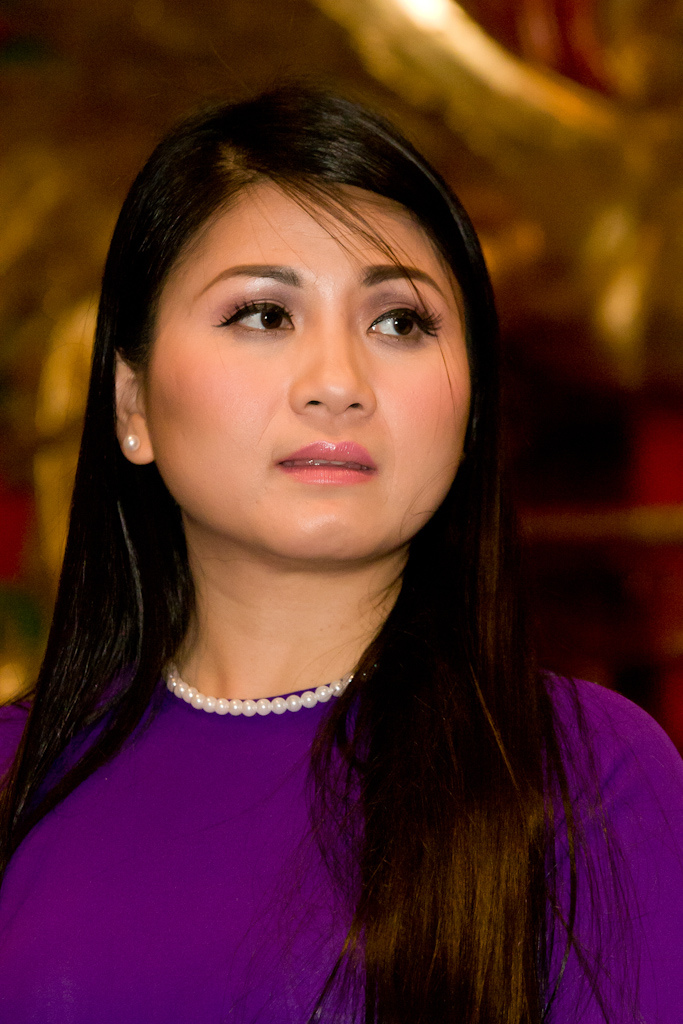
Tâm Đoan was one of the representatives of Overseas music

Overseas music also called Vietnamese diaspora music, refers to the Vietnamese music brought overseas, especially to the United States and France by the forced migration of Vietnamese artists after the Fall of Saigon in 1975.

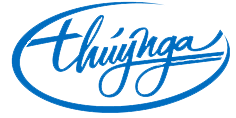
Thúy Nga Productions was one of the record label biggest of Overseas

Since the Đổi Mới economic reformation began in 1986, an increasing number of foreign tourists have visited Vietnam, constructing a new dimension to the musical life of the country. Many hotels and restaurants have hired musicians who played traditional Vietnamese music to entertain their new customers. Spectacles of musical performances present tourists with some aspects of the musical culture of Vietnam, though musicians also play westernized folk music to cater to foreigners' tastes because of economic necessity. The cultural industry in Vietnam shows a positive tendency towards prosperity. Some excellent musical festivals have taken place, namely the Lullaby Festival, modernized Theater Festival, Theater Song contest, the Traditional Theater Festival, etc. A considerable amount of film music has been composed to enrich the film industry in Vietnam. Furthermore, the Institute of Musicology has played an important role in the preservation and academic research of Vietnamese music. The institute is well using modern technology to help restore and preserve Vietnamese music and songs on compact discs for the longer and better conservation of sound documents. Stored in the Sound Archives of the Institute of Musicology are 8,850 pieces of instrumental music and nearly 18,000 folk songs performed by more or less 2,000 performers. Thousands of technology products in the form of an audio CD, video CD, and videotapes featuring performances on folk music have been released.

== 1940s–1980s, singer-songwriters ==
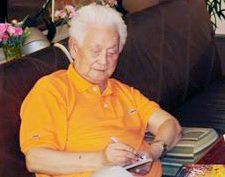
Songwriter Phạm Duy (1920–2013)

The Vietnam War, the consequent Fall of Saigon, and the plight of Vietnamese refugees gave rise to a collection of musical pieces that have become "classical" anthems for Vietnamese people both in Vietnam and abroad. Notable writers include Phạm Duy and Trịnh Công Sơn. Singers include Thái Thanh, Khánh Ly and Lệ Thu.

Many of these composers, in the North, also contributed Vietnamese revolutionary songs, known as nhạc đỏ "Red Music": Lưu Hữu Phước, Văn Cao, Hoàng Vân, Nguyễn Xuân Khoát...

== Contemporary music ==
=== V-pop ===
The embrace of modern pop music culture has increased, as each new generation of people in Vietnam has become more exposed to and influenced by Westernized music, along with the fashion styles of Hong Kong, Taiwan, Japan, and South Korea. Musical production has improved and expanded over the years as visiting performers and organizers from other countries have helped to stimulate the Vietnamese entertainment industry. Such performances include international stages like the Asia Music Festival in South Korea where popular Vietnamese singers such as Mỹ Linh, Mỹ Tâm, Hồ Ngọc Hà, Lam Trường, Sơn Tùng M-TP and others have performed along with other singers from different Asian countries. During the recent years, such as 2006 and beyond, Vietnamese pop music has tremendously improved from years past. Vietnamese music has been able to widen its reach to audiences nationally and also overseas. There are many famous underground artists such as Andree Right Hand, Big Daddy, Shadow P (all featured in a popular song called Để anh được yêu) or Lil' Knight and countless others who have risen to fame through the Internet. In addition, there are also other singers that have gone mainstream, such as M4U, Hồ Ngọc Hà, Bảo Thy, Wanbi Tuấn Anh, Khổng Tú Quỳnh, Radio Band, etc. There are also amateur singers whose songs have been hits in Vietnam, such as Khởi My, Tóc Tiên, Văn Mai Hương,... These singers tend to view singing as a hobby, therefore not being labeled as mainstream artists. Overall, the quality of recording and the style of music videos in Vietnam has improved a lot compared to the past years due to many private productions and also overseas Vietnamese coming back to produce a combination of Western and Vietnamese music.

=== Rock and heavy metal ===
Introduced by American soldiers, rock and roll was popular in Saigon during the Vietnam War. This genre has developed strongly in the South and has spread out over the North region after the rise of Bức Tường in the 90s. Popular songs during the Vietnam War include The Rolling Stones' "Paint it Black", The Beatles' "All You Need is Love," and Jimi Hendrix's "Purple Haze". The 21st century saw the rise of mainstream metal with bands such as Ngũ Cung and Microwave, as well as new alternative rock and pop rock bands, namely Ngọt, Cá Hồi Hoang, and Chillies.

=== Hip hop and rap ===
Hip-hop is first introduced to Vietnam through a 1996 Sprite ad which includes pop lyrics that resembles a rap song. Furthermore, the genre continues to develop with Khanh Nhỏ's "Vietnamese Gang" featuring Thái Việt G, as the song remained as both a breakthrough and a milestone for early hip-hop in Vietnam, objectively viewed as the first Vietnamese song that includes flow and lyricism. The hip-hop scene throughout the 2000s were considered a "golden era" with many underground talents based on rap forums, notably "DSK" or "Die Sonner Kinder" or "Da Sun Kid" (real name Trần Đức Minh) whose fame are heavily relevant to the late 2000s to early 2010s, as he associated the genre with an eccentric style of flow, lyricism and vocal; which crowned him as "King of Rap" in this era with "classics" such as "Lớn Rồi", "Chưa Bao Giờ",..

It is also important to mention about Wowy, then-SouthGangz rapper, he inspired the "mainstream era" for Vietnamese hip-hop with hit songs such as "Hai Thế Giới", "Khu Tao Sống". He notably teamed up with Karik which led to them becoming a very famous rapper couple in Vietnam in 2005s–2010s. Another famous rapper in Vietnam is named Suboi, she is the first Vietnamese female rapper to become successful in her country and is considered "Vietnam's queen of hip hop".

Currently, hip hop plays an important role in V-pop, hip hop gameshow competitions are currently developing in Vietnam such as Rap Viet, King of Rap,... with present influential mainstream rappers such as Jack, RPT MCK, HIEUTHUHAI, Đen, Binz, Low G,...

=== Karaoke music ===
Karaoke music developed in Vietnam in the 1990s. Karaoke music mostly consist of songs with a slow tempo, often with sad and/or romantic lyrics. Vietnamese karaoke with sing-along lyrics often come in the genres of ballad, bolero or like cải lương. Vietnamese ballad and bolero music such at those from Paris by Night or from Vietnamese music productions in Vietnam still remain one of the most popular genres of slow-tempo music for Vietnamese people. Some examples are Love in the sunshine by Trish Thuy Trang and Unforgettable love by Ho Quynh Huong.

== See also ==
- Vietnamese diasporic music
- V-pop
- Popular music of Vietnam
- Ca trù
- Cây đàn sinh viên
- Quan họ
- Nhã nhạc
- Nhạc tài tử
- Traditional Vietnamese dance
- Traditional Vietnamese musical instruments
- Vietnamese theatre
