= Thắng =

Vũ Đinh Trọng Thắng
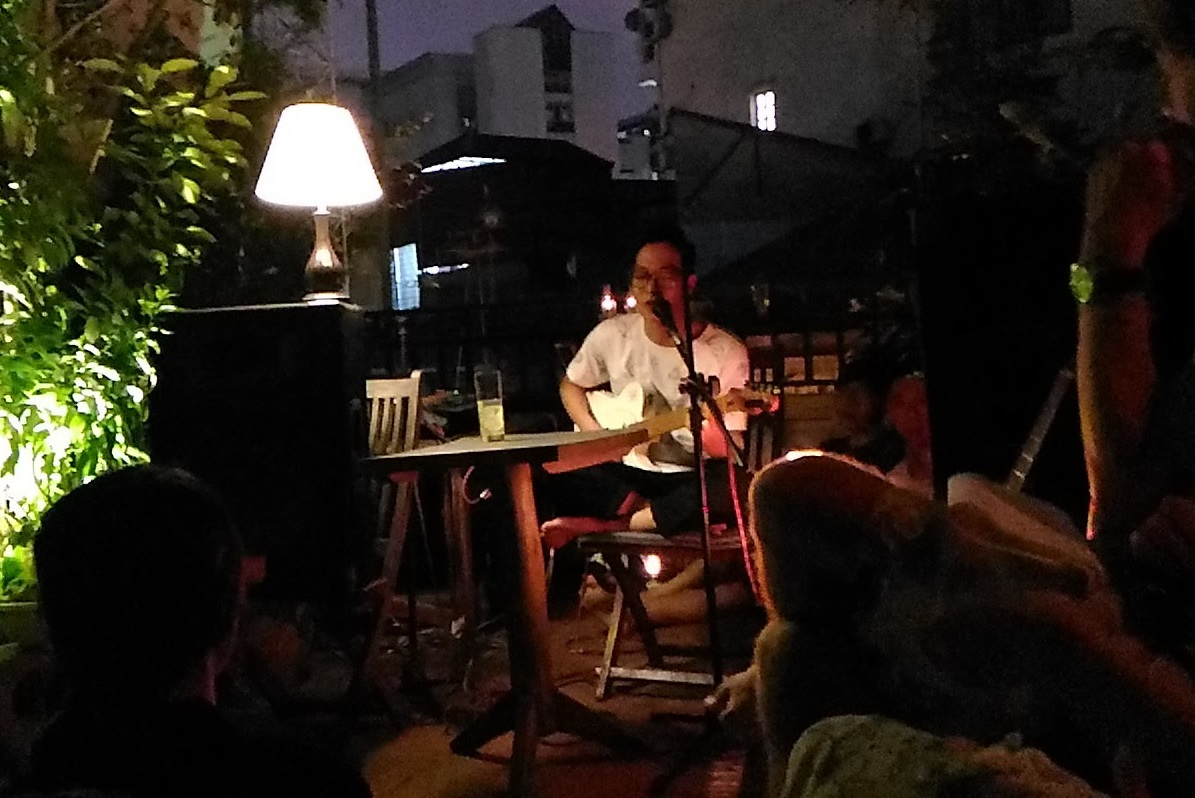
- Thắng in 2016
- Born: Vũ Đinh Trọng Thắng; 6 November 1995 (age 30); Hanoi, Vietnam
- Other name: Thắng (at band Ngọt)
- Education: French Linguistics – VNU University of Languages and International Studies
- Occupations: Singer-songwriter; Record producer
- Years active: 2016–present
- Notable work: Em dạo này, LẦN CUỐI (đi bên em xót xa người ơi), Cho tôi đi theo
- Spouse: Phạm Thành Mỹ Anh (2018–2022)
- Children: 1
- Musical career
- Origin: Hanoi, Vietnam
- Genres: Indie; V-pop; Rock
- Instruments: Vocal music; Guitar
- Partners: Ngọt; Low G; Vũ Thanh Vân; Pixel Neko; Quỳnh Anh; Datmaniac

Vũ Đinh Trọng Thắng (born 6 November 1995), better known as Thắng, is a Vietnamese singer-songwriter and the record producer. He is a songwriter, lead vocalist, rhythm guitarist, and co-founder of band Ngọt, playing a major role in establishing the group as one of the most influential indie pop acts in the Vietnamese music scene. His compositions are often directly inspired by his own thoughts and personal experiences. He currently pursues an independent career following the band's dissolution in 2024. Thắng is also a highly influential figure among young people and within the Vietnamese music landscape.

== Lifestyle and Career ==
=== 1995–2021: Early life and career beginnings ===
Vũ Đinh Trọng Thắng was born on 6 November 1995 in Hanoi, the second of two children. His older brother, Vũ Đinh Hùng (born in 1987), is a musician of the band Cuộc Sống. Thắng was born and raised on Lò Đúc street before moving with his family to Nam Từ Liêm district.

In 2013, Thắng graduated from Trần Phú – Hoàn Kiếm High School and enrolled at the VNU University of Languages and International Studies at Hanoi. That same year, he formed the band Ngọt alongside two other members Nguyễn Hùng Nam Anh and Trần Bình Tuấn, whom he had known since their time together at Tây Sơn Secondary School.

=== 2022: EP Giấy Trắng ===
On September 12, 2022, Thắng officially released the EP "Giấy Trắng," a four-track extended play featuring collaborations with three other indie singer-songwriters.

Three months after releasing his debut EP, Thắng followed up with a single titled "Đã Xem".

=== 2023: Cái Đầu Tiên ===
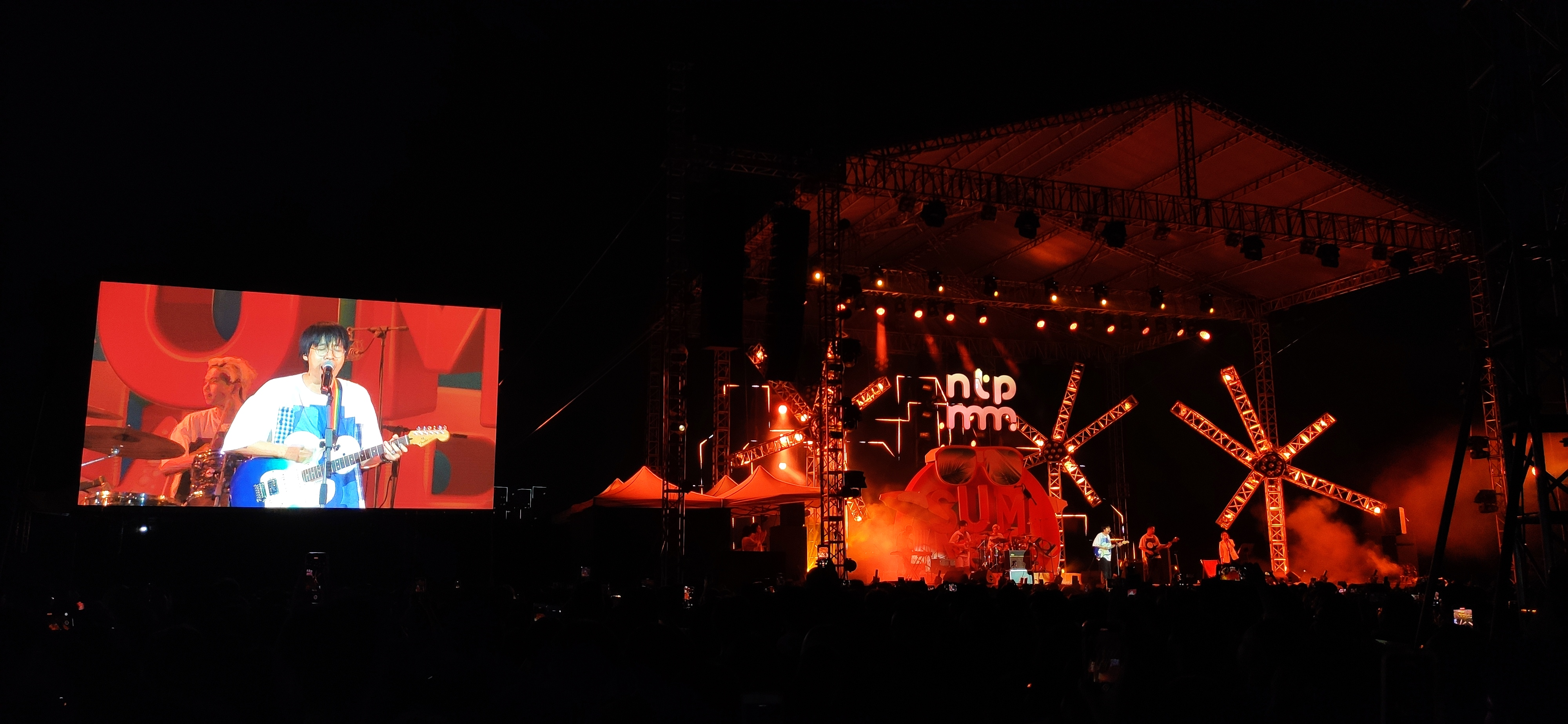
Thắng performing with band Ngọt at the Dreamy Cities (Những thành phố mơ màng) 2023 concert in Hanoi

On February 16, 2023, Thắng returned to the music scene by collaborating with Pixel Neko to release the song "Hái Sao." Two months later, on April 30, he officially launched his debut album, "Cái Đầu Tiên"; this was the singer's first studio album and comprised eight tracks.

Four months later, Thang teamed up with female singer Quỳnh Anh to release the song "Trái Tim Không Ngủ Yên."

=== 2024: Để Nó Đến and Nó ===
In the early hours of April 4, 2024, Thắng released the song "Để Nó Đến" following the disbandment of Ngọt, the band he fronted. Less than a month later, he released album "Nó," a collaboration with rapper Datmaniac.

=== 2024: Hướng Dương ===
On the night of June 2, 2024, Thắng released the song "Hướng Dương" in collaboration with two former members of the band Ngọt: Nguyễn Chí Hùng and Hoàng Chí Trung.

=== 2026: Cái Thứ Hai ===
After a long hiatus, on November 30, 2025, Thắng unexpectedly released the track "Khóc Đấy" in preparation for an upcoming album titled "Cái Thứ Hai" (which later became the first track on that album).

On December 11, 2025, Thắng released the song "Bút Chì Bạc" (which later became track 2 on the album "Cái Thứ Hai").

On February 2, 2026, Thắng released the song "Đồng Ý," featuring a collaboration with Thơ Tơ Mơ. That same afternoon, his album *Cái Thứ Hai* officially went on sale in CD format at LP Club. Featuring guest appearances by artists such as Hà Lê, Wala, and SUNI, this 12-track release marks the singer's second album.

On March 31, Thắng and Hà Lê released the music video for "Gội Đầu" on Thắng's YouTube channel.

On April 5, Thắng released the album "Cái Thứ Hai" on YouTube.

On April 20, Thắng and Wala released the music video for "Nấu Con Beat" on Thắng's YouTube channel.

Also in 2026, Thang embarked on his first multi-region tour as an independent artist. Together with We Are Tomato, he organized the "Tiệc Ngủ" (Sleepover) tour, with dates scheduled for May 17 and 18 at Hanoi, May 24 and 25 at Ho Chi Minh City, and May 30 and 31 at Danang.

== Personal life ==
Thắng got married in August 2018. In October of the same year, his wife gave birth to their first child, affectionately nicknamed "Bé Vừng" (Baby Sesame) by his family and the fanbase of the band Ngọt. On the band's third studio album, Tuyển tập nhạc Ngọt mới trẻ sôi động (released on October 6, 2019), there is a song Thắng wrote for his son titled "(bé)" (track 11).

== Controversy ==
On April 28, 2024, Thắng's personal Facebook account repeatedly posted cryptic status updates, including a message stating he was "giving up drugs from now on." Prior to this, he had frequently posted puzzling updates mentioning names such as Nhung, Giang, and Nấm, while also asking fans for money to produce music and requesting free WiFi and air conditioning. The account also referenced the singer Amee and the song "Trời giấu trời mang đi," as well as "Đen đá không đường." Many audience members left comments on these posts; alongside sarcastic or mocking remarks, a significant number of people expressed concern for Thắng's well-being, suggesting that the artist might be facing mental health issues and needed treatment.

Subsequently, Bi Trố, a member of the band Cát Lún, posted about a singer who treated his wife, children, and friends poorly. In the post, he accused the singer of infidelity, demanding child support money, and starving his children; he also attached screenshots of messages—purportedly from Nấm, Thắng's ex-wife—in the comments section.

== Filmography ==
=== Studio album ===
| Title | Album |
|---|---|
| Cái Đầu Tiên | Release: 30 tháng 4, 2023; Record label: LP Club; Format: Music download, streaming media, CD |
| Cái Thứ Hai | Release: 2 tháng 2, 2026; Record label: LP Club; Format: CD, Music download, streaming media |

=== Expansion pack ===
| Title | Album |
|---|---|
| Giấy Trắng | Release: 12 tháng 9, 2022; Record label: LP Club; Format: Music download, streaming media, mini CD |

=== Single ===
==== Status as main artist ====
| Year | Title | Collaborate with | Album |
|---|---|---|---|
| 2022 | "Hình Trái Tim" | Vũ Thanh Vân | Non-album single |
| 2022 | "Đã Xem" | | Non-album single |
| 2023 | "Trước Khi Em Tồn Tại" | | Cái Đầu Tiên |
| 2024 | "Để Nó Đến" | | Non-album single |
| 2024 | "Nó" | Datmaniac | Non-album single |

==== As a collaborating artist ====
| Year | Title | Collaborate with | Album/EP |
|---|---|---|---|
| 2021 | "An Thần" | Low G | Non-album single |
| 2021 | "An Thần Không Tune" | Low G | Non-album single |
| 2022 | "Đám Cưới Trong Mây" | Mimetals | Miền Đất Còn Lại |
| 2022 | "Cô Gái Tóc Ngắn" | Mimetals | Miền Đất Còn Lại |
| 2022 | "Nỗi Buồn Thổi Lại" | Mimetals | Miền Đất Còn Lại |
| 2022 | "Chiếc Ghế Của Ông" | Mimetals | Miền Đất Còn Lại |
| 2023 | "Hái Sao" | Pixel Neko | Non-album single |
| 2023 | "Trái Tim Không Ngủ Yên" | Quỳnh Anh | Non-album single |
| 2023 | "Tiếp Đất" | Low G, Vantacrow | Non-album single |
| 2024 | Nhức Cả Đầu | Thỏ Trauma, Vinh Khuat | TRAUMATIZED |
| 2024 | Không Làm Gì Ngoài | Thỏ Trauma, Vinh Khuat | TRAUMATIZED |
| 2024 | Đổi Ý | Thỏ Trauma, Vinh Khuat | TRAUMATIZED |
| 2024 | Lâu Đài Cát | Thỏ Trauma, Vinh Khuat | TRAUMATIZED |
| 2024 | Một Tình Ca Nữa | Thỏ Trauma, Vinh Khuat | TRAUMATIZED |
| 2024 | Người Yêu Có Bạn Gái | Đồng Lan | Non-album single |

== Awards and nominations ==
| Year | Award | Act | Nomination for | Result |
|---|---|---|---|---|
| 2020 | Giải thưởng Cống hiến | Musician of the Year | Himself | Nominated |

== See also ==
- Ngọt
