= Low G =

- Born: Nguyễn Hoàng Long; July 23, 1997 (age 29); Đống Đa, Hanoi
- Genre: Rap
- Occupations: Rapper, songwriter, dancer
- Instrument: Vocals
- Works: L2K
- Years active: 2020–present
- Labels: LOWKEYGENIUS; MMusic Records
- Member of: Last Fire Crew; Rap Nhà Làm; Nhà hóa học Đống Đa
- Spouse: Nguyễn Hoàng Dương

Nguyễn Hoàng Long (born July 23, 1997), commonly known by his stage name Low G, is a Vietnamese rapper, songwriter, and dancer. Famous for his distinctive deep voice and rap songs inspired by American hip-hop culture, as well as drawing inspiration from Hanoi culture, he is one of the most influential generation Z rappers in Vietnam, boasting over 2 million monthly listeners on Spotify by January 2026, making him the leading Vietnamese artist on the platform at that time.

Nguyễn Hoàng Long began learning hip-hop dance at the age of 12 and gradually delved into hip-hop culture. He focused on tutting and gloving throughout his years at the Foreign Trade University, winning numerous awards in this field. In 2016, he joined the dance crew Last Fire Crew. In 2018, he joined the group Rap Nhà Làm, using the stage name Low G, and began posting his self-made rap tracks on social media. He gained more attention after his rap track "Thủ Đô Cypher" went viral in 2020, and since then has focused largely on his rapping career. From the beginning of his career until the first half of 2024, Low G released over 40 different singles, some of which were highly successful, such as "Tán Gái 505" (2021), "An Thần" (2021) in collaboration with singer Thắng, "Có Em" (2022) in collaboration with Madihu, and "Simp Gái 808" (2023).

Low G's debut EP, a collaboration with tlinh titled FLVR, was released in September 2024, along with the playlist Tán Gái Phòng Trà and his debut album L2K, released in July and October 2025, respectively. The song "Phóng Zìn Zìn," a collaboration with tlinh on FLVR, received a nomination in the Best collaboration category at the 2024 Green Wave Awards. Low G has performed his rap songs at various music events, notably the GENfest and Những Thành Phố Mơ Màng music festivals; his performance at the 2023 GENfest was compiled into a live album titled Low G (Live from GENfest 2023), released in early 2024.

== Early life ==
Low G was born on July 23, 1997 in Đống Đa district, Hanoi, Vietnam with the birth name Nguyễn Hoàng Long. He attended Đoàn Thị Điểm Junior High School in 2008, then continued his studies at the Foreign Language Specialized School of Vietnam National University, Hanoi from 2012. During his studies, he served as Vice President of the CNN Dance Club for the 2013–2014 term. In 2014, Nguyễn Hoàng Long received a 50% scholarship from the British University Vietnam, however, he chose to study at the Faculty of International Economics, Foreign Trade University to save costs for his family and start becoming financially independent from then on. During his student years, he participated in the Startup with Kawai competition and won the runner-up title.

Long became acquainted with hip hop at the age of 7–8 and was impressed by the culture after watching two movies, You Got Served (2004) and Stomp the Yard (2007), with his father on HBO. At age 12, he began self-taught skateboarding, graffiti art, then C-Walk, and started listening to rap music through MTV and the radio. After going to university, he focused more on dance activities and joined the Last Fire Crew in 2016. He also performed with the Milky Way Crew. In 2017, he and the Foreign Trade University dance club won the Vietnam University Games Northern Region Championship in the dance battle category. He was also the first person in Vietnam to establish the glover community, and worked with two dance styles, tutting and gloving, for four years. Long has won numerous international awards in these two dance disciplines, notably the 2018 Infinity Battle tutting championship, the 2018 Lights On season 2 online gloving championship, and the championship at the Sacred Dimension 2025 event in Japan.

== Career ==
=== 2018–2023: Career beginnings with first singles ===
Nguyễn Hoàng Long joined the Rap Nhà Làm group in 2018, taking the stage name Low G and started posting self-made rap tracks on social media – some of the notable rap tracks during this period were "Cafe Sữa, Trà Đá và Bún Chả", "Cắt Kéo trên Lênin" and the series of "Tán Gái" (including "Tán Gái 101", "Tán Gái 202", "Tán Gái 303", "Tán Gái 505" and "Tán Gái 606"). In July 2020, he contributed vocals to the single "Vứt Zác" by female singer tlinh. On September 29, 2020, Low G released the single "Chán Gái 707" and the song quickly spread on the TikTok platform, although he admitted that he only posted the product because he liked it and had no media plan. In November 2020, Low G formed a small group called Nhà hoá học Đống Đa to create more purely hip hop music, notably "Vua Chơi trên Mặt Trăng" in collaboration with Chí, and "Okeokeoke," both released in 2020. He also began to receive a lot of attention from the online community for being a rapper who did not participate in prominent Vietnamese rapper talent competitions at that time such as King of Rap and Rap Việt. With the orientation of becoming a hip hop dancer, Low G only officially started to consider writing rap as his daily job and began working as an independent artist after receiving an invitation to collaborate with the Mobile Legends brand, and "Lane Nào 'Bá' Nhất?" released in October of the same year was a product born from this collaboration.

Between 2021 and 2023, Low G focused on releasing many singles and collaborating with various artists. Some notable singles include "An Thần" in collaboration with singer Thắng of the band Ngọt, released in October 2021, "Fashion Tán Gái" (2021) in collaboration with Wren Evans, "Càng Cua" (2022), "Tam Giác" (2022) in collaboration with Anh Phan, and two songs "Có Em" (2022) and "Có Khi" (2022) in collaboration with Madihu. In February 2023, he released the single "Thiên Thần Ác Quỷ", experimenting with horrorcore rap style, and performed this song live at ColorsxStudios' A Colors Show event. In June and July of the same year, he released the singles "Muộn Phiền" in collaboration with Phương Ly, and "Tiếp Đất" – his second collaboration with singer Thắng of the band Ngọt. During this time, he also collaborated on the release of promotional songs such as "Chơi Không?" (2021, Mobile Legends brand), in collaboration with tlinh in "Người Đi Bao" (2022, Dibao Vietnam brand), and in collaboration with Wowy & Nân in "Có Chuyện, Cùng Chill" (2022, Beck's Ice brand).

In May 2023, Low G and his manager Dương Fynn established the management company LOWKEYGENIUS to guide professional activities. In July 2023, he collaborated with male singer Mono to release "Stay Cool 2", a promotional song for the Sprite brand; Both artists also performed the song together at music festival events organized by the brand. In late 2023, Low G was one of the artists performing at the GENfest 2023 music festival; the songs he performed at the event were compiled into a live album titled Low G (Live from GENfest 2023), released on digital music platforms in January 2024.

=== 2024–present: FLVR EP and debut album L2K ===
In February 2024, Low G and Anh Phan collaborated with Canadian rapper bbno$ to release the single "Pho Real" after the trio met at a performance in Vietnam. Low G's debut extended play was released by MMusic Records in September 2024 as a collaboration with tlinh titled FLVR. The EP consists of 4 songs co-written and performed by the two artists, with the participation of producers Maiki, 2pillz, and Machiot. The EP has the lead single "Hop on da Show" which was released with a music video, and was also covered by the Korean dance group 1Million Dance in a separate dance video. The product received much praise from both the press and the public for its improvisational, free and unrestrained hip-hop spirit, in which the song "Phóng Zìn Zìn" received a nomination in the Best collaboration category at the 2024 Green Wave Awards. By July 2025, Low G released the playlist Tán Gái Phòng Trà with 5 songs from the "Tán Gái" series remixed in jazz style. Also in this month, he and tlinh became the two artists representing Vietnam to perform at the Sabaidee Festival 2025 in Los Angeles, USA.

Low G's debut studio album, L2K, was released in October 2025. The album was inspired by the Vietnamese hip hop spirit of the 2000s, a glorious period for television culture, when the internet was just beginning to flourish in Vietnam with the trend of chat groups and street fashion trends. With the album title playing on words from "Y2K" – meaning "Long makes music in the 2000s", the album has 16 songs in the hip hop genre about the journey of forming the artist's musical personality, with the vocals of four artists JustaTee, Hoàng Tôn, tlinh and Mỹ Anh, including two singles released before the album's release, "Love Game" and "Nét", and a remix of "Đừng Để Tiền Rơi" in collaboration with rapper Anh Phan with a separate music video released in December 2025. Built in the style of a radio program, the album has diverse styles from technical rap songs to songs with pop, R&B and dance influences, divided into three parts: Flexing – Love – Storytelling, and interspersed between the parts are "Interlude" led by female singer 52Hz in the role of "radio announcer". The album's promotional activities included two album preview events in Ho Chi Minh City and Hanoi, a website simulating the artist's private room in the 2000s, and a series of LowGic Kitchen videos regularly posted on his personal YouTube channel. In December 2025, following the success of the album L2K, Low G was chosen as the cover face for the year-end issue of the international magazine LiFTED Asia. All the songs from L2K were performed live by the rapper at the GENfest Presents Mbillion event in Ho Chi Minh City in November 2025 and in Hanoi in January 2026.

== Musical styles ==
Low G is known for his distinctive voice and rap style, his ability to rhyme 7–8 words, and his unique lyrics. Because he comes from the underground community, Low G tends to explore sensitive topics in his lyrics. His rap music is partly inspired by the original culture of American rap and hip hop, as well as drawing material from where he lives and the people he interacts with.

== Personal life ==
Low G began publicly dating Dương Fynn (real name Nguyễn Hoàng Dương, born in 1997) in 2020, after they met while working together in the dance group Last Fire Crew. From November 2020, Dương Fynn took on the role of managing Low G's work after the success of the song "Thủ Đô Cypher". On the evening of December 15, 2025, Low G officially proposed to Dương Fynn and received great attention from the media. The couple registered their marriage in January 2026.

== Discography ==
=== Studio albums ===
Title	Details
L2K	Released: October 21, 2025; Label: MMusic Records; Formats: Digital download, streaming

=== Live albums ===
Title	Details
Low G (Live from GENfest 2023)	Released: January 9, 2024; Label: MMusic Records; Formats: Digital download, streaming
Low G (Live at GENfest Presents Mbillion)	Released: May 8, 2026; Label: MMusic Records; Formats: Digital download, streaming

=== Extended plays ===
Title	Details
FLVR (with tlinh)	Released: September 18, 2024; Label: MMusic Records; Formats: Digital download, streaming

=== Singles ===
Title	Year	Peak chart positions	Album
Title	Year	VN	Album
"Tán Gái 606"	2020	—	Non-album singles
"Chán Gái 707"	2020	—	Non-album singles
"Lane Nào 'Bá' Nhất?" (with GDucky & Gừng)	2020	—	Non-album singles
"Okeokeoke"	2020	—	Non-album singles
"808 Dollar Bills"	2020	—	Non-album singles
"Nh2D2" (Remix)	2021	—	Non-album singles
"Chơi Không?"	2021	—	Non-album singles
"Cypher Nhà Làm" (featuring ResQ)	2021	—	Non-album singles
"Simple Cypher"	2021	—	Non-album singles
"Tán Gái 303"	2021	—	Non-album singles
"Tán Gái 505"	2021	—	Non-album singles
"Flexin' trên Circle K 2"	2021	—	Non-album singles
"Đi Bể Bơi"	2021	—	Non-album singles
"An Thần" (hợp tác với Thắng)	2021	—	Non-album singles
"Ôi Bạn Ơi"	2021	—	Non-album singles
"Dáng Xinh"	2021	—	Non-album singles
"Fashion Tán Gái" (featuring Wren Evans)	2021	—	Non-album singles
"Càng Cua"	2022	—	Non-album singles
"Tam Giác" (with Anh Phan)	2022	—	Non-album singles
"Không Thích"	2022	—	Non-album singles
"Có Em" (with Madihu)	2022	—	Có
"Phân Thân"	2022	—	Non-album singles
"Người Đi Bao" (with tlinh)	2022	—	Non-album singles
"Có Chuyện, Cùng Chill" (with Wowy & Nân)	2022	—	Non-album singles
"Không Thèm"	2022	—	Non-album singles
"Thơ"	2022	—	Non-album singles
"Có Khi" (with Madihu)	2022	—	Có
"Đơn Giản"	2022	—	Non-album singles
"Dáng xấu"	2022	—	Non-album singles
"Thiên Thần Ác Quỷ"	2023	—	Non-album singles
"Luôn Yêu Đời" (Remix) (with Đen & Cheng)	2023	—	Non-album singles
"Muộn Phiền" (with Phương Ly)	2023	—	Non-album singles
"Tiếp Đất" (with Thắng)	2023	—	Non-album singles
"Stay Cool 2" (with Mono)	2023	—	Non-album singles
"Simp Gái 808"	2023	—	Non-album singles
"Bảo Tàng"	2023	—	Non-album singles
"Giọng Ta" (with Daisy Le Garçon)	2023	—	Non-album singles
"Phong Long" (with Obito & WokeUp)	2024	—	Non-album singles
"Pho Real" (with Anh Phan & bbno$)	2024	—	Non-album singles
"Quá Sớm"	2024	—	Non-album singles
"Podcast" (with gung0cay)	2024	—	Non-album singles
"Vô Tư Đi"	2024	—	Non-album singles
"Hop on da Show" (with tlinh)	2024	—	FLVR
"6262"	2024	—	Non-album singles
"Love Game"	2025	—	L2K
"Nét"	2025	—	L2K
"In Love"	2025	7	L2K
"Đừng Để Tiền Rơi" (with Anh Phan)	2025	—	Non-album singles
"Chất Gây Hại" (with Quang Hùng MasterD)	2025	3	Non-album singles

== Accolades ==
Year	Award	Category	Recipient(s)	Result	Ref.
2021	2020 WeChoice Awards	Promising rap/hip hop face	Low G	Nominated	
2024	2024 Male Icon Awards	Emerging icon of the year	Low G	Nominated	
2025	2024 Ngôi Sao Xanh Awards	Best music video	"Hop on da Show" (with tlinh)	Nominated	
2025	2024 Green Wave Awards	Best collaboration	"Phóng Zìn Zìn" (with tlinh)	Nominated	
2025	2024 Green Wave Awards	Favorite male singer/rapper	Low G	Nominated	
2025	2024 WeChoice Awards	Music video of the year	"Hop on da Show" (with tlinh)	Nominated	
2025	2024 WeChoice Awards	EP/Album of the year	FLVR (with tlinh)	Nominated	
2025	2025 Male Icon Awards	Rapper of the year	Low G	Nominated	
2026	2025 Ngôi Sao Xanh Awards	Favorite male singer/rapper	Low G	Nominated	
2026	2025 WeChoice Awards	Favorite singer/rapper	Low G	Nominated	
