= Chillies (band) =

Vietnamese pop rock band

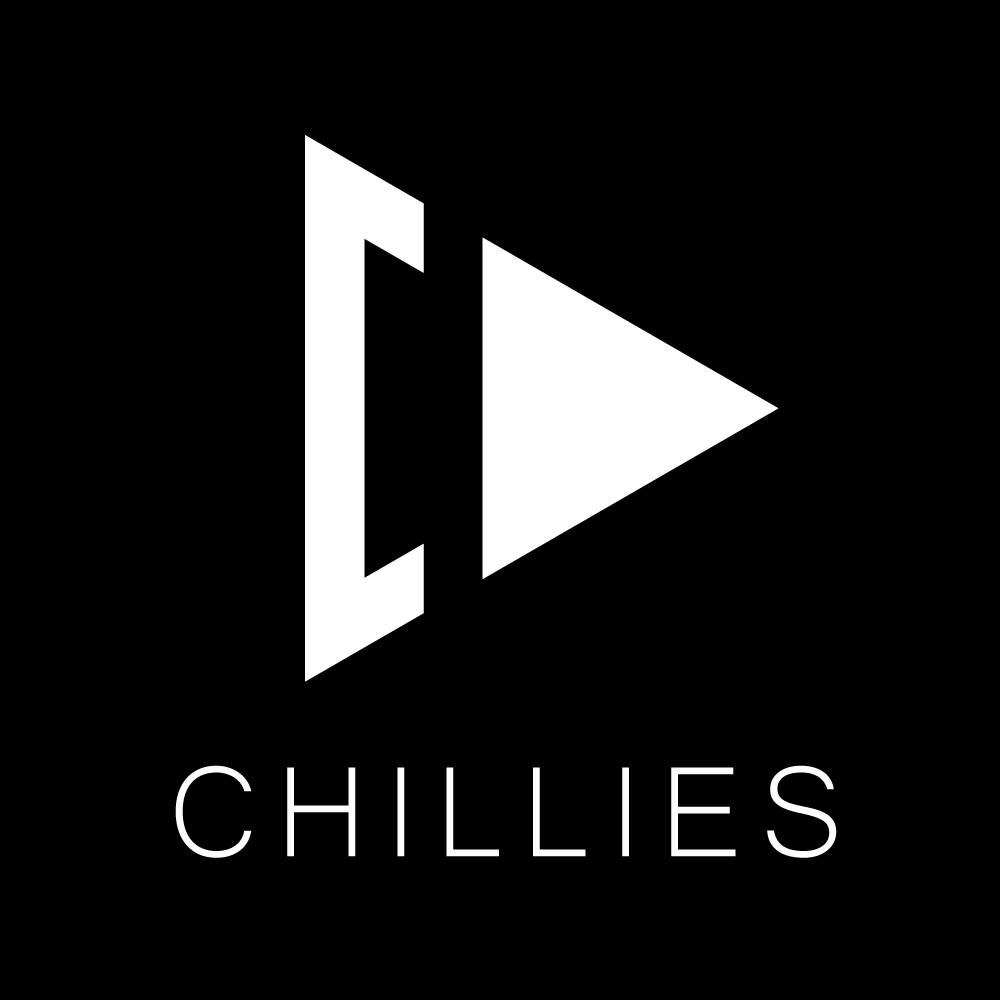

Background information
- Genres: Pop rock; Indie music
- Instruments: Piano, guitar, electric guitar, drums, bass guitar, keyboard
- Years active: 2018–present
- Labels: Warner Music Group (2020–2026); Sony Music (2026-present)
- Partner(s): Rhymastic; Suni Hạ Linh; BLAZE
- Members: Trần Duy Khang; Nhím Biển; Nguyễn Văn Phước; Sĩ Phú
- Past members: Tô Đông Phong

Chillies is a Vietnamese band consisting of 4 members: Trần Duy Khang, Nhím Biển, Nguyễn Văn Phước, and Sĩ Phú. The group was formed in October 2018. At the 2021 Dedication Music Awards, Chillies received two nominations in the categories of "Music Video of the Year" (for the song "Cứ chill thôi") and "New Artist of the Year" (for Trần Duy Khang, the group's lead singer and songwriter).

== History ==
=== Formation ===
Nhím and Phước studied music in Nha Trang before moving to Saigon to build their careers. Phú was an international student in Traditional Music, specializing in the đàn tam thập lục (hammered dulcimer). Finally, there is vocalist and songwriter Khang, who gave up teaching English to pursue music. The band was formed during a music event at Hard Rock Cafe Saigon. Chillies started their career by performing popular covers at bars like Yoko Cafe and Acoustic Bar.

=== 2018: Debut single and public recognition ===
The group officially debuted in October 2018 with their first release titled Who? (The Tinder Song). They gained wider public recognition with the song Và thế là hết (And That Is the End). Released in December, the song tells a story of heartbreak and the hollow feeling of looking back at a broken romance where two people lost each other on a somber, rainy afternoon. Chillies shared that their debut track was originally intended mainly for friends to listen to and support, and they never expected it to become such a hit.

=== 2019: Release of singles, soundtracks, and the breakthrough with Mascara ===
On March 29, 2019, the group released the single Nếu ngày mai không đến (If Tomorrow Never Comes). This was followed by Những con đường song song (Parallel Roads) in May of the same year. The song serves as an anchor for lonely souls searching for something distant. It speaks of bittersweet emotions, the regret of parting ways, and the need to find a different, simple happiness for oneself. Other musical products released by the group afterward included "Có em đời bỗng vui" (Life is Suddenly Joyful with You). Although the MV didn't go viral on digital platforms or hit the top trending charts like many contemporary releases, it left a lasting impression on audiences through its inspiring musical storytelling.

In July, the group released the original soundtrack Cảm ơn và xin lỗi (Thank You and Sorry) for the feature film Thưa mẹ con đi on their official YouTube channel.

Released at the end of 2019, the song Mascara is considered the most warmly received track of the group's career.

The group stated they don't want to release too many MVs because they don't want people to remember Chillies through visuals, but rather want the audience to listen more than they watch.

=== 2020: Maintaining momentum with "Có em đời bỗng vui", "Vùng ký ức", and "Cứ chill thôi" ===
In February, Chillies officially released the MV for "Có em đời bỗng vui" on the group's official YouTube channel.

In March 2020, Chillies officially became artists under Warner Music Vietnam, a record label under Warner Music Group.

By late March, Chillies released "Vùng ký ức", which was warmly received by fans. The music video for the song was filmed in Da Lat.

The group had a collaboration with singer Suni Hạ Linh and rapper Rhymastic released in July of the same year titled "Cứ chill thôi."

Chillies showcased their musical diversity through "Qua khung cửa sổ"—the lead single for the group's debut studio album of the same name. The track carries a ballad feel with a gentle piano intro, soft lyrics, and a soulful vibe that draws listeners into a lyrical, slightly haunting musical world. Just one week after its release, the MV reached 1 million views on YouTube.

Right on Christmas, the next single titled "Giá như" was released. The song was also taken from the group's debut album, which was expected to launch in the first quarter of 2021. The single features a synthwave sound and brought many surprises to fans.

=== 2023: The group's first concert, "Trên Những Đám Mây" ===
At the beginning of the year, Chillies released the EP "Trên Những Đám Mây", which was also the theme of their concert.

In March, Chillies held their first concert in Ho Chi Minh City with a scale of 5,000 attendees at the Military Zone 7 Competition Center.

In early April, Chillies continued their concert tour at the Quan Ngua Sports Palace in Hanoi.

=== 2024: Release of the double single "Đại Lộ Mặt Trời" ===
On January 4, 2024, the group released the double single "Đại Lộ Mặt Trời", marking their first international collaboration with Morisaki Win—the singer and actor from the blockbuster hit "Ready Player One".

On July 1, 2024, Chillies released the OST for Mùa hè đẹp nhất titled "Cơn Mưa Rào Đầu Tiên."

=== 2026: Release of the single "Từ đầu" ===
On May 21, 2026, Chillies released the single "Từ Đầu"

== Musical style ==
Chillies' music has never focused on a single specific genre. At the same time, the group does not define the music they pursue as any fixed genre, but always wants their products to have diverse transformations. The group's musical style blends various genres such as Pop, Alternative Rock, Funk, RnB, Retrowave

== Awards and nominations ==
- Won the "WebTV Asia Award 2019" in the "Rising Indie Artists Of The Year" category
- Won the "WeChoice Awards" 2018 in the "Rising artist" category
- Nominated for the 2021 Dedication Music Award for Music Video of the Year: "Cứ chill thôi"
- Nominated for the 2021 Dedication Music Award for New Artist of the Year: "Trần Duy Khang"
