= Xoan singing =

Genre of Vietnamese folk music

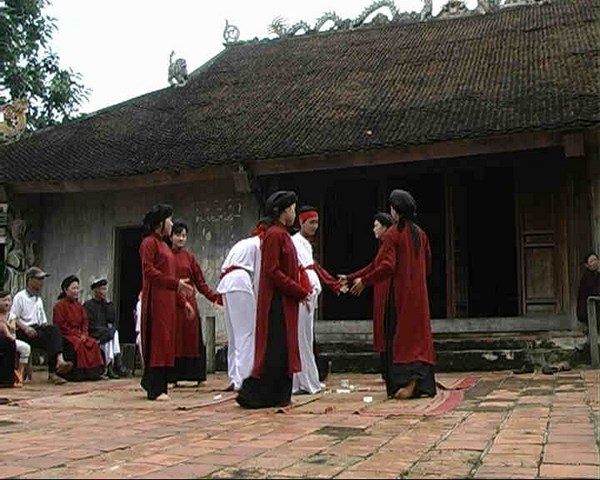
- Xoan singing performance in đình
- Native name: Hát xoan
- Stylistic origins: Folk music
- Cultural origins: Phú Thọ Province

Xoan singing of Phú Thọ Province, Viet Nam
- UNESCO Intangible Cultural Heritage
- Country: Vietnam
- Reference: 01260
- Region: Asia and the Pacific

Inscription history
- Inscription: 2017 (12th session)
- List: Representative

Xoan singing or hát xoan (Vietnamese for 'spring singing', Chữ Nôm: 咭春) is a genre of Vietnamese folk music performed in spring during the first two months of the Tết Nguyên Đán in Phú Thọ Province. The genre includes acting, ceremony, chant, dancing, drumming, and singing; with themes involve romance, riddles, and work. Traditionally occurring in temples, shrines, and communal homes, the songs are performed by a guild, led by a trùm, consisting of male instrumentalists, or kép, and female singers, or đào. A guild consists of ten to fifteen performers, but there are few remaining, increasingly aging, guilds and teachers of this primarily oral tradition.

There are three types of xoan singing: honoring Hùng kings and Thành hoàng (village guardian gods); wishing for good crops, health, and luck; and festive courtship songs alternating male and female voices. The texture is "spare"; perfect fourths are prominent; and instruments include drums and clappers.

Hát is singing or acting and xoan derives from xuân ('spring'). In 2011, UNESCO inscribed Hát xoan in the List of Intangible Cultural Heritage in Need of Urgent Safeguarding. In 2017, UNESCO removed xoan from that list and included it in the Representative List of the Intangible Cultural Heritage of Humanity.
