= Cây đàn sinh viên =

Cây đàn sinh viên (roughly translated as The guitar of students) is a Vietnamese song written by songwriter Quốc An in 2001, with lyrics by a student named Thuận Thiên, who emailed it to Quốc An in the hope that the songwriter could write a song based on his writing. Cây đàn sinh viên was first recorded by Mỹ Tâm through Sài Gòn Vafaco Company and later covered by several artists such as Việt Quang, Group 1088,...

Since its release, the song has received positive reception from audiences, mostly teenagers and students. The song's success also made the names for both Quốc An and Mỹ Tâm.

In 2002, with Cây đàn sinh viên, Mỹ Tâm won Favorite Female Artist award at the 7th Yellow Mai Awards. Later, the song, together with other popular compositions such as Hát với dòng sông, Hát cho người ở lại, Đêm cô đơn, etc. were performed by the trio KTX, which involved three songwriters named Quốc An, Hoài An and Công Tuấn, for numerous times at hostels of several universities and were received with enthusiasm.

In November 2003, Cây đàn sinh viên was used in a television commercial without permission from songwriter Quốc An. He had contact the Vietnam Musical Authorship Rights Protection Center and the issue was settled down one year later.
