= Lifted Asia =

Pan-Asian online publication

LiFTED Asia
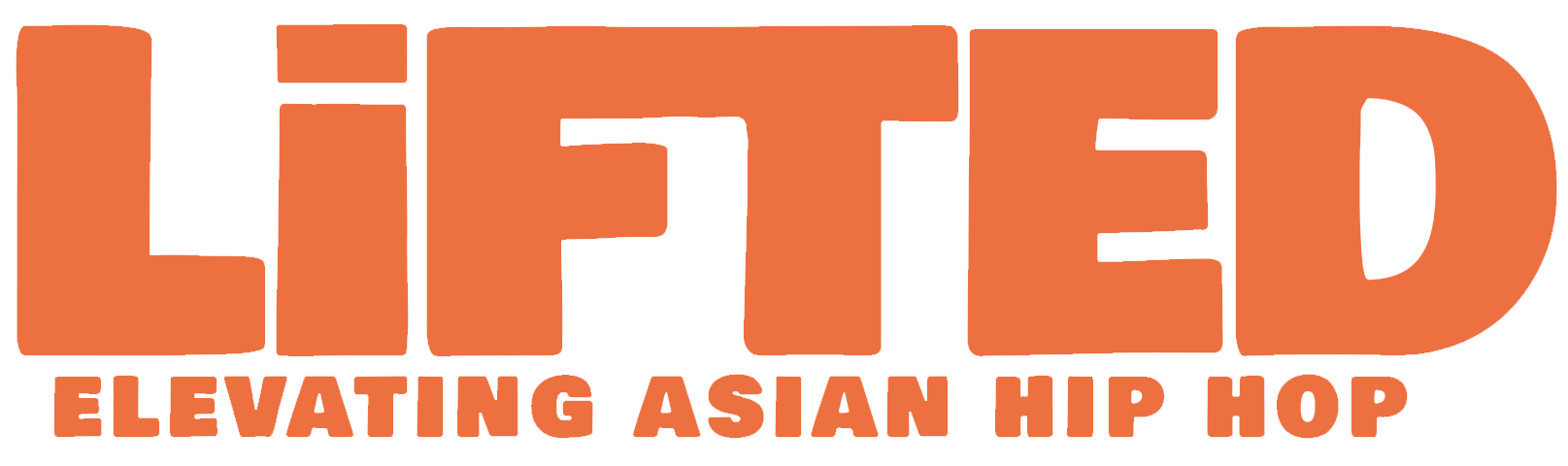
- Editor in Chief: Marcus Aurelius
- Staff writers: Lists Marcus Aurelius; Sean Dinsmore; Adrianna Cheung
- Categories: Music, media
- Founded: March 2021
- Country: Hong Kong
- Language: English
- Website: liftedasia.com

Lifted Asia (stylised as LiFTED) is a pan-Asian media platform and online publication founded in March 2021, covering hip hop music and culture across Asia. The platform focuses on documenting both emerging and established artists from across the region, including China, Vietnam, Taiwan, India, Indonesia and the Philippines.

KSR Corp. announced on March 19, 2026, the launch of Lifted Japan the Japanese edition.

== LiFTED 50 ==
Lifted Asia publishes an annual ranking known as the LiFTED 50, which lists the top 50 rappers in Asia. The list includes both established and up-and-coming artists from across the region.

The 2023 edition, produced in partnership with Jägermeister, featured artists from India, South Korea, Thailand, Japan, the Philippines and China, along with representation from Vietnam, Singapore, Indonesia, Mongolia and Cambodia. It also recorded a higher number of female rappers and groups compared with previous editions.
