= Vinh Khuat =

Vietnamese-German male singer, songwriter and music producer

Khuat Duy Vinh, stage name Vinh Khuat, is a Vietnamese-German male singer, songwriter and music producer.

== Biography ==
Vinh Khuat was born on March 20, 1990, in Hanoi and moved to Hamelin, Germany at the age of one. His family has a musical tradition, his maternal grandfather is artist Nguyen Minh Tam, accordion and saxophone teacher, his mother is the manager of a House of Culture and a piano teacher of the National Academy of Music. He and his younger brother were taught piano by their mother at the age of 4.

== Career ==
At 15, Vinh took part in the Golden Voice contest and won two awards for Most Impressive Contestant and Young Talent Award. At the age of 18, he won the first prize in the "Made in Schaumburg" competition. He composed music at the age of 19, but it wasn't until the age of 23 that he focused on that work, creating music in German, English and Vietnamese. He graduated from the Hannover Conservatory with two majors in jazz singing and composition.

In 2011, Vinh won the first prize in an a cappella competition in Austria and participated in the Boss Loop Station World Championship for Germany, Austria and Switzerland winning in 2012. In the same year, he won 2 judges' and audience's first prizes, along with a media award for favorite person at the Hannover songcontest "Hören 2012" competition. He went to the world championships held in Los Angeles, USA and won the fourth place. In 2013, he took part in the New Wave music competition in Latvia winning third place and was featured on the country's postage stamps.

In 2017, he was a finalist in the German television show, The Voice, and was involved in Germany's 2018 Eurovision Song Contest

In early 2019, performed at the Lunar New Year and the Sao Mai Gala of Vietnam Television, after musician Huy Tuan took notice to his videos on YouTube. In October 2019, he returned to Vietnam to participate with other international guests in the Monsoon Music Festival. In addition, he also appeared in the New Year's Eve program " Dance of Light - Countdown 2020 " in Hanoi.

== See also ==
- The Voice of Vietnam (season 6)
