= Suni Hạ Linh =

Vietnamese musician (born 1990)

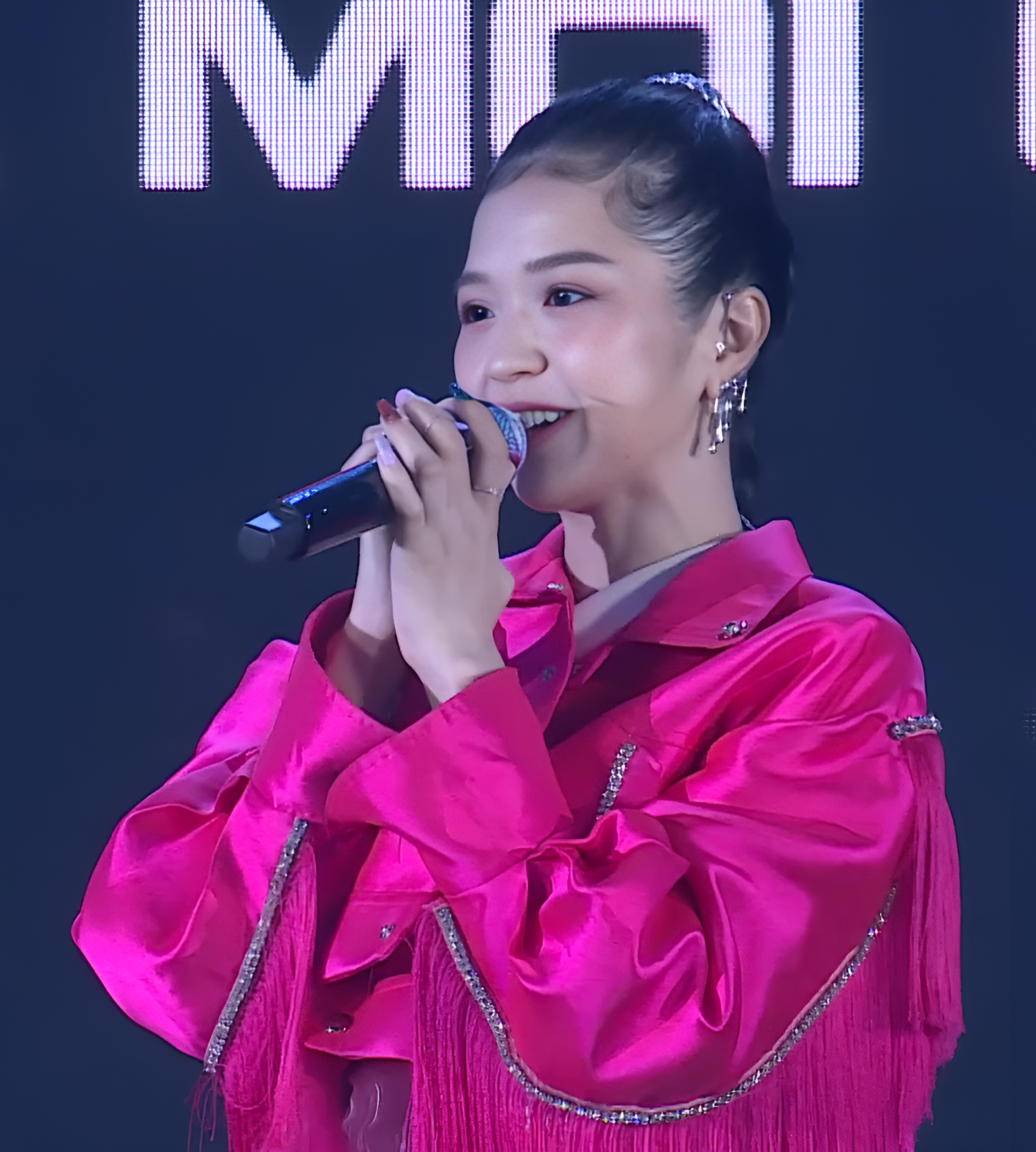
- Suni Hạ Linh in 2022

Background information
- Born: Ngô Đặng Thu Giang; September 6, 1990 (age 35); Ho Chi Minh City, Vietnam
- Origin: Hanoi, Vietnam
- Genres: Pop, dance-pop, ballad
- Years active: 2016–

Ngô Đặng Thu Giang (born 6 September 1990), professionally known as Suni Hạ Linh, is a Vietnamese musician and singer.

== Early life ==
Ngô Đặng Thu Giang was born into a family where her parents and older sister are dancers. Her father is Ngô Đặng Cường, a former principal of the Ho Chi Minh City Dance School. She had an interest in music since she was a middle school student. In 2008, Cleverlearn English Center cooperated with Ho Chi Minh City Television and Music World Company to organize the English singing contest Cleverlearn Super Stars. She participated in this contest and won first prize.

Listening to her parents' advice, she chose to pursue the finance degree at the Victoria University of Wellington in New Zealand and eventually completed her study abroad. Upon returning to Vietnam, she worked at a bank for three months before realizing that the job was unsuitable for her.

== Career ==
=== 2012–2015: Participate in music competitions ===
In September 2012, Giang participated in the show K-Pop Star Hunt Audition in Vietnam, and became the runner-up. She and Nguyễn Diệu Hương Trang, the audition's champion, were the two representatives of Vietnam participating in the K-Pop Star Hunt Season 2 contest in Korea along with 14 other contestants, and she stopped in the Top 16. In 2014, she participated in the VK-Pop Super Star and finished in the third place. In May 2015, Giang participated in the TV show Chinh phục ước mơ and was eliminated in the first challenge.

=== 2015–2017: Debut single "Em đã biết" ===
In 2015, Giang had a new stage name, Suni Hạ Linh. In October 2015, she collaborated with Phạm Hồng Phước to release a song titled "Cảm ơn người đã rời xa tôi". The song was written based on the book of the same name by writer Hà Thanh Phúc.

In 2016, she released the first single, "Em đã biết". The song belongs to the Rnb/Soul genre with a gentle music style and was nominated for "Phenomenal Song" at Green Wave Award 2016. In October 2016, she released the single "Say Yes". In July 2017, she released the single "Cảm nắng" consisting of two songs: "Cảm nắng" và "Tình đầu".

=== 2018–2019: "Thích rồi đấy", "Không sao mà em đây rồi" ===
In 2018, Suni Hạ Linh left the management company Dreams Entertainment. In July 2018, she performed the song "Chuyến đi của thanh xuân". This is the theme song of the movie of the same name composed by Khắc Hưng. In August 2018, she released the single "Thích rồi đấy", another song composed by musician Khắc Hưng. The song belongs to the Pop genre, with a fun and cute style. At the end of 2018, she released a ballad song titled "Đi tìm người yêu".

In July 2019, she released the single "Không sao mà, em đây rồi" after nearly a year of preparation, it is a pop ballad song composed by Lyly and Suni Hạ Linh. In the music video, Suni plays the role of the third person in the love triangle, always silently caring for the boy. When his lover returned, she decided to give up and step back to see her lover happy. The song reached No. 9 on the weekly Zing Chart.

=== 2020–2021: Collaborative singles ===
From 2020 to 2022, Suni Hạ Linh had no singles or albums as a main artist. She has collaborated with other artists. "Cứ chill thôi", a song by Chillies featuring her and Rhymastic, released in July 2020. The song attracted 55 million views on YouTube within 9 months, was used in millions of videos on Douyin, and received a Dedication Music Award nomination in the "Music Video of the Year" category.

"Nói lời hiển nhiên" by Suni Hạ Linh, Dế Choắt and Hoàng Dũng released in mid 2021. This is the first song in which Suni has the role of a music producer. In December 2021, Hoàng Dũng and Suni Hạ Linh released "Cảm ơn nhà" MV to advertise Samsung TVs.

=== 2022–2023: Hương mùa hè series, "Ngỏ lời" and "Sự mập mờ" ===
In February 2022, on the occasion of the 83rd birth anniversary of the musician Trịnh Công Sơn, the song "Nắng thủy tinh" performed by Avin Lu and Suni Hạ Linh were released. In 2022, she participated in the music series "Hương mùa hè" with Orange, Hoàng Dũng, Grey D and Tlinh. She covered "Vào hạ", "Dằm trong tim" and some other songs.

In May 2023, Suni Hạ Linh announced her intention to release the EP Single Single with 5 songs. Two songs from this EP have been released: "Ngỏ lời" (pre-single, released in May 2023) and "Sự mập mờ" (released in July 2023) In Vietnam, the song reached number 1 on YouTube Trending Music, TikTok New Released and number 3 on Apple Music. In October 2020, Suni Hạ Linh and Hoàng Dũng performed a duet at the We Are One Festival in Suwon. Additionally, Suni Hạ Linh performed at Korea-Vietnam Friendship Cultural Festival in Ho Chi Minh City and covered the song "Nhé anh" by singer Mỹ Tâm.

=== 2024: Ride the Wind 2024 ===
In spring 2024, she released two singles: "Xuân bướm xinh" (mashup 4 songs: "Hoa cỏ mùa xuân", "Khúc giao mùa", "Con bướm xuân" and "Xuân đã về") and "Lạc khách" (with Juun D).

In April 2024, she participated in the program Ride the Wind 2024 organized by Hunan Television. This is the fifth season of Sisters Who Make Waves. She advanced to the finals, but did not win a debut spot.

== Style ==
Suni Hạ Linh is fluent in Vietnamese, English, Korean and Chinese. She is a lover of Korean music. She still identifies herself as a Vietnamese artist and singing songs for Vietnamese audiences. In years, she pursued the image of a colorful, sweet, gentle, girl and is likened to the "girl next door". The singer is praised for her sweet and clear voice. In 2024, she changed her style and showing a preference for darker colors. Responding to Elle Vietnam, she said that the image of a gentle, pure and dreamy girl is only aspects that make up about 30% of her personality. She compares herself to "a caterpillar that has turned into a butterfly but cannot escape from the cocoon" and wants to express the remaining 70% of her personality.

== Discography ==
=== Singles as main artist ===
- "Em đã biết" (feat. R.Tee) (2016)
- "Say yes" (2016)
- "Cảm nắng" (2017)
- "Chuyến đi của thanh xuân" (2018)
- "Thích rồi đấy" (2018)
- "Cưới nha anh" (2019)
- "Không sao mà em đây rồi" (feat. Lou Hoàng) (2019)
- "Ngỏ lời" (2023)
- "Sự mập mờ" (feat. Grey D) (2023)
- "Nhé anh" (cover) (2023)
- "Xuân bướm xinh" (2024)

=== Singles as featured artist ===
- "Cảm ơn người đã rời xa tôi" (Phạm Hồng Phước feat. Suni Hạ Linh)
- "Chẳng thể là ai khác" (Juun D feat. Suni Hạ Linh) (2015)
- "Chờ nhau nhé" (with Suni Hạ Linh) (2017)
- "Chỉ cần là mình cùng nhau" (with Kai Đinh and Monstar) (2017)
- "Ăn sáng nha" (Erik feat. Suni Hạ Linh) (2020)
- "Cứ chill thôi" (Chillies feat. Suni Hạ Linh and Rhymastic) (2020)
- "Nói lời hiển nhiên" (with Dế Choắt and Hoàng Dũng) (2021)
- "Cảm ơn nhà" (Hoàng Dũng feat. Suni Hạ Linh) (2021)
- "Nắng thủy tinh" (Avin Lu feat. Suni Hạ Linh) (2022)
- "Lạc khách" (with Juun D) (2024)

=== Songs in chart ===
Song title	Peak chart position
Song title	VN
"Không sao mà, em đây rồi" (feat. Lou Hoàng)	— (Note: "Không sao mà, em đây rồi" did not enter the Billboard Vietnam Hot 100 but peaked at number 96 on the Billboard Vietnam Top Vietnamese Songs chart.)
"Cứ chill thôi" (Chillies feat. Suni Hạ Linh and Rhymastic)	25
"Nắng thủy tinh" (Avin Lu feat. Suni Hạ Linh)	63
"Vào hạ"	28
"Dằm trong tim" (with TDK)	22
"Khi cô đơn em nhớ đến ai" (with Grey D, Orange and Hoàng Dũng)	60
"'Yêu yêu yêu' mashup" (with Hoàng Dũng, Grey D, Orange and TDK)	99
"Có hẹn với thanh xuân" (with Hoàng Dũng, Grey D, Orange and Tlinh)	26
"Ngỏ lời"	22
"Sự mập mờ" (feat. Grey D)	5

== Filmography ==
- Star Story (2017)

== Videography ==
=== TV series ===
- Cleverlearn Super Stars (2008)
- K-Pop Star Hunt (2012)
- VK-Pop Super Star (2014)
- Ride the Wind (2024)

=== Other series ===
- Hương mùa hè (2022)

== Awards and nominations ==
Award	Year of ceremony	Nominee/work	Category	Result
Dedication Music Award	2021	"Cứ chill thôi"	Music Video of the Year	Nominated
Green Wave Award	2016	"Em đã biết"	Phenomenal Song	Nominated
Keeng Young Awards	2017	"Chờ nhau nhé"	Pop Song	Won
Zing Music Awards	2016	"Em đã biết"	Favorite R&B/Soul song	Won
