= Phạm Văn Tỵ =

Vietnamese musician (born 1956)

Phạm Văn Tỵ (born 1956 near Nam Dinh, North Vietnam) is a Vietnamese musician, known for his virtuosity on the Đàn nguyệt (moon lute) and his knowledge of the art of chau van.

Ty moved to Hanoi in 1973 to study at the Hanoi Conservatory of Music. He had previously joined the Nam Dinh Folk Song and Dance Troupe, where he developed his interest in chau van. After graduating from the conservatory, he joined the Folk Culture Institute, where he completed a master's degree and is still a researcher. Since the 1980s, Ty has been the principal moon lute player and singer at the Den Dau (Mulberry Temple) in Hanoi.

Ty has released numerous recordings of traditional Vietnamese music, and has performed in Asia, Europe, and the United States. In 1998 he won a gold medal at a Vietnamese national music festival for his song "For the Fighters at the Frontier," based on a poem he had written himself. In 2001, the Vietnam Ministry of Culture named Ty as an Nghệ sĩ Ưu tú (Artist of Merit), a title awarded for exceptional achievements in the arts.
