= Bắc Quang, Tuyên Quang =

Bắc Quang Xã Bắc Quang
- Commune
- Bắc Quang commune
- Location within Vietnam
- Coordinates: 22°24′57″N 104°48′27″E
- Country: Vietnam
- Region: Northeast
- Province: Tuyên Quang
- Time zone: UTC+7 (UTC + 7)

Bắc Quang is a commune (xã) of Tuyên Quang Province, Vietnam.

On 16 June 2025, the Standing Committee of the National Assembly promulgated Resolution No. 1684/NQ-UBTVQH15 on the rearrangement of commune-level administrative units of Tuyên Quang Province in 2025. Accordingly, the entire natural area and population of Việt Quang Town, Quang Minh Commune, and Việt Vinh Commune are rearranged to form a new commune named Bắc Quang Commune.
