= Đàn tam thập lục =

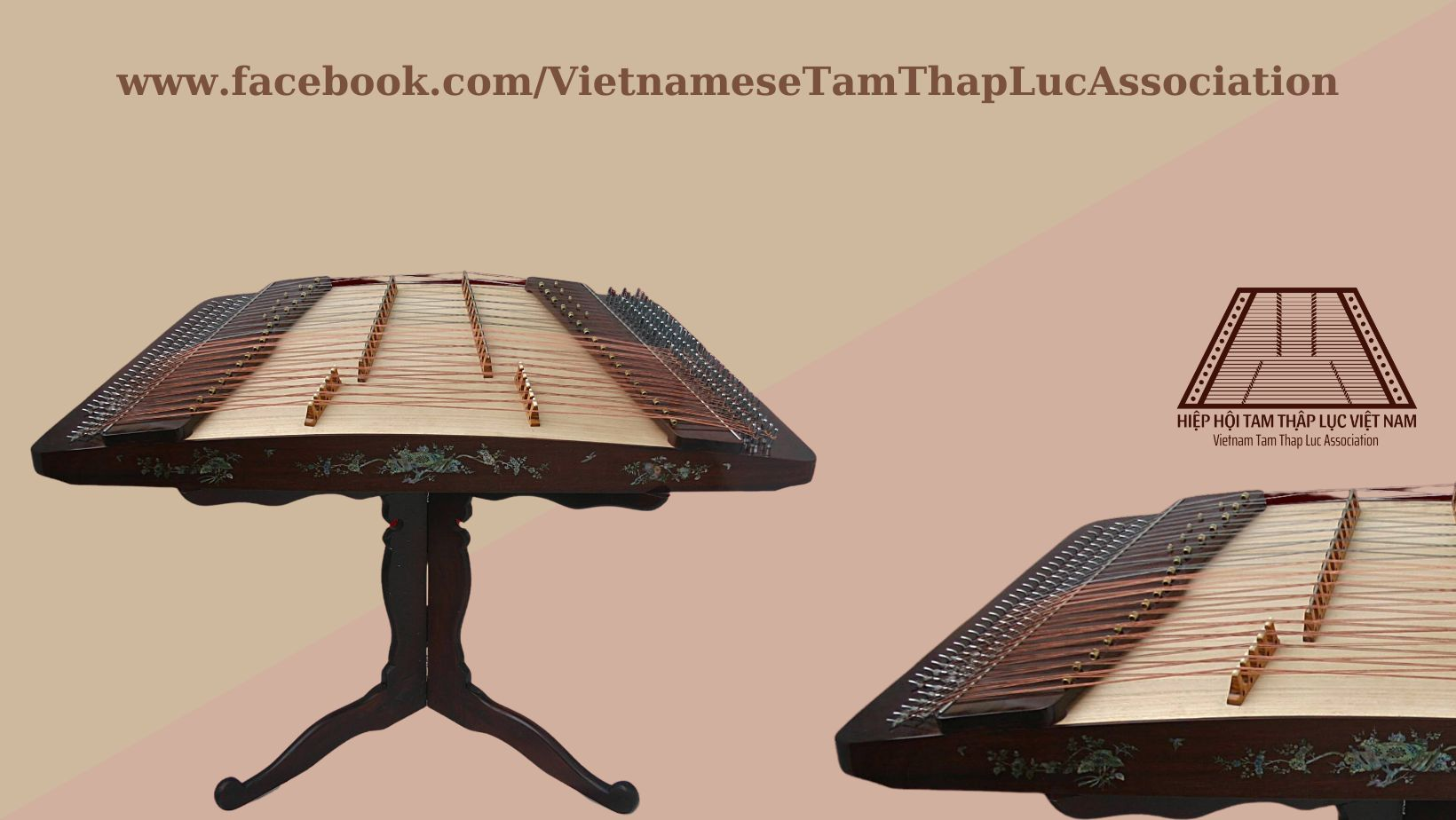
Đàn tam thập lục

The đàn tam thập lục (chữ Hán: 彈三十六, also called simply tam thập lục) is a Vietnamese hammered dulcimer with 36 metal strings. It is used in various genres of traditional music and drama, as well as in modernized traditional music. The instrument is very similar to the Chinese yangqin.
