= Ngọt =

Vietnamese indie band

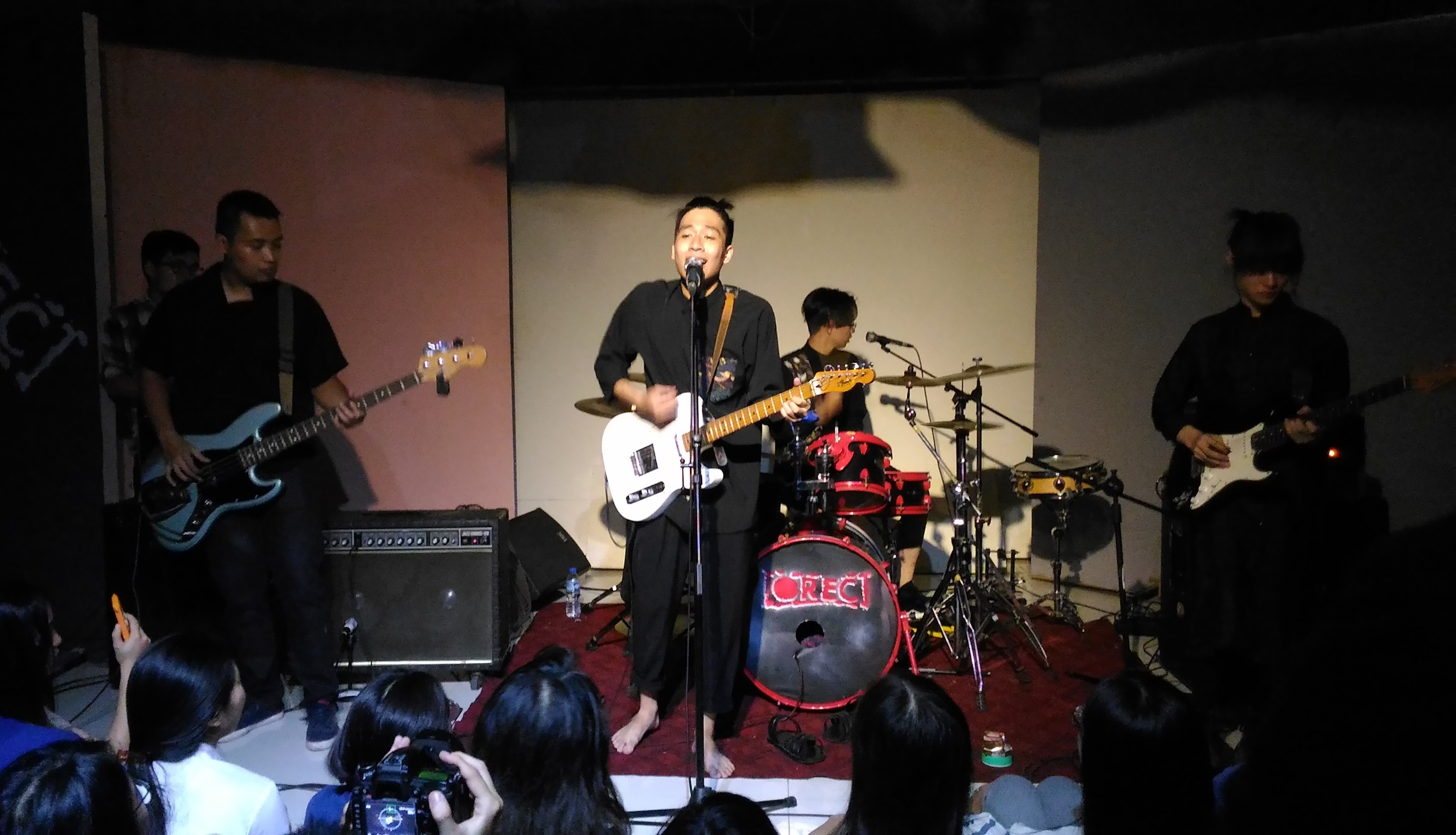
- Ngọt performing in 2016

Background information
- Origin: Hanoi, Vietnam
- Genres: Indie pop; Pop rock; Alternative rock
- Years active: 2013–2024
- Label: LP Club
- Past members: Vũ Đinh Trọng Thắng; Nguyễn Hùng Nam Anh; Phan Việt Hoàng; Trần Bình Tuấn; Nguyễn Chí Hùng
- Website: https://bannhacngot.com/ (defunct)

Ngọt was a Vietnamese indie pop rock group based in Hanoi. It was composed of four members: Vũ Đinh Trọng Thắng, Phan Việt Hoàng, Nguyễn Hùng Nam Anh and Hoàng Chí Trung. Since its formation in 2013, Ngọt became a prominent group in the Vietnamese indie rock scene.

The band released their first studio album of the same name in May 2016. Their second album, Ng`bthg, was released in September 2017, in which the single "Em dạo này" received positive reviews from fans and critics, helping the band win the Dedication Music Awards for "Song of the year" and "New Artist of the Year" at the 13th ceremony in 2018.

Their third album, 3, was released in October 2019 by LP Club, features a blend of funk and pop. Liveshow 3 (chương trình văn nghệ mới trẻ đặc sắc 2019) was the band's first nationwide tour, held in Ha Noi and Ho Chi Minh City, with the participation of many artists. Their fourth album, Gieo, was released by LP Club by the end of 2020.

On March 19, 2024, the band announced its disbandment and cancelled all future shows but no reason was provided.

== Career ==
=== 1995-2015: The early years ===
Vũ Đinh Trọng Thắng (also known as Thắng), Nguyễn Hùng Nam Anh and Trần Bình Tuấn (all born in 1995) had known each other since elementary school and have been playing music since attending Tay Son Middle School, Ha Noi. While Thắng came from a family with an artistic tradition and frequently performed, the other 2 members were completely self-taught. The group began performing at a cafe in Hanoi and gradually participated in various underground music performances in the city.

At the end of 2013, after graduating from high school, all three members decided to become a professional band, composing and performing their own works under the name "Ngọt". In 2014, they released their first songs on social media such as "Quan điểm" and "Đam mê", mostly recorded live at performance venues. "Cá hồi", released at the end of June 2014, was the first song the band recorded professionally in a studio. Positive feedback from the domestic indie community helped them to record the song "Khắp xung quanh", which was the band's first song broadcast on Vietnamese radio stations. Other compositions were also introduced on social media and were warmly received by the young community. A fan community was also created under the name "Kẹo".

Ngọt met Phan Việt Hoàng (born in 1991) at a cover performance of The Beatles in December 2012. Việt Hoàng was also contacted by the band for bass when they formed in November 2013, but it was not until he finished his studies aboard and returned to Vietnam in September 2015 that he officially joined the band when they started to record their first album Ngọt.

=== 2016-2018: Ngọt, Ng`bthg and their first tours ===
Most of Ngọt's song were composed by Vũ Đinh Trọng Thắng, with both music and lyrics written by him. The arrangements were done by all four members. Việt Hoàng was in charge of visuals and media relations. By the end of 2015, through social media, about US$1,900 were donated by the community to help the band produce their first album.

Ngọt's debut album was completed in Hanoi over a period of 5 months, starting in October 2015 and featured 10 songs. The recording and post-production process were supported by foreign experts. In April 2016, the band chose their new song "Cho tôi đi theo" to introduce the album, which continues to receive positive feedback. Nam Anh designed the album cover with the help of other members.

The album was officially released on May 13, 2016. 1,000 copies were sold in just the first four days. After 3 months of release, 1,500 CDs had been sold, along with 2,000 digital copies downloaded through online distribution channels. Following this unexpected success, they had a re-release accompanied by a small-scale live show was held by the band in mid-May at REC Room, Hanoi. Subsequently, shows in Da Nang and Ho Chi Minh City were also held throughout the summer. On September 9, Ngọt released their first official single, "Không làm gì", directed by Scott Homan and produced by Banana Island TV.

October 2016, Bình Tuấn left the band to study aboard. Nguyễn Chí Hùng was selected to be the lead guitarist, and was also responsible for recording and sound engineering.

January 2017, Ngọt began preparing for their second studio album, titled Ng`bthg. Not long after, they sold out a total of 500 tickets for their 2 shows at Paris, France, in April that year. More than 3,000 tickets for the band's first nationwide tour in Hanoi and Ho Chi Minh were also sold in August.

On September 9, 2017, Ng`bthg was officially released to fans, selling 4,000 copies. The recording and production process were done by 4 members of the band. Live shows introducing the album were held in Hanoi and Ho Chi Minh City, attracting significant media attention. Ngọt continued their success with over 2,000 digital downloads from online platforms. October 11, the band released the single "Em dạo này", which reached the top 8 on the YouTube Trending chart with over 800,000 views in just over a week.

Ngọt is also one of the three artists representing Vietnam to perform at the Monsoon International Music Festival 2017. They also experimented with many musical genres, most notably participating in the hip-hop music programs Tử Tế 6 and Tử Tế 7 in Hanoi.

Live show Ngọt - In the Spotlight was held by the band on November 24, 2018, at the Vietnam-Soviet Friendship Palace of Culture and Labour, produced by Mỹ Thanh Company.

=== 2019-2022: 3 ===
On October 2019, Ngọt released their album 3 (full name being 3 (tuyển tập nhạc Ngọt mới trẻ sôi động 2019)) after a long time of preparations. This album was conceived by the band right after finishing the Ng`bthg tour 2 years earlier.

With 14 songs, Ngọt has brought in a new style and form with every song having a different story. Two songs that reflects this idea the most are specifically "Lần cuối (đi bên em xót xa người ơi)" and "Chuyển kênh (sản phẩm này không phải là thuốc)", as they received much praise from listeners. In the past, Ngọt has shared that this album had matured their sense of music.

== Works ==
=== Albums ===
- 2016 – Ngọt
- 2017 – Ng`bthg
- 2019 – 3 (tuyển tập nhạc Ngọt mới trẻ sôi động 2019)
- 2022 – Gieo

=== EPs ===
- 2019 – Cñgđc
- 2021 – Ở đài truyền hình
- 2024 February 23 – Suýt 1
- 2024 August 30 – Suýt 2

=== Singles ===
- 2014 – Cá Hồi
- 2015 – Khắp Xung Quanh
- 2017 – Cho Tôi Lang Thang (Collaboration with Đen)
- 2019 – LẦN CUỐI (đi bên em xót xa người ơi)
- 2019 – CHUYỂN KÊNH (sản phẩm này không phải là thuốc)
- 2020 – Tìm Người Nhà
- 2021 – Đốt
- 2021 – để quên
- 2021 – Em trang trí
- 2022 – Mấy khi
- 2022 – Thấy chưa
