= List of string instruments =

This is a list of string instruments.

== Bowed ==
- Agiarut (Alaska)
- Ainu fiddle (Ainu)
- Ajaeng (Korea)
- Alexander violin (United States)
- Anzad (Tuareg)
- Apache fiddle (Apache)
- Apkhyarta (Abkhazia)
- Arpeggione (Austrian)
- Banhu (China)
- Baryton (Austrian)
- Bazantar (United States)
- Bowed dulcimer (German)
- Bowed guitar (London)
- Bowed psaltery (United States)
- Byzaanchy (Tuva)
- Byzantine lyra (Greece)
- Calabrian Lira (Italy)
- Cello (Italian)
- Cello da spalla (Italy)
- Chagane (Azerbaijan)
- Chikara (India)
- Chiwang (Bhutan)
- Chrotta (Wales)
- Chuniri (Georgia)
- Cimboa (Cape Verde)
- Cizhonghu (China)
- Cornstalk fiddle (United States)
- Cretan lyra (Greece)
- Crwth (Wales)
- Daguangxian (China)
- Dahu (China)
- Dakkari (Nepal)
- Dan gao (Vietnam)
- Dan ho (Vietnam)
- Dan nhi (Vietnam)
- Datong (China)
- Daxophone (German)
- Dhantara (India)
- Dihu (China)
- Dilruba (India)
- Division viol (England)
- Diyingehu (China)
- Donskoy ryley (Russia)
- Double bass
- Drejelire
- Ducheke (Amur)
- Duda (Latvia)
- Dudumanku (Russia)
- Endingidi (Uganda)
- Enneg (Mexico)
- Erhu (China)
- Erxian (China)
- Esraj (India)
- Fiddle
- Fiðla (Icelandic)
- Fidola (United States)
- Gadulka (Bulgaria)
- Gaohu (China)
- Gehu (China)
- Ghaychak (Iran)
- Ģīga (Latvia)
- Giga (Norway)
- Goje (Mali)
- Gudok (Russia)
- Gue (Shetland)
- Gunjac (Croatia)
- Gusle (bulkans)
- Haegeum (Korea)
- Hardanger fiddle (Norway)
- Huluhu (China)
- Huqin (China)
- Hurdy-gurdy (Italy, Spain, and France)
- Igil (Tuva)
- Imzad (Africa)
- Jap fiddle (UK/USA)
- Jiaohu (China)
- Jingerhu (China)
- Jinghu (China)
- Jouhikko (Finland)
- Joze (Iraq)
- Kaisatsuko (Japan)
- Kamancheh (Iran)
- Kemane of Cappadocia (Greece)
- Kemenche (Turkey)
- Kendara (India)
- Kezaixian (Japan)
- Kingri (India)
- Kobyz (Kazakhstan)
- Kokyū (Japan)
- Kongahyan (Java)
- Kontra (Hungary)
- Krem (Jah hut)
- K'ni (Vietnam)
- Kukkuma (Hausa)
- Langspil (Iceland)
- Laruan (China)
- Latfiol (Sweden)
- Leiqin (China)
- Lijerica (Croatia)
- Lira (Ukraine)
- Lira da braccio (Italy)
- Lirone (Italy)
- Liujiaoxian (China)
- Lokanga bara (Madagascar)
- Lyra viol (England)
- Macedonian lyra (Greece)
- Maguhu (China)
- Masenqo (Ethiopia)
- Moraharpa (Sweden)
- Morin khuur (Mongolia)
- Musical saw
- Nail violin (Germany)
- Ninera (Slovakia)
- Niutuiqin (China)
- Nyckelharpa (Sweden)
- N'vike (Quechua)
- Octobass (France)
- Organistrum
- Orutu (East Africa)
- Pardessus de viole (Italy)
- Pena (India)
- Philomel (Italy, France, and Germany)
- Phonofiddle (England)
- Pinaka veena (India)
- Pochette (England)
- Psalmodikon (Sweden, Norway)
- Psaltry
- Qelutviaq (Alaska)
- Quinton (France)
- Rabeca (Portugal)
- Rabel (Spain)
- Ravanahatha (India)
- Rebab (Afghanistan, Pakistan and India)
- Rebec
- Salo (Thailand)
- Sanhu (China)
- Sanshin (Japan)
- Sanxian (China)
- Sarangi (India)
- Nepali Sarangi (Nepal)
- Sarinda (India)
- Saw bang (Thailand)
- Saw duang (Thailand)
- Saw sam sai (Thailand)
- Saw u (Thailand)
- Segankuru (Botswana)
- Shamisen (Japan)
- Shanz (Mongolia)
- Sihu (China)
- Sohaegeum (North Korea)
- Soku (Mali)
- Sorahi (Iran)
- Streichmelodion (Moravia)
- Suroz (Balochistan)
- Swedish Double-decker (Sweden)
- Talharpa (Estonia, Sweden)
- Tar shehnai (India)
- Taus (India)
- Tautirut (Inuit)
- Tenor violin
- Tihu (Cantonese)
- Tiqin (China)
- Traskofiol (Sweden)
- Tro (Cambodia)
- Tro Khmer (Cambodia)
- Tromba marina
- Tuhu (China)
- T'yngryng (Russia)
- Ukelin (United States)
- Vielle
- Vielle à roue et à manche (France)
- Viol (viola da gamba)
- Viola
- Viola d'amore (Italy)
- Viola da braccio (Italy)
- Viola organista
- Viola pomposa
- Violetta
- Violin
- Violino piccolo
- Violinzither (Germany)
- Waterphone (United States)
- Wheelharp (United States)
- Xiqin (China)
- Yakatat (Alaska)
- Yaylı tambur (Turkey)
- Yazheng (China)
- Yehu (China)
- Zhengni (China)
- Zhonghu (China)
- Zhuihu (China)

== Plucked or strummed ==
- Aarbajo (Nepal)
- Ahenk (Turkey)
- Ajayu (Chile)
- Akonting (West Africa)
- Angélique (France)
- Appalachian dulcimer (United States)
- Archlute
- Asor (Hebrew)
- Auto-harp
  - Chromaharp
- Bağlama (Turkey)
- Bajo quinto and Bajo sexto (Mexico)
- Balalaika (Russia)
  - Descant balalaika
  - Piccolo balalaika
  - Prima balalaika
  - Secunda balalaika
  - Alto balalaika
  - Tenor balalaika
  - Bass balalaika
  - Contrabass balalaika
- Bandol (Trinidad and Tobago)
- Bandolón (Mexico)
- Bandura (Ukraine)
- Bandurria (Spain)
- Banjo (United States)
  - Banjo cello
  - Banjolin
  - Banjulele
  - Bass banjo
  - Bluegrass banjo (5-string banjo)
  - Contrabass banjo
  - Electric banjo
  - Fretless banjo
  - Guitanjo
  - Long neck banjo
  - Plectrum banjo
  - Tenor banjo
- Barbat (Iran)
- Basolia (Ukraine and Poland)
- Bass guitar
  - Electric bass guitar
  - Acoustic bass guitar
- Begena (Ethiopia)
- Biwa (Japanese)
- Bordonua (Puerto Rico)
- Bouzouki (Greece)
  - Trichorda
  - Tetrachorda
  - Irish bouzouki
- Brac
- Bugarija (Croatia)
- Buzuq (Lebanon)
- Cak (Indonesia)
- Cavaquinho (Portugal and Brazil)
- Cekuntrung (Indonesia)
- Çeng (Turkey)
- Cetera (Italy)
- Ceterone (Italy)
- Chapey (Cambodia)
- Charango (Bolivia)
  - Charango bajo
  - Hualaycho
  - Ronroco
  - Charangón
  - Chillador
  - Hatun charango
  - Ranka charango
- Chardha (Afghanistan, Pakistan)
- Chelys (Greece)
- Chilili
- Chitarra battente (Italy)
- Chitarrone (Mexico)
- Chitrali sitar (Pakistan)
- Chonguri (Azerbaijan, Georgia)
- Çifteli (Albania)
- Citole
- Cittern (Early Modern Britain)
  - Bell cittern
- Concheras (Mexico)
  - Mandolina conchera or concheras de mandolinas
  - Vihuela conchera or concheras de vihuelas
  - Guitarra conchera or concheras de guirarras
- Crwth (Wales)
- Cuatro antiguo
- Cuatro cubano
- Cuatro (Puerto Rico and Venezuela)
  - Puerto Rican cuatro
  - Venezuela cuatro
- Cuk (Indonesia)
- Cümbüş (Turkey)
  - Tamburo cümbüş
- Cura (Turkey)
- Cythara
- Đàn bầu (Vietnam)
- Đàn đáy (Vietnam)
- Đàn nguyệt (Vietnam)
- Đàn tam (Vietnam)
- Đàn tính (Vietnam)
- Đàn tranh (Vietnam)
- Ðàn Tre (Vietnam)
- Đàn tứ (Vietnam)
- Đàn tỳ bà (Vietnam)
- Diddley bow (United States)
- Dombra (Eastern Europe and Central Asia)
- Domra (Russia)
  - Piccolo Domra
  - Prims DomraPrima:
  - Soprano DomraSoprano: b e1 a1[4]
  - Alto DomraAlto: e a d1[5]
  - Tenor DomraTenor: B e a[6]
  - Bass DomraBass: E A d[7]
  - Contrabass Domra (major)
  - Contrabass Domra (minor)
- Doshpuluur (Tuva)
- Dotar
- Dotara (Bangladesh)
- Double bass
- Dramyin (Himalayas)
- Dulcimer
- Duo'Lectar (United States)
- Dutar (Persia)
- Duxianqin (China)
- Ek Tare (Nepal)
- Ektara (India)
- Endongo (Uganda)
- Epinette des vosges (France)
- Gabusi (Yemen)
- Gayageum (Korea)
- Geomungo (Korea)
- Geyerleier (Germany)
- Gittern
- Gottan (Japan)
- Gottuvadhyam (India)
- Gravikord
- Gubguba (India)
- Guitalin (United States)
- Guitar (Spain)
  - Acoustic bass guitar
  - Alto guitar
  - Armónico
  - Banjitar
  - Baritone guitar
  - Bass guitar
  - Cigar box guitar
  - Classical guitar
  - Eight-string guitar
  - Electric guitar
  - Flamenco guitar
  - Guitalele
  - Harp guitar
  - Nine-string guitar
  - Octave guitar
  - Dobro
  - Seven-string guitar
  - Tailed bridge guitar
  - Tenor guitar
  - Ten-string guitar
  - Twelve-string guitar
- Guitaro
- Guitarrón argentino (Argentina)
- Guitarrón mexicano (Mexico)
- Guitarrón chileno (Chile)
- Guqin (China)
- Gusli (Russia)
- Guzheng (China)
- Harp
  - Chromatic harp
  - Electric harp
  - Folk harp
  - Pedal Harp (a.k.a. concert harp)
  - Triple harp
- Harpsichord (Europe, keyboard instrument)
- Hu hu (China)
- Huapanguera (Mexico)
- Huobosi (China)
- Ichigenkin (Japan)
- Idiochord (Latin)
- Inanga (Burundi)
- Janzi (Uganda)
- Jarana huasteca (Mexico)
- Jarana jarocha
  - Jarana jarocha requinto
- Kabosy (Madagascar)
- Kacapi (Indonesia)
- Kanklės (Lithuania)
- Kannel (Estonia)
- Kantele (Finland)
- Kanun (Middle East, Persia, Greece)
- Karantouzeni (Greece)
- Khamak (India)
- Khonkhota (Bolivia)
- Koboz (Hungary)
- Kobza (Ukraine)
- Kokles (Latvia)
- Konghou (China)
- Kontigi (Nigeria)
- Komuz (Kyrgyzstan)
- Kora (West Africa)
- Koto (Japan)
- Krar (Eritrea)
- Kse diev (Cambodia)
- Kumuz (Kyrgyzstan)
- Kutiyapi (Philippines)
- Kwitra (Algeria)
- Langeleik (Norway)
- Laouto (Greece)
- Laúd (Spain, Cuba, Philippines)
- Lavta (Istanbul)
- Leona (Mexico)
- Liuqin (China)
- Liuto cantabile (Italy)
- Luc huyen cam (Vietnam)
- Lute (Europe)
  - Harp lute
  - Swedish lute
  - Archlute
  - Theorbo
- Lyra (Crete)
- Lyre (Greece)
- Mandolin (Italy)
  - Electric mandolin
  - Mandola ("tenor mandola", in the UK)
  - Mandocello
  - Mandolin-banjo
  - Mandobass
  - Octave mandolin ("Irish bouzouki")
  - Piccolo mandolin
  - Tremolo bass
  - Mandore
  - Mandolute
  - Mandriola
  - Mandotar
- Mbira (Zimbabwe)
- Mejorana (Panama)
- Monochord
- Nevoud (Turkey)
- Ngombi (Central Africa)
- Ngoni (West Africa)
- Nigenkin (Japan)
- Nyatiti (Kenya)
- Octavina (Philippines)
- Octofone (United States)
- Oud (Egypt, Greece)
- Oungum (North Korea)
- Pandura (Greece)
- Panduri (Georgia)
- Pararayki (Ainu)
- Pedal steel guitar (United States)
- Penorcon
- Phandar (Chechnya)
- Phorminx (Greece)
- Pipa (China)
- Portuguese guitar (Portugal)
- Psaltery
- Qanun (Egypt, Persia, Greece)
- Qiftelia (Kosovo)
- Qinqin (China)
- Rawap (Uyghur)
- Rajao (Portugal)
- Requinto (Portugal, Spain)
- Ronroco (Bolivia)
- Rotte (lyre) (historic NW Europe)
- Rotte (psaltery) (historic Europe)
- Ruan (China)
- Rubab (Central Asia)
  - Pamiri rubab (Tajikistan)
- Rudra veena (India)
- Russian guitar
- Sallaneh (Iran)
- Salterio (Mexico)
- Sambuca
- Sanshin (Okinawa, Japan)
- Sanxian (China)
- Sapeh (Borneo)
- Saraswati veena (India)
- Šargija (Albania)
- Sarod (India)
- Sasando (Indonesia)
- Saung (Burma)
- Saz (Turkey)
- Scheitholt (Germany)
- Seni rebab (India)
- Setar (Iran)
- Shamisen (Japan)
- Shashtar
- Sitar (India)
  - Surbahar
- Socavon (Panama)
- Stoessel lute (Germany)
- Strumstick (United States)
- Swarabat (India)
- Tamboori (India)
- Tambouras (Byzantine)
- Tambura (Bulgaria)
- Tamburica
- Tanbur (Turkey)
- Tanpura (India)
- Tarhu
- Tarica (Europe)
- Tar
- Tati
- Tea chest bass
- Tembor
- Tidinet
- Timple (Canary Islands)
- Tiple (North and South America)
  - American tiple
  - Tiple Colombiano
  - Tiple Colombiano requinto
  - Puerto Rican tiple
- Torban (Ukraine)
- Tovshuur (Mongolia)
- Tremoloa
  - Hawaiian tremoloa
- Tres (Cuba)
  - Cuban tres (Cuba)
  - Puerto Rican Tres (Puerto Rico)
- Tricordia (Mexico)
- Tritantri vina
- Tungna
- Tzouras (Greece)
- Ukulele (Hawaii)
  - Banjolele
  - Baritone ukulele
  - Bass ukulele
  - Concert ukulele
  - Taropatch (a.k.a. lili'u)
  - Tahitian ukulele (Tahiti)
  - Tenor ukulele
- Valiha (Madagascar)
- Veena (India)
  - Mohan veena
  - Ranjan veena
  - Sagar veena (Pakistan)
    - Triveni veena
- Vichitra veena (India)
- Vihuela (Mexico)
- Vihuela (Spain)
- Viola amarantina (Portugal)
- Viola beiroa (Portugal)
- Viola braguesa (Portugal)
- Viola caipira (Brazil)
- Viola campanica (Portugal)
- Viola da terra (the Azores)
- Viola de arame (Portugal)
- Viola de cocho (Brazil)
- Viola da Terceira (Azores)
- Viola toeira (Portugal)
- Violin
- Walaycho (the Andes)
- Waldzither (Germany)
- Xalam (West Africa)
- Yaybahar (Turkey)
- Yueqin (China)
- Zheng (China)
- Zhongruan (China)
- Zhu (China)
- Zither
  - Alpine zither (Central Europe)
  - Concert zither (United States)
  - Guitar zither
  - Spitzharfe (Germany)

== Struck or tapped ==
- Berimbau (Brazil)
- Bobre (Mauritius)
- Cimbalom (Hungary, Slovakia, Czech Republic, Romania)
- Chapman stick (United States)
  - Chapman Stick
  - Grand Stick
  - Bass Stick
- Chitarra battente, a.k.a. "knocking guitar" (Italy)
- Clavichord (keyboard instrument)
- Clavinet (electric keyboard instrument)
- Đàn tam thập lục (Vietnam)
- Fiddlesticks
- Hammered dulcimer
- Harpejji (United States)
- Jhallari (India)
- Khim (Thailand and Cambodia)
- Piano (Keyboard instrument)
- Santur/Santoor (Persia, India, Pakistan, Greece)
- Tsymbaly (Ukraine)
- Utogardon (Hungary)
- Warr guitar (United States)
- Yanggeum (Korea)
- Yangqin (China)

== Other methods ==
- Aeolian harp (air movement)
- Long String Instrument, (by Ellen Fullman, strings are rubbed in, and vibrate in the longitudinal mode)
- Magnetic resonance piano, (strings activated by electromagnetic fields)

== Stringed instruments with keyboards ==
=== Struck ===
- Clavichord
  - Clavinet
- Piano
  - Fortepiano
  - Pedal Piano
  - Harmonichord
  - Tangent piano
  - Orphica

=== Plucked ===
- Akkordolia
- Benju
- Bulbul tarang
- Clavicymbalum
- Harpsichord
  - Archicembalo
  - Lautenwerck
  - Spinet
  - Virginal
- Shahi baaja
- Taishōgoto
- Xenorphica

=== Bowed ===
- Nyckelharpa
- Hurdy-gurdy
- Viola organista
  - Wheelharp

=== Other/hybrid ===
- Magnetic resonance piano

== Stringed instruments by country ==
- Afghanistan (Rubab)
- Africa (regional):
  - Hhajhuj (Sentir) (North Africa)
  - Kibangala (Gabusi) (East Africa)
  - Kora (West Africa)
  - Kwitra (Kouitra)
  - Loutar (Central North Africa)
  - Ngoni (West and Central Africa)
  - Oud arbi (Northern Africa)
  - Ramkie (Southern Africa)
- Albania:
  - Qiftelia
  - Šargija
  - Sharki (Sharkia)
- Algeria:
  - Kwitra
  - Mondol (Mandole)
- Argentina:
  - Guitarrón Argentino
- Asia (regional):
  - Dombra (Central Asia)
- Austria:
  - Schrammel gitarre (Contraguitar)
  - Xenorphica (Harp Piano)
  - Zither (Alpine Zither)
- Azores:
  - Viola da terceira
  - Viola da terra
- Bangladesh:
  - Dotara
  - Gopichand
- Benelux:
  - Hommel
  - Vlier
  - Épinette
  - Hakkebord
- Bhutan:
  - Chiwang
- Bolivia:
  - Charango
  - Chillador
  - Khonkhota
  - Ronroco
- Borneo:
  - Kecapi dayak
  - Sapeh
  - Sundatang
- Bosnia:
  - Bugarija
  - Šargija
  - Saz (Bosnian saz)
- Brazil:
  - Berimbau
  - Cavaquinho
  - Craviola
  - Bahian guitar
  - Viola caipira
  - Viola de cocho
  - Violão de sete cordas
- Bulgaria:
  - Gadulka
  - Tambura (Tamboura)
- Burma:
  - Saung
  - Migyaung
- Burundi:
  - Inanga (Burundian zither)
- Cambodia:
  - Chapey
  - Khim
  - Tro
- Canada:
  - Mandolinetto
- Canary Islands:
  - Timple
- Cape Verde:
  - Viola de dez cordas
- Chile:
  - Guitarrón Chileno
- China:
  - Banhu
  - Cizhonghu
  - Diyingehu
  - Dong pipa
  - Erhu
  - Erxian
  - Gaohu
  - Gehu
  - Guqin (Ku chin)
  - Guzheng
  - Huluhu
  - Huqin (family of bowed lutes)
  - Huobusi
  - Jinghu
  - Laruan
  - Leiqin
  - Liuqin
  - Maguhu
  - Nanyin pipa
  - Pipa
  - Qiqin
  - Ruan
  - Sanshin
  - Sanxian
  - Sihu
  - Tianqin
  - Yángqín (Chinese hammered dulcimer)
  - Yazheng
  - Yehu
  - Yueqin (Yueh qin; moon guitar)
  - Zheng
  - Zhonghu
  - Zhongruan
  - Zhu
  - Zhuihu
- Colombia:
  - Bandola Andina Colombiana
  - Tiple Colombiano
  - Tiple Colombiano Requinto
- Comoros:
  - Gabusi
- Congo:
  - Karindula
  - Lindanda
- Corsica:
  - Cetera
- Crete:
  - Lyra
- Croatia:
  - Berda
  - Bisernica
  - Brac
  - Bugarija
  - Celo (Celovic)
  - Gunjac
  - Gusle
  - Tambura samica (Dangubica)
  - Tamburitza
- Cuba:
  - Armónico
  - Cuban cuatro
  - Laúd cubano
  - Tres cubano
- Ecuador
  - Bandolin
- Eritrea:
  - Krar
- Estonia:
  - Kannel
- Ethiopia:
  - Masenqo
  - Begena
- Europe (regional):
  - Clavichord (Central Europe)
  - Dombra (Eastern Europe)
  - Guitar Zither(Central Europe)
  - Harpsichord (Central Europe)
  - Hurdy-gurdy (Western Europe)
  - Lute
  - Piano (Central & Southern Europe)
  - Tamburitza (Central Europe)
  - Tarica
- Finland:
  - Jouhikko
  - Kannel
  - Kantele
- France:
  - Epinette des Vosges
  - Harp (Concert harp; Pedal harp)
  - Hurdy-gurdy
- Gambia:
  - Akonting
- Germany:
  - Akkordolia
  - Hackbrett
  - Hammered dulcimer
  - Rotte
  - Scheitholt
  - Waldzither
  - Zither (Alpine zither)
- Ghana:
  - Molo
- Great Britain
  - Cittern
- Greece:
  - Baglama
  - Bouzouki
  - Laghouto
  - Laouto
  - Lyre
  - Oud
  - Phorminx
  - Tabouras
  - Tzouras (Tsoura; Jura)
- Hungary:
  - Cimbalom
  - Citera
  - Kobza (Kobaz)
- Iceland:
  - Langspil
- India:
  - Bulbul tarang
  - Ālāpiṇī vīṇā
  - Ektara
  - Esraj
  - Gottuvadhyam veena (Gottu vadyam) (south India)
  - Mahanataka veena
  - Mohan veena
  - Pinaka vina
  - Ravanahatha
  - Rudra veena
  - Santoor
  - Sarangi
  - Saraswati veena(south India)
  - Sarinda
  - Sarod
  - Seni rabab
  - Sitar
  - Surbahar (Bass sitar)
  - Sursingar
  - Tanpura (Tampura)
  - Tati (Nagaland)
  - Tumbi (north India)
  - Veena
  - Vichitra veena
  - Villu Paatu
- Indonesia (see also Borneo):
  - Bijol
  - Cak (Cuk; Keroncong guitar)
  - Dambus
  - Gambus selodang
  - Hasapi
  - Jungga
  - Kacapi (Sundanese)(Java)
  - Kecapi makassar (Sulawesi)
  - Kulcapi karo
  - Rebab (Java)
  - Sasando
  - Situr (Java, Bali)
- Iran (Persia):
  - Barbat
  - Chang (Harp)
  - Dutar
  - Ghaychak
  - Kamancheh
  - Mugni
  - Qanun
  - Rubab
  - Rud
  - Sallaneh
  - Santur
  - Sāz
  - Setar
  - Shahrud
  - Shurangiz
  - Sorahi
  - Tanbur
  - Tar
- Iraq:
  - Qanún/kanun
  - Santur/Santoor
- Ireland:
  - Celtic harp
  - Irish bouzouki (Octave mandolin)
- Italy:
  - Calabrian Lira (Calabria)
  - Chitarra battente ("knocking guitar")
  - Chitarrone
  - Liuto cantabile (Naples)
  - Mandolin (Mandolin family)
- Japan:
  - Biwa
  - Ichigenkin
  - Gekkin
  - Gottan
  - Kokyū
  - Koto
  - Nigenkin
  - Shamisen
  - Sanshin
  - Taishogoto
  - Tonkori
- Kazakhstan:
  - Kobyz
- Kenya:
  - Nyatiti
  - Orutu
- Korea:
  - Ajaeng
  - Dang bipa
  - Gayageum
  - Geomungo
  - Haegeum
  - Hyang bipa
  - Komungo
  - Yanggeum
- Kyrgyzstan:
  - Kormuz
- Latvia:
  - kokles
- Lebanon:
  - Buzuq
- Lithuania:
  - kanklės
- Macedonia:
  - Tambura
- Madagascar:
  - Kabosy
  - Llokango voatavo
  - Valiha
- Madeira:
  - Braguinha (Machete de braga)
  - Rajão
  - Viola de arame (Viola da Madeira)
- Malaysia (see also Borneo):
  - Gambus
  - Gambus Melayu
  - Sape
- Malawi:
  - Bangwe
- Mali:
  - Goje
- Malta:
  - Terzin kitarra
- Mexico:
  - Bajo quinto and Bajo sexto
  - Cartonal
  - Guitarra conchera
  - Guitarra de golpe
  - Guitarra de son (Requinto jarocho)
  - Guitarra doble
  - Guitarra séptima
  - Guitarrón mexicano (Guitarrón)
  - Huapanguera
  - Jarana huasteca
  - Jarana jarocha
  - Mandolina conchera
  - Requinto
  - Salterio (Mexico)
  - Tricordia
  - Vihuela conchera
  - Vihuela (Mexican vihuela)
- Mongolia:
  - Morin khuur
  - Naxi (Sugudu; Hubo; Huobusi)
  - Sshanz (Shudraga)
  - Tobshuur
  - Topshur(Khomys)
- Morocco:
  - Gunbri
  - Gunibri
  - Lotar
- Nepal:
  - Sarangi
- Nigeria:
  - Kontigi
- Norway:
  - Hardingfele (Hardanger fiddle)
  - Langeleik
- Panama:
  - Mejoranera
  - Socavon (Bocona)
- Peru:
  - Bandurria
  - Charango
- Philippines:
  - Banduria
  - Fegereng (Tiruray)
  - Kitara
  - Kudyapi
  - Kudlung (Kudyapi; Fagelung)
  - Kutiyapi (Maguindanao)
  - Laud
  - Octavina
- Portugal (see also Azores and Madeira):
  - Bandolim
  - Banjolim
  - Cavaquinho
  - Guitarra portuguesa (Portuguese guitar)
  - Rajao
  - Viola amarantina
  - Violão baixa
  - Viola beiroa
  - Viola braguesa
  - Viola campaniça
  - Viola de arame
  - Viola de fado
  - Viola toeira
- Puerto Rico:
  - Bordonúa
  - Cuatro (Puerto Rican cuatro)
  - Tiple (Puerto Rican tiple)
  - Tres (Puerto Rican tres)
- Romania:
  - Cobza
  - Kontra
  - Horn-violin
- Russia (see also Tuva):
  - Balalaika
  - Domra
  - Guitar (Russian guitar)
  - Gudok
  - Gusli
- Rwanda:
  - Inanga
- Sardinia:
  - Kithera sarda
- Senegal:
  - Akonting
- Serbia:
  - Berda
  - Bisernica
  - Brac
  - Bugarija
  - Celo (Celovic)
  - Tambura samica (Dangubica)
- Slovenia:
  - Drone zither
- Spain:
  - Bandurria
  - Guitar (Spanish guitar)
  - Guitar (Flamenco guitar)
  - Guitarro (Guitarrico)
  - Laúd
  - Vihuela
- Sri Lanka:
  - Ravanahatha
- Sweden:
  - Hummel
  - Nyckelharpa
  - Swedish Double-decker
- Tahiti:
  - Tahitian ukulele
- Taiwan:
  - Yueqin taiwan
- Tanzania:
  - Zeze
- Thailand:
  - Grajappi
  - Jakhay
  - Khim
  - Phin
  - Saw sam sai
  - Sueng
  - Sung lisu (Subu)
- Turkey:
  - Bağlama
  - Çeng
  - Cümbüş
  - Kemenche
  - Nevoud
  - Saz
  - Turkish tambur
  - Yaylı tambur
- Tunisia:
  - Gambara
  - Gumbri
- Tuva:
  - Chanzy
  - Doshpuluur
  - Igil
- Ukraine:
  - Bandura
  - Kobza
  - Starosvitska bandura
  - Torban
  - Tsymbaly
- United States of America:
  - (see also Puerto Rico)
  - Appalachian dulcimer
  - Auto-harp
  - Banjo
  - Bazantar
  - Bowed psaltery
  - Chapman stick
  - Clavinet
  - Diddley bow
  - Fiddle
  - Guitalele
  - Guitar (electric guitar, bass guitar)
  - Guitar zither
  - Harp guitar
  - Hawaiian guitar
  - Octofone
  - Octobass
  - Pedal steel guitar
  - Psaltry (Bowed psaltry)
  - Resophonic guitar (Dobro; Delvecchio; Triolian)
  - Steel Guitar (Hawaii) (Lap steel guitar)
  - Strumstick
  - Taropatch (Tenor ukulele)
  - Tenor violin
  - Tiple (American tiple)
  - Ukulele (Hawaii)
  - Zither (Concert zither)
- Venezuela:
  - Bandola llanera
  - Bandola oriental
  - Cuatro
  - Cinco
  - Cinco y medio
  - Seis
- Vietnam:
  - Đàn bầu
  - Đàn day
  - Đàn doan (Dan nhat; Dan tu)
  - Đàn gáo
  - Dan ghita (Luc huyen cam; Vong co guitar)
  - Đàn nguyệt (Dan kim)
  - Đàn sen
  - Đàn tam
  - Đàn thập lục
  - Dan tinh
  - Đàn tranh
  - Đàn tỳ bà
  - K'ni
  - Luc huyen cam
- Wales:
  - Crwth
  - Neola
- Zambia:
  - Karindula

== See also ==
- List of guitars
