= Chorus (audio effect) =

Audio effect

Chorus is an audio effect that occurs when individual sounds with approximately the same time, and very similar pitches, converge. While similar sounds coming from multiple sources can occur naturally, as in the case of a choir or string orchestra, it can also be simulated using an electronic effects unit or signal processing device.

When the effect is produced successfully, none of the constituent sounds are perceived as being out of tune. It is characteristic of sounds with a rich, shimmering quality that would be absent if the sound came from a single source. The shimmer occurs because of beating. The effect is more apparent when listening to sounds that sustain for longer periods of time; by adding additional signals with similar but slightly varying pitches over time to the original signal, it creates the illusion that the timbre, not the pitch of the played note, changes.

The chorus effect is especially easy to hear when listening to a choir or string ensemble. A choir has multiple people singing each part (alto, tenor, etc.). A string ensemble has multiple violinists and possibly multiple other stringed instruments.

== Acoustically created ==
Although most acoustic instruments cannot produce a chorus effect by themselves, some instruments (particularly chordophones with multiple courses of strings) can produce it as part of their own design. The effect can make these acoustic instruments sound fuller and louder than by using a single tone generator (b.e.: a single vibrating string or a reed). Some examples:

- Piano – Each of the hammers strikes a course of multiple strings tuned to nearly the same pitch (for all notes except the bass notes). Professional piano tuners carefully control the mistuning of each string to add movement without losing clarity. However, in some poorly cared-for instruments (like the honky-tonk pianos), the effect is more prominent.
- Santur (and similar coursed-hammered dulcimers) – As well as on the piano, the player can strike (by using a pair of manual hammers instead) a course of multiple strings tuned to nearly the same pitch. As the instrument is frequently tuned by the musicians themselves (rather than by professional tuners), the chorus effect is more easily heard than on the piano.
- 12-string guitar, bajo sexto and Greek bouzouki – Courses with pairs of strings, tuned in octaves and unisons, create a distinctive complex shimmer. In the 12-string guitar, this effect is often accentuated by the use of open and modal tunings, such as open-G and DADGAD.
- Colombian tiple, guitarrón chileno and tricordia – Courses of 3 (or more) strings, tuned in octaves and unisons, create a more complex shimmer and a fuller effect.
- Mandolin, lute and oud – Courses with pairs of identically tuned strings, as opposed to octaves and unisons on the 12-string guitar.
- Accordion – two or three reed blocks tuned to nearly the same pitch, but with one a bit sharp, produce a unique and distinctive "musette" sound exclusive to the accordion, colloquially called a "wet" sound.
- Pipe organ – The voix céleste [Fr.] (heavenly voice) is an organ stop consisting of either one or two ranks of pipes slightly out of tune. The term celeste refers to a rank of pipes detuned slightly so as to produce a beating effect when combined with a normally tuned rank. It is also used to refer to a compound stop of two or more ranks in which the ranks are detuned relative to each other.

However, while the open strings of a standard-tuned guitar (or any single-stringed instrument like ukuleles, banjos, etc.) can't produce any chorus effect, it can also be obtained by the use of alternative tunings (such as the unisons-and-octaves-only "ostrich tuning" by Lou Reed); by playing chords or fingerings with "redundant" notes (like playing the open high E string and the same "E" note on the 5th fret of the B string); and/or by using extended techniques like bending while playing a note (like playing the 5th fret on the 2nd string and, simultaneously, playing a full-tone bending in the 7th fret on the 3rd string).

Ensembles of instruments and voices can produce a natural chorus effect, such as with a string orchestra or choir.

== Electronic effect ==
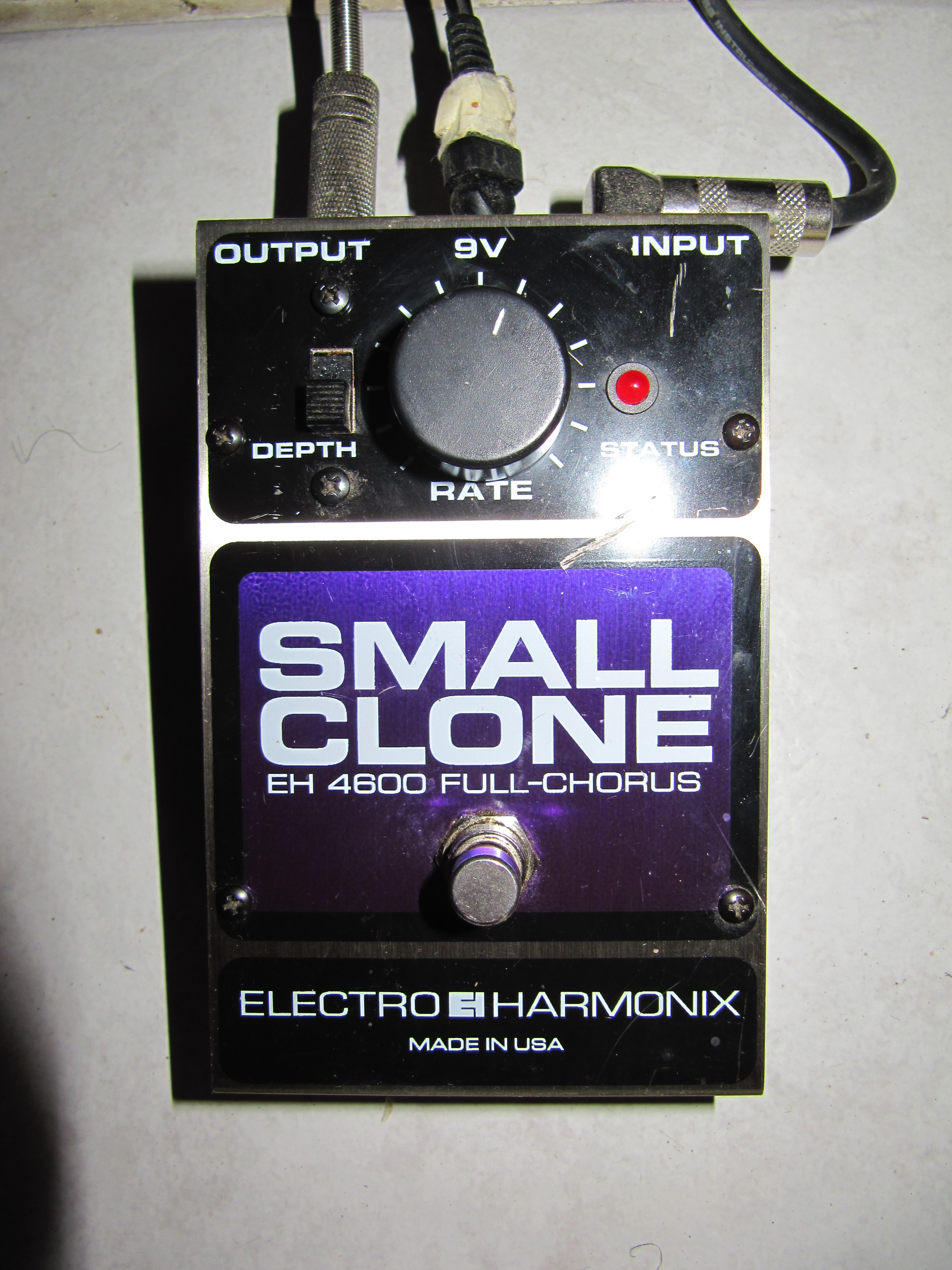
Example of an Electro-Harmonix Small Clone chorus pedal

Chorus effect
The chorus effect comes from an Electro-Harmonix Small Clone.

Chorus, flanger and delay in stereo
Chorus, flanger and delay in stereo on electric guitar, produced with the multi-effects unit Zoom G3.

The chorus effect can be simulated by a range of electronic and digital effects units and signal processing equipment, including software effects. The signal processor may be software running on a computer, software running in a digital effect processor, or an analog effect processor. If the processor is hardware-based, it may be packaged as a pedal, a rack-mount module, a table-top device, built into an instrument amplifier (often an acoustic guitar amplifier or an electric guitar amplifier), or even built into some electronic instruments, such as synthesizers, electronic pianos and Hammond organs.

The effect is achieved by taking an audio signal and mixing it with one or more delayed copies of itself. The pitch of the added voices is typically modulated by a low-frequency oscillator (LFO), which is implemented similarly to a flanger, except with longer delays and without feedback. In the case of the synthesizer, the effect can be achieved by using multiple, slightly detuned oscillators for each note, or by passing all the notes played through a separate electronic chorus circuit.

Stereo chorus effect processors produce the same effect, but it is varied between the left and right channels by offsetting the delay or phase of the LFO. The effect is thereby enhanced because sounds are produced from multiple locations in the stereo field. Used on instruments like "clean" (undistorted) electric guitar and keyboards, it can yield very dreamy or ambient sounds. Commercial chorus effect devices often include controls that enable them to also produce delay, reverberation, or other related effects that use similar hardware, rather than exclusively as chorus effects.

In spite of the name, most electronic chorus effects do not accurately emulate the acoustic ensemble effect. Instead, they create a constantly moving electronic shimmer. Some pitch shift pedals create a slightly detuned unison effect which is more similar to the acoustic chorus sound.

=== Notable electronic chorus devices ===
Although the electronic chorus effect can be obtained by the multiple ways mentioned above, some devices have acquired a high status among musicians, especially in the "effect pedal" form.

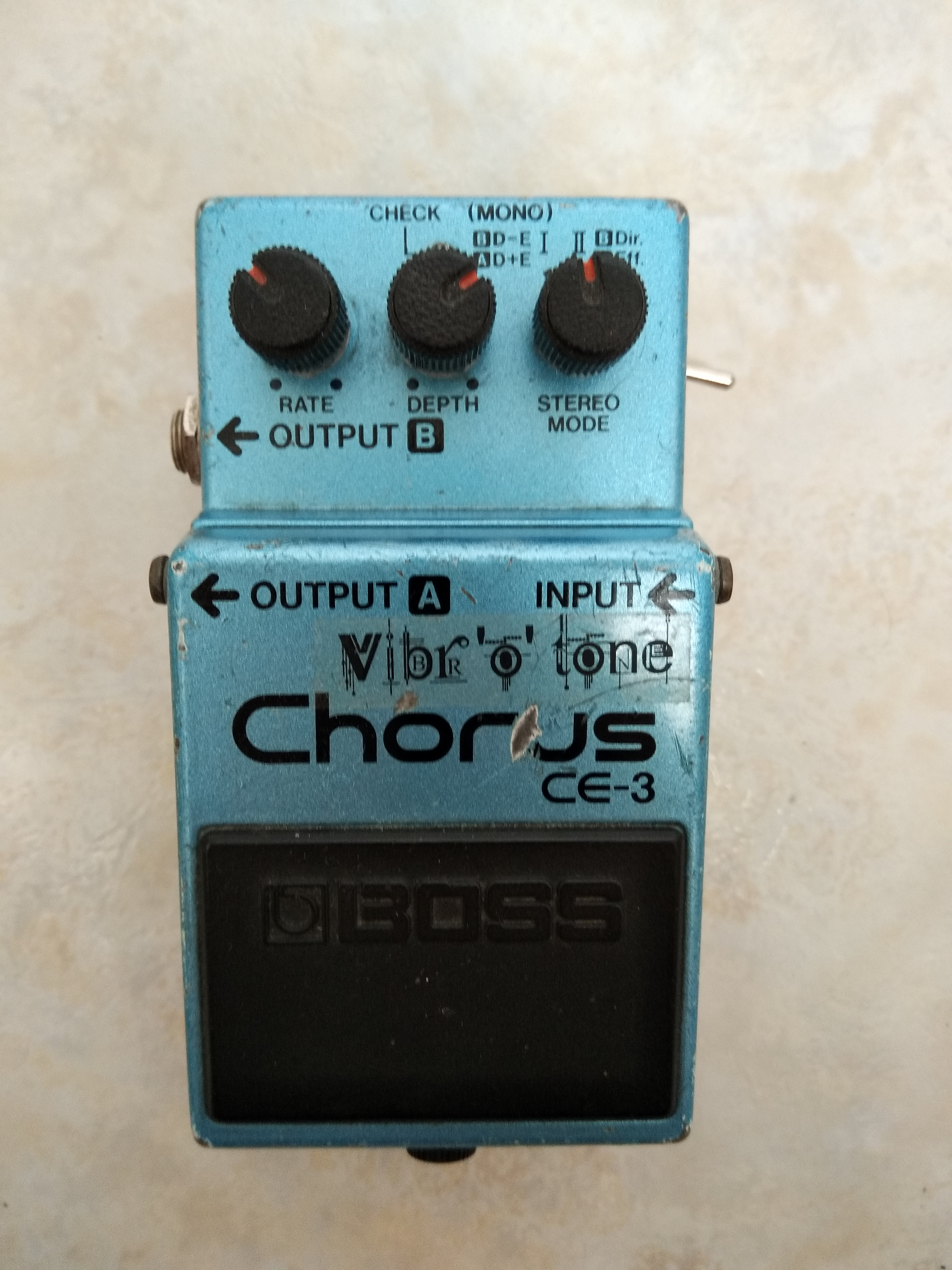
A modded BOSS CE-3 chorus pedal from 1984.

- Boss CE-1 (1976) – One of the first chorus effect pedals commercially available, based on the same circuit from the Roland Jazz Chorus amplifier. It was originally conceived for keyboard and synthesizer players, but guitarists have utilized it as well, like John Frusciante (Red Hot Chili Peppers).
- Boss CE-2 (1978) – A smaller pedal (in the standard Boss enclosure) than the CE-1, and a popular choice for guitarists during the 1980s.
- Electro-Harmonix Small Clone (1979) – Used by Kurt Cobain of Nirvana.
- Ibanez CS9 (1982) – A popular stereo analog chorus pedal that found equal popularity with the Boss CE-2 in the 1980's. Sold under the Maxon brand as well.
- Boss CE-3 (1982) – An improved version of the CE-2 with corrected input impedance and higher headroom (together creating a less mid-accentuated / less compressed sound), as well as adding a stereo effect output.
- Boss DC-2 Dimension C (1985) – A more complex chorus concept without the wobbling pitch sound that the other units named produce.

== Examples ==
Some examples of the use of "obviously chorused guitar tracks" include Red Hot Chili Peppers' "Soul to Squeeze" (0:00), Fripp & Eno's "Evensong" (0:37), Guns N’ Roses “ Paradise City” (0:00), Nirvana's "Come As You Are" (0:00, clearest at 0:48), Mike Stern's "Swunk" (0:00), and Satellite Party's "Mr. Sunshine" (0:19, right channel). The chorus effect was also a prominent hallmark of guitarist Andy Summers of the Police ("Don't Stand So Close to Me", "Walking on the Moon", "Every Breath You Take").

== See also ==
- Bass chorus
- Flanging
- Leslie speaker
- List of music software
- Overdubbing
- Phasing
- Resonance
- Shepard tone
- Wave interference
