= 琵琶 =

琵琶 is an East Asian string instrument.

琵琶 may refer to:

- Bipa, a Korean pear-shaped lute
- Biwa, a Japanese short-necked fretted lute
- Pipa, a Chinese plucked string instrument
- Tỳ bà or đàn tỳ bà (檀琵琶), a Vietnamese traditional plucked string instrument
