= Guitarrón =

Guitarrón or guitarron is a common name for a number of stringed instruments found in Latin America and may refer to:

- Guitarrón argentino, a six-stringed musical instrument from Argentina
- Guitarrón chileno, a 25-stringed, plucked instrument from Chile
- Guitarrón mexicano, a six-stringed, plucked instrument from Mexico
