= Kitara =

Kitara can refer to:

- Kitara, the nickname for the Sapporo Concert Hall.
- Empire of Kitara, a legendary East African empire founded by the Tembuzi dynasty and later ruled by the Chwezi dynasty.
- Kingdom of Bunyoro-Kitara, an East African kingdom founded by the Biito dynasty.
- Kithara (musical instrument), ancient Greek lyre.
- Kithara (Harry Partch), a third-bridge zither created by Harry Partch.
- Misa Kitara, a guitar-shaped touchpad MIDI controller and musical instrument.
- Runyakitara, a standardized language in Uganda.
- Kitara FC, a football club in Bunyoro, Uganda.
