= Baj =

Baj or BAJ may refer to:

== People ==
- Baj Singh (died 1716), Sikh general
- Enrico Baj (1924–2003), Italian artist and art writer
- Stanisław Baj (born 1953), Polish painter
- Tommaso Baj (c. 1650–1714), Italian conductor, composer and tenor

== BAJ ==
- Bachelor of Arts, Journalism
- Bridge Asia Japan, a non-governmental organisation
- Bank Aljazira, a Saudi Arabian financial group
- Belarusian Association of Journalists, a Belarusian non-governmental organisation
- Berliner Astronomisches Jahrbuch, an astronomical ephemeris almanac

== Other uses ==
- Baj, Hungary, a village
- Baj Ganjo, a character created by Bulgarian author Aleko Konstantinov
- baj, ISO 639-3 code for the Barakai language, spoken on the Aru Islands of Indonesia

== See also ==
- Bajs (disambiguation)
