= Chagane =

Azerbaijani bowed musical instrument

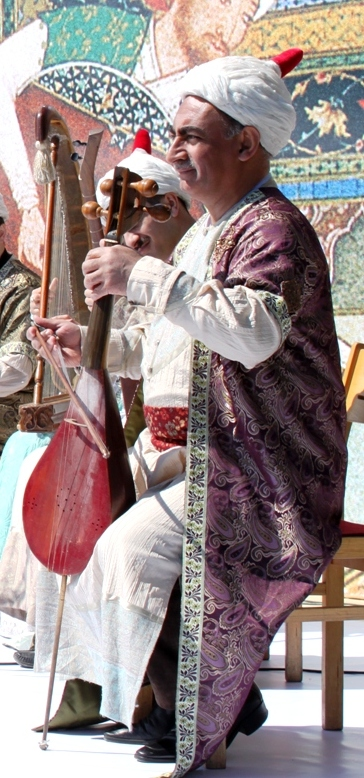
- Chagane player in Azerbaijan during Nowruz

String instrument
- Classification: Bowed Strings

Related instruments
- Igil; Morin khuur; Ghaychak; Rebab; Byzantine lyra; Sorahi; Kemenche; Gudok; Gusle

The Chagane (Azerbaijani: cağan, çəqanə) is an Azerbaijani four-stringed bowed musical instrument. Its range is F#2 to F#5.

While played, instrument is held in a vertical position. Sound is produced with a bow in the right hand. The total length of the instrument is 820 mm, the body length is 420 mm, the width is 220 mm, and the height is 140 mm.

Chagane was painted by Grigory Gagarin in his painting "Shemakha dancers" among other music instruments.
