= Bajs =

Bajs or BAJS may refer to:

- Damir Bajs (born 1964), Croatian politician
- British Association for Jewish Studies, a UK organisation promoting the scholarly study of Jewish culture
- British Association for Japanese Studies, a UK organisation promoting Japanese studies
- Gunjac, a Croatian violincello like instrument with two strings
