= Ahuva Ozeri =

Israeli singer (1948–2016)

Ahuva Ozeri אהובה עוזרי
- Born: 3 March 1948; Tel Aviv, Israel
- Died: 13 December 2016 (aged 68) Ramat Gan, Israel
- Genres: World; Mizrahi
- Occupations: Singer; songwriter; composer
- Instruments: Vocals; bulbul tarang
- Years active: 1973–2016

Ahuva Ozeri (Hebrew: אהובה עוזרי; 3 March 1948 – 13 December 2016) was an Israeli singer, songwriter and composer. She released 20 albums over her four-decade career. According to The Times of Israel, she was "a pioneer of Israeli music".

== Early life ==
Ahuva Ozeri was born and grew up in Tel Aviv's Yemenite Quarter to a Jewish family. Her father died when she was four years old; she had seven siblings.

== Career ==
Ozeri started her career as a singer in Israel in the 1960s. Additionally, she was a songwriter and composer. She played the Bulbul tarang, an Indian musical instrument she learned from the drummer of Ravi Shankar. She released her first album, Where is the Soldier?, in 1975. The songs were about the Yom Kippur War. She went on to release 19 more albums in the next four decades. Despite losing her vocal chords to cancer, which greatly affected her voice, she continued to release new music, including six new albums. She released the 2004 hit song Sticker Song with Hadag Nahash. Five years later, in 2013, she released her last album, Maalei Demama (Out of Silence) in 2013, in which she wrote and composed songs interpreted by such artists as Berry Sakharof, Ehud Banai, and Chava Alberstein.

Ozeri was the recipient of an award from ACUM in 2008 in recognition of her unique contribution to Israeli music. She was "a founding mother of Mizrahi music" according to Arutz Sheva and "a pioneer of Israeli music" according to The Times of Israel. Uri Barbash, an Israeli filmmaker, did a documentary about her.

== Personal life and death ==
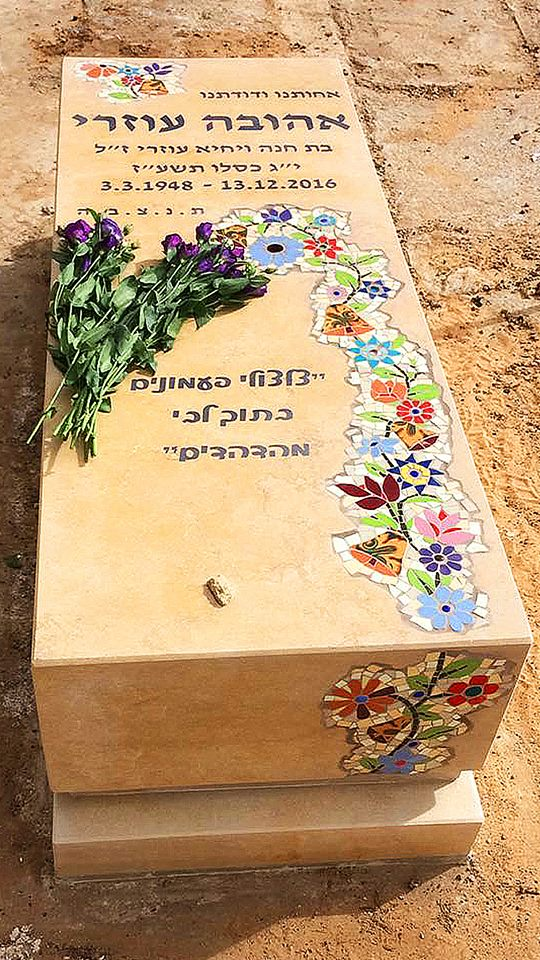
Ahuva Ozeri's grave

Ozeri was first diagnosed with laryngeal cancer in 2000, when she had surgery. Though she was still able to talk and continued to record music with her own voice, the removal of her vocal cords made it very hoarse and weak. In 2002, she underwent another surgery to remove a tumour. She died of cancer on December 13, 2016, at the Sheba Medical Center in Ramat Gan, Israel, aged 68.

Upon her death, Prime Minister Benjamin Netanyahu called her "a pillar of Mediterranean music in Israel." Additionally, Miri Regev, Israel's Culture and Sports Minister, tweeted, "the crown of a renewed Israeli culture fell today. Ahuva (meaning "beloved" in Hebrew), rest in peace. I assure you, your voice will not be silenced forever." Yuli Edelstein, the Speaker of the Knesset, called her "a unique figure who blended East and West in an amazing way in her melodies and her lyrics", adding "Her dedication to her work despite the challenges is an inspiration. May her memory be for a blessing.”
