= Ajayu =

String instrument
- Classification: String instrument
- Hornbostel–Sachs classification: (Composite chordophone)
- Developed: Chile

Related instruments
- Laúd, Bandurria, Bandolin, Bandola, Guitarron chileno.

The Ajayu is a stringed instrument from Chile.

It has 12 strings in 5 courses. It is tuned A A, E E, A A, C# C# C#, F# F# F# or C C, G G, C C, E E E, A A A. The strings are made of steel.

The soundboard is split laterally and longitudinally with a pair of strips of darker wood, probably looking for a particular sound, rather than an ornament to use. The appearance resembles a bandolin from Ecuador, the Peruvian Marimacho Bandurria and especially the Laúd.
