= Oungum =

North Korean stringed musical instrument

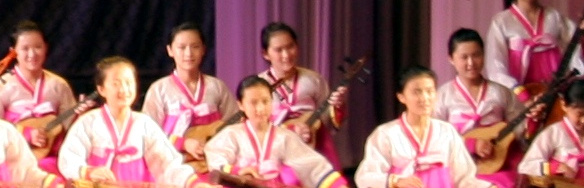
- Oungum players at the Children's Palace, Pyongyang.

String instrument
- Other names: ŏŭn-gŭm, eoeungeum
- Classification: String instrument Plucked string instrument
- Hornbostel–Sachs classification: 321.322-6 (Chordophone with permanently attached resonator and neck, sounded by a plectrum)
- Developed: 1960's

Related instruments
- Bipa

The eoeungeum (RR) or ŏŭn-gŭm (MR) (Korean: 어은금) is a stringed musical instrument invented and played in North Korea. It is between the size of a mandolin and a mandola, and commonly has four single strings. It is a development in the 1960's from the traditional Korean instrument called hyangbipa.
