= Spitzharfe =

18th century table-top zither

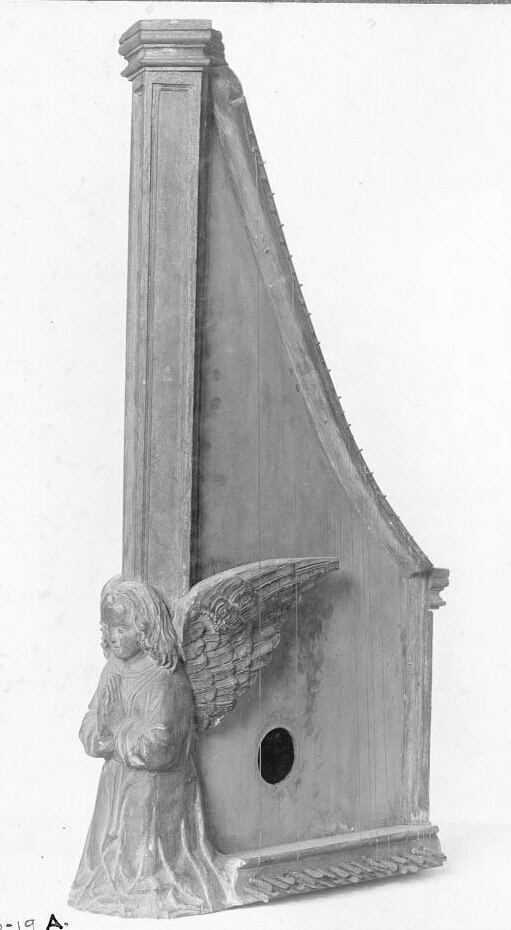
Spitzharfe (17th or 18th century, German or French)

A spitzharfe (or arpanetta) is a musical string instrument popular in Italy and Germany in the seventeenth and eighteenth centuries. Up to 90 centimetres tall, it is designed to be placed on a table, and consists of two sets of strings - steel strings to produce the melody and brass strings for the accompaniment. It is played by plucking with fingers, in a manner similar to the harp.
