= Imzad =

Tuareg fiddle-type traditional instrument

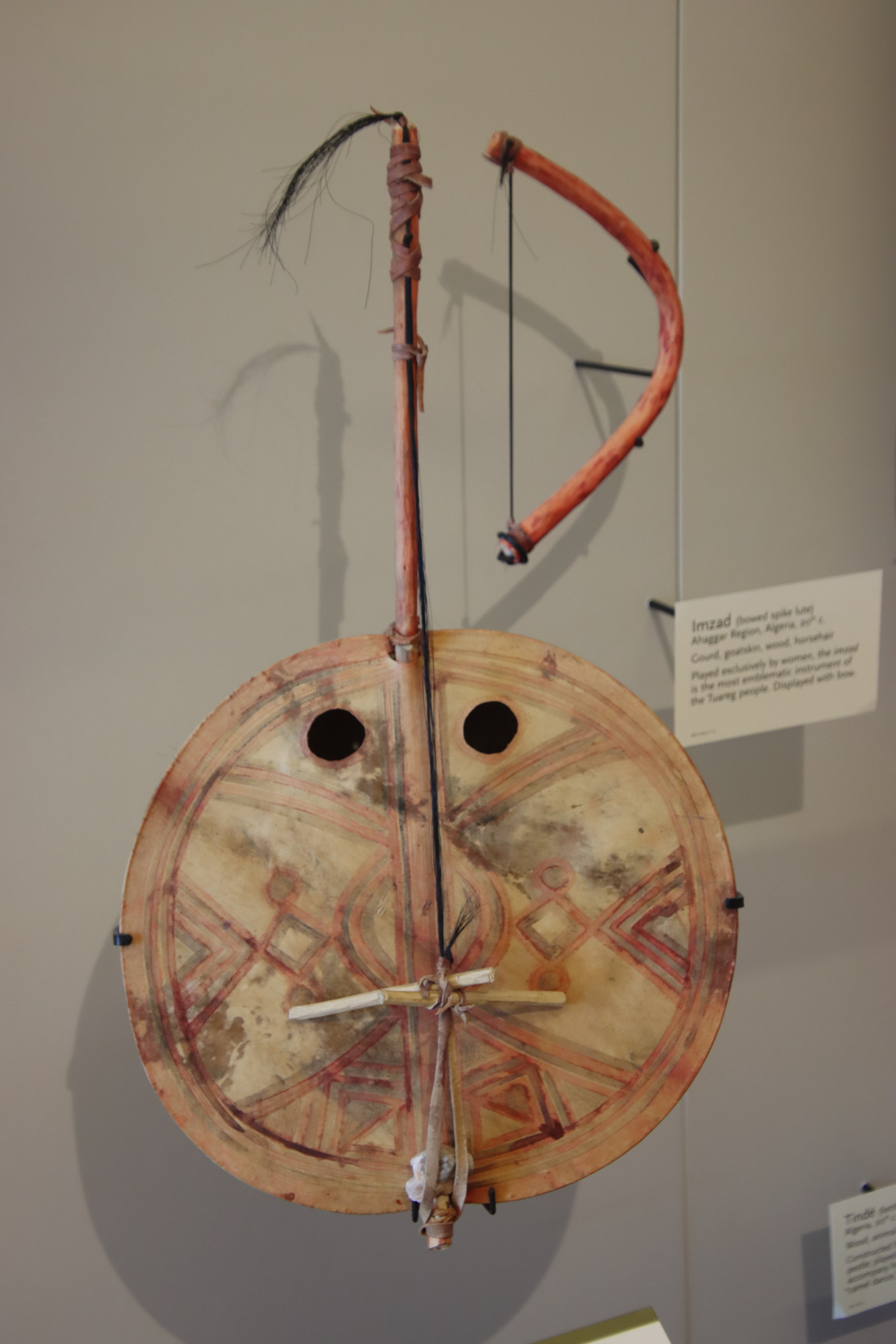
Imzad bowed lute. 20th century, Tuareg people, Ahaggar Region, Algeria

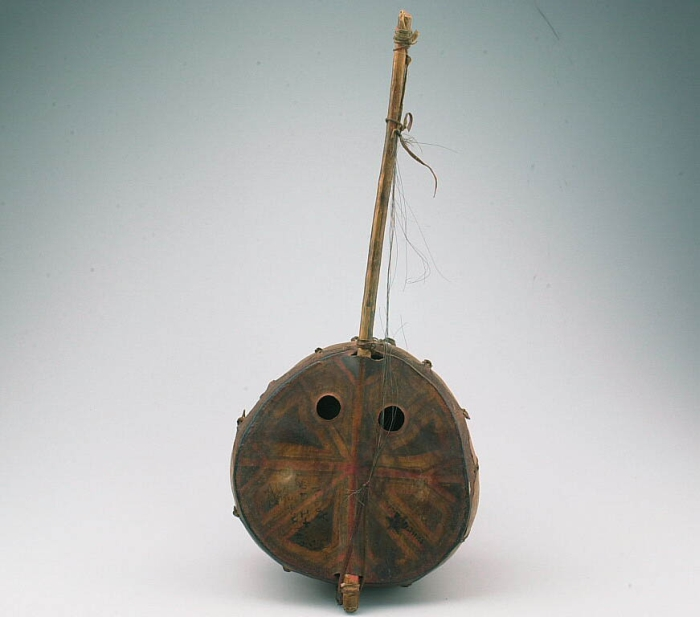
An imzad

The imzad (Arabic: إمزاد; alternately amzad) is a type of bowed "single-string fiddle" used by the Tuareg people in Africa.

Its body is made out of a gourd which is covered by animal skin, creating a soundboard. The strings are made from horse hair and are connected near the neck, and runs over a two-part bridge. The bridge is made of two pieced of wood, joined into a cross. The round bow is also equipped with horse hair.

Traditionally, the instrument was played to accompany men's songs. The imzad is only played by the women for example to accompany songs, often during an evening ceremony called takket.
