= T'yngryng =

The t'yngryng (or tyngryn, tïgrïk) is a musical instrument of the Nivkh people (formerly called Gilyak) of Sakhalin Island in the Russian Far East. It is a one-string fiddle, played in the lap with a bow, with a body of birch-bark and a soundboard made of fish skin.

== See also ==
- Huchir, a spike-fiddle of the Buryat Mongols
- Dudumanku, a one-string fiddle of the Oroch people
- Ducheke, a Nanai instrument
