= Đàn tính =

Stringed musical instrument

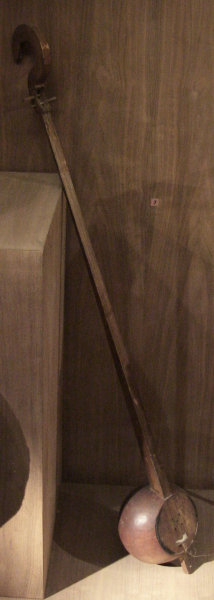
- Đàn Tính

String instrument
- Other names: Tianqin
- Classification: String instrument
- Hornbostel–Sachs classification: (Composite chordophone)

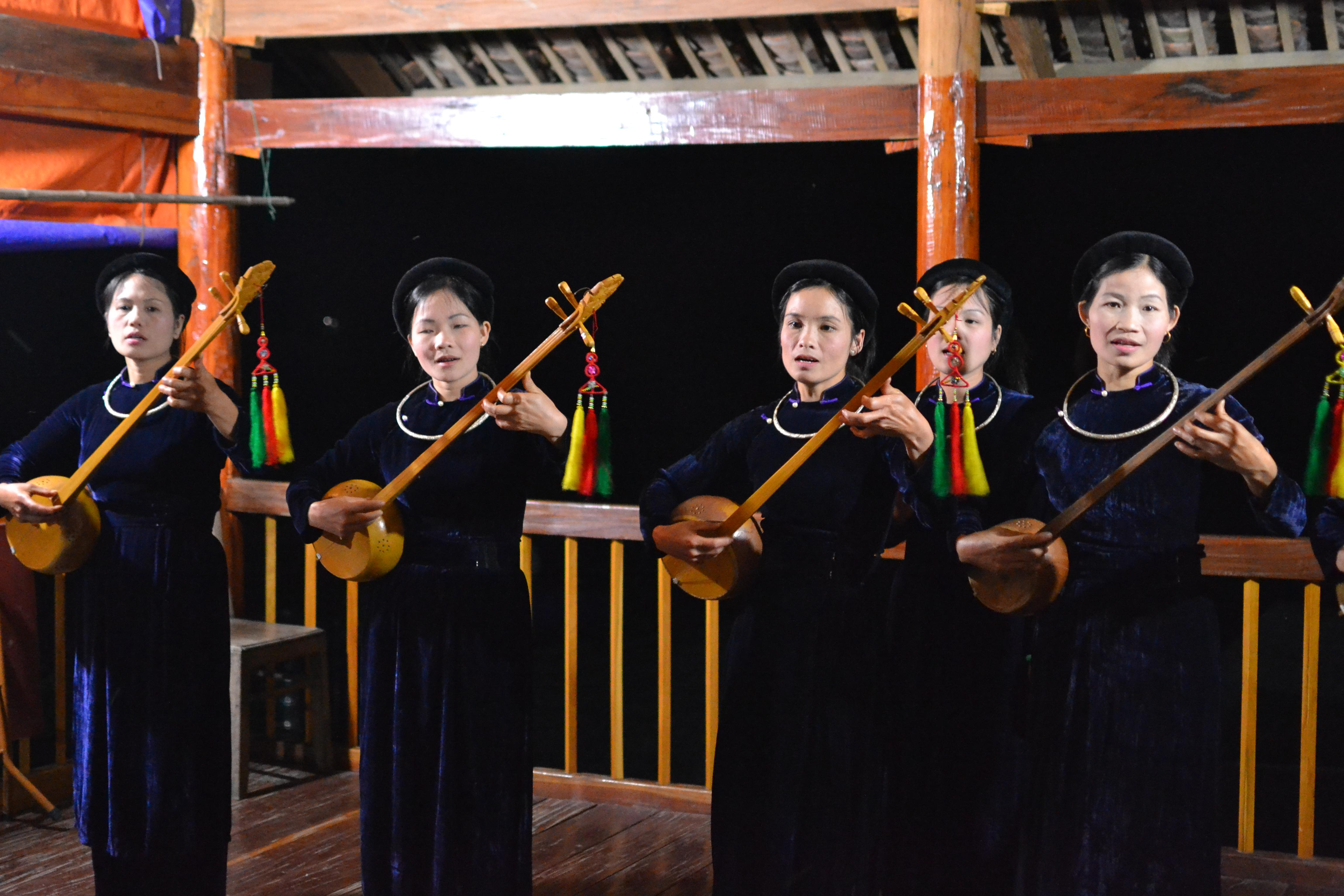
Tày women play đàn tính

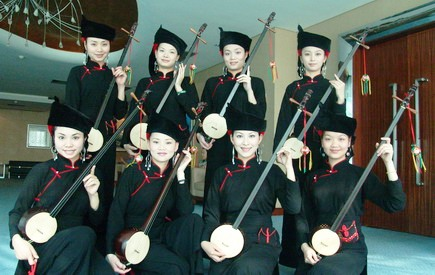
Zhuang women play tianqin

The đàn tính, or tính tẩu (gourd lute), is a stringed musical instrument from tianqin (Chinese: 天琴; pinyin: Tiān qín of Zhuang people in China), imported to Vietnam by the Tày people of Lạng Sơn Province in Vietnam. Although "tính tẩu" originated as a Tày word, both names are used in Vietnamese.

The instrument has from two to four strings in from two to four courses. The strings are made of silk, nylon or fishing wire. It is used by shamans in séances in the hope that it will be animated by spirits.

In 2007, Vietnam's Ministry of Culture, Sports and Tourism submitted a plan to promote the instrument, as well as the "Then" style of singing that it often accompanies. A seminar recommended that traditional songs be transcribed and recordings made, and that local art schools provide instruction in this type of music.

== History ==
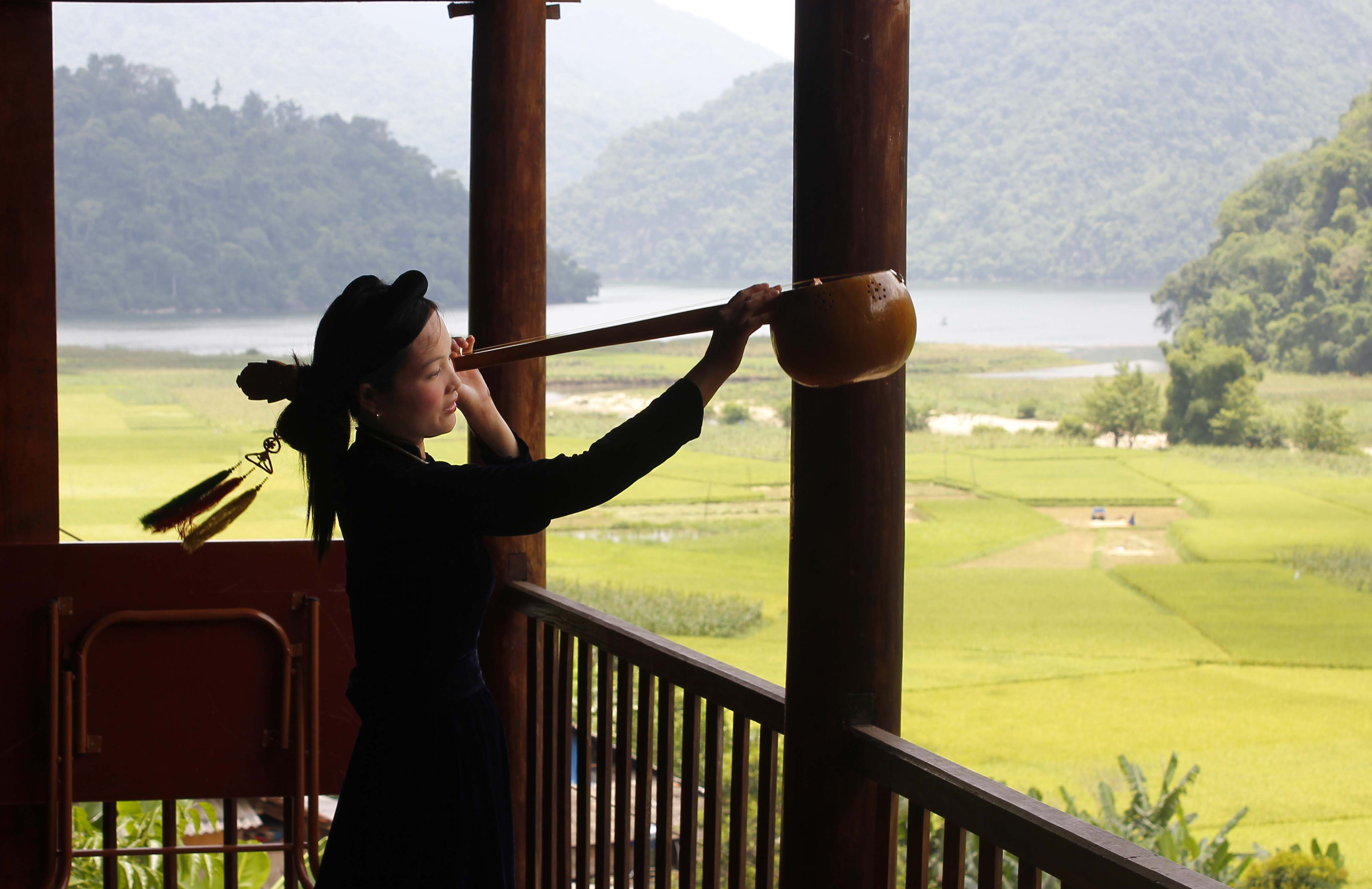
Tày people hát then in Ba Bể Lake

It spread among the Pian and Tày people of the Zhuang nationality. It was originally used by Tianpo (witches) to cure disasters and diseases.

Later, this witchcraft-like singing and dancing evolved into a mass entertainment activity, but it is still called singing, playing and dancing.

The instrument used is called Tianqin. The traditional tianqin is about 120 cm long. The long vertical stick-like neck is made of wood, carved with dragon patterns. The head of the lute is carved into the shape of a phoenix, handsome seal, sun or moon, and a wooden peg is placed on the left and right. The lute tube is made of gourd or hemp bamboo tube. It is hemispherical, 10 cm thick, with 11 rubber hemp bamboo shells or thin paulownia wood boards at the front, with a surface diameter of 11 cm, and the engraved pattern at the back end is a sound window. Bamboo piano bridge, silk strings. The various parts of the lute body can be disassembled and assembled for easy portability.

A modern tianqin, the shaft is 90 cm long and semi-cylindrical, with no decoration on the shaft. The headstock is flat-topped, the tube is made of Gastrodia elata bamboo or iron, round, 10 cm in diameter, with silk or nylon strings. Tuning c1, g or d1, g. The inner string sets the treble, and the outer string sets the bass. Range g-g3. In the long feudal society, the tianqin was regarded as a sacred thing, and only Tianpo could use it when "jumping to the sky". "Tiaotian" was originally a strange and superstitious performance performed by people.

A woman named "Tianpo", wearing a long skirt and a beaded cap, played and sang with a lyre in her hand. side dance. She claimed to be a celestial fairy who came down to earth to have fun, solve problems and bestow blessings. Tianpo's lyre is regarded as a god in the sky, and it is not allowed to move at ordinary times. When it is used, it must be incensed before it can be taken down and played.

== See also ==
- Traditional Chinese musical instruments
