= Guitarrón argentino =

Musical string instrument from Argentina

String instrument
- Classification: String instrument
- Hornbostel–Sachs classification: (Composite chordophone)

Related instruments
- Guitarrón uruguayo, Guitarrón chileno

The guitarrón argentino is a stringed musical instrument from Argentina. It has 6 strings in 6 courses and is tuned B1, E2, A2, D3, G3, B3. The strings are made of nylon.
