= Enneg =

Mexican bowed string instrument

The enneg is a bowed string instrument. It is a traditional instrument of the Seri or Konkaak tribe in northwestern Mexico. It consists of a rectangular body carved from a block of wood, a bridge and has one string. The instrument is played with a mesquite-and-horsehair bow. It is used in rites and dances, similar to the kokyu', a Japanese instrument.
