= Penorcon =

Rare, early plucked string instrument

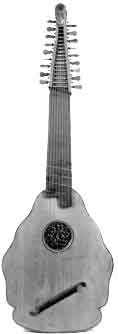
Penorcon

The penorcon is a plucked string instrument with nine courses of double strings, depicted in the treatise Syntagma Musicum (17th century) by Praetorius. The sides of the instrument are scalloped and sometimes the resonance soundboard has no holes. In relation to the bandora, its body is a little broader, and in length, it is somewhat lesser. Its neck or fingerboard is quite wide.

This instrument uses the following tuning: G′– A′ – C – D – G – c – e – a – d′.

Music written for the penorcon has not been identified.
