= Akkordolia =

Austrian folk zither

String instrument
- Classification: String instrument
- Hornbostel–Sachs classification: (Composite chordophone)

Related instruments
- Taishōgoto, Bulbul tarang, Benju

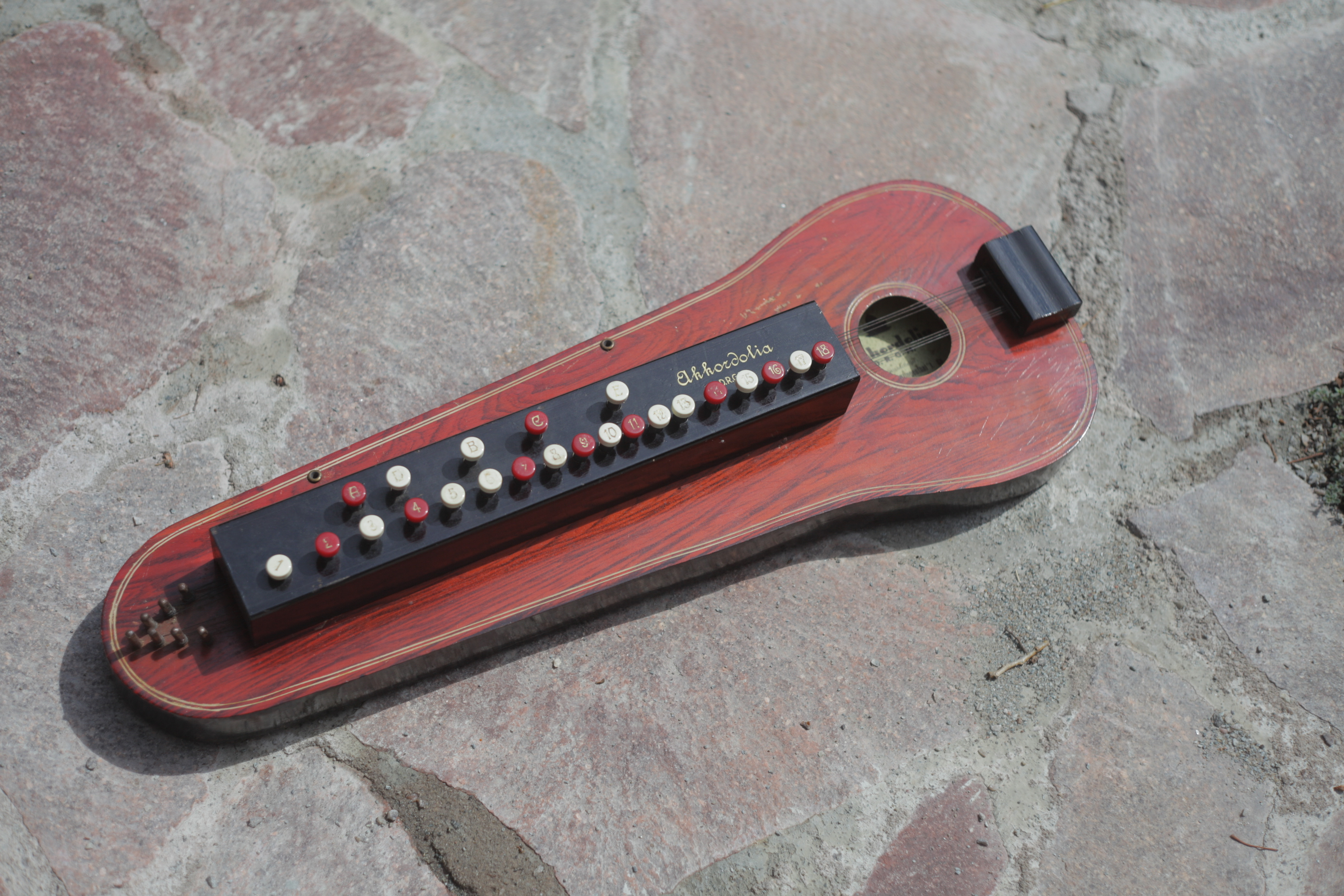
Akkordolia from top

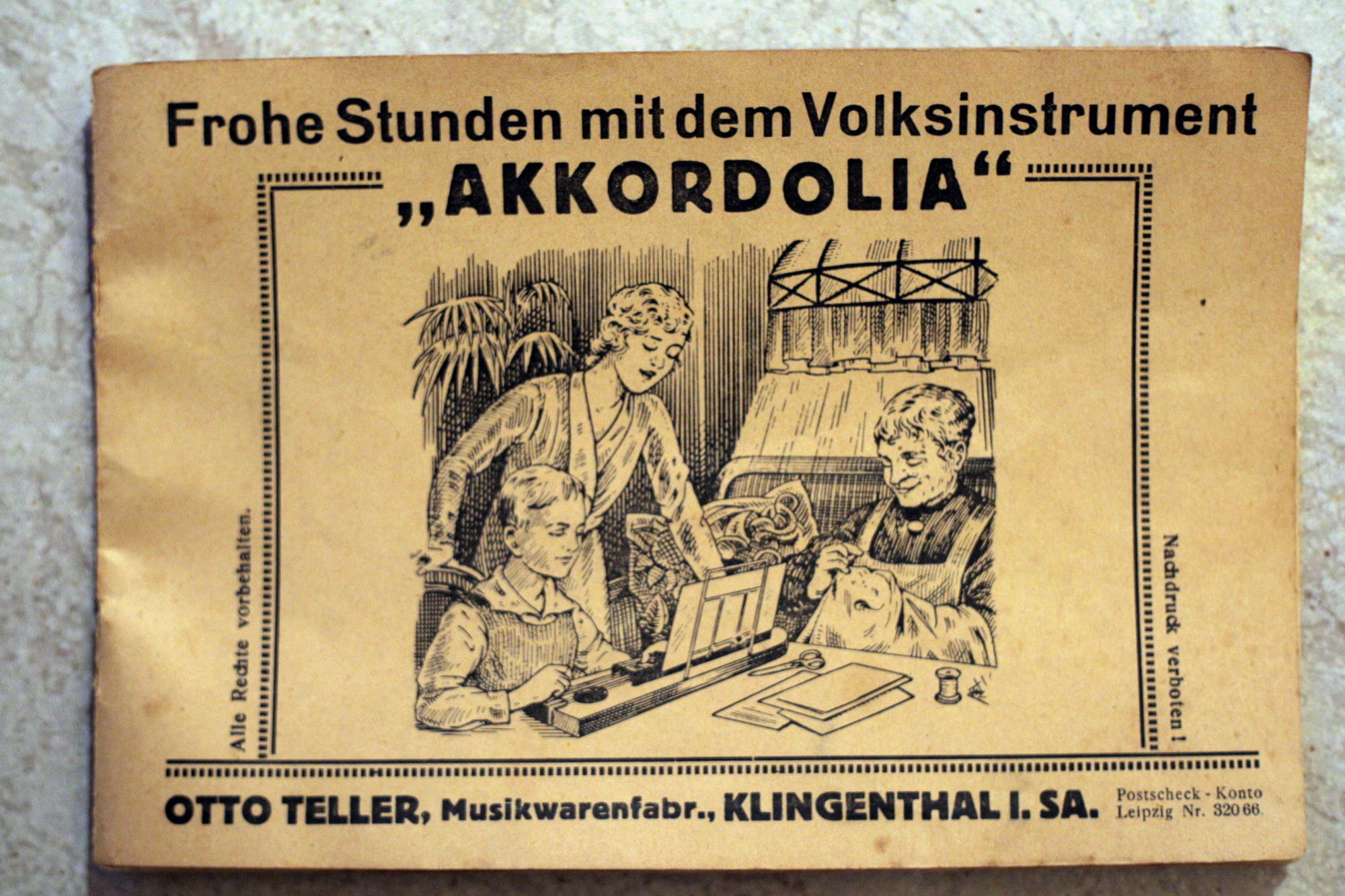
Hand book title

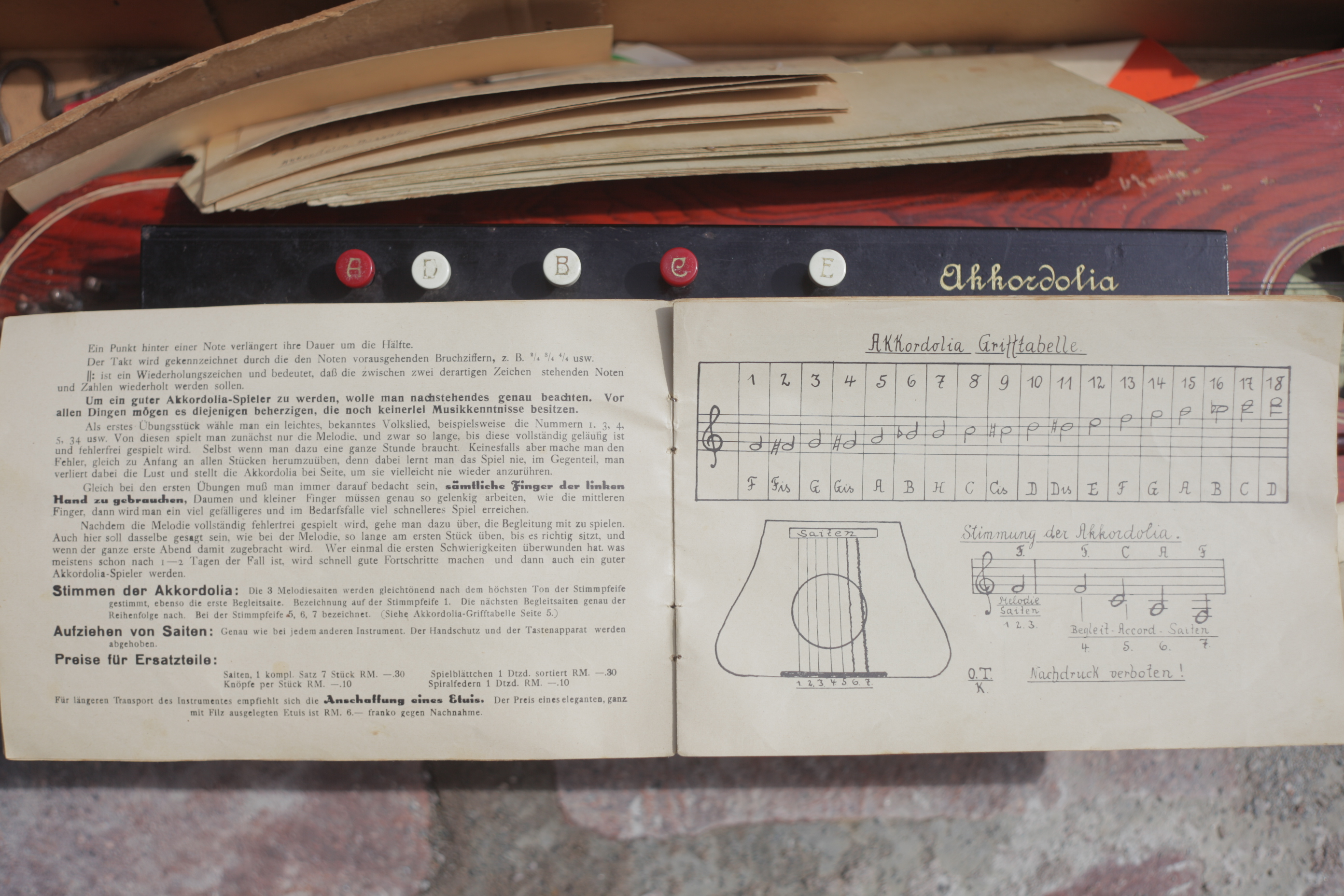
tuning instructions from hand book

The akkordolia is a zither from Germany and Austria, consisting of a long box, with the strings being pressed against the fretboard by pressing down buttons from above, similar to the Japanese taishogoto. One row of buttons changes the melody, and the other row of buttons can change the chord which backs the melody.

The instrument was invented around the start of the 20th century by Otto Teller of Klingenthal, Germany, and was produced locally there by cottage industry.
