= Bulbul tarang =

Indian string instrument

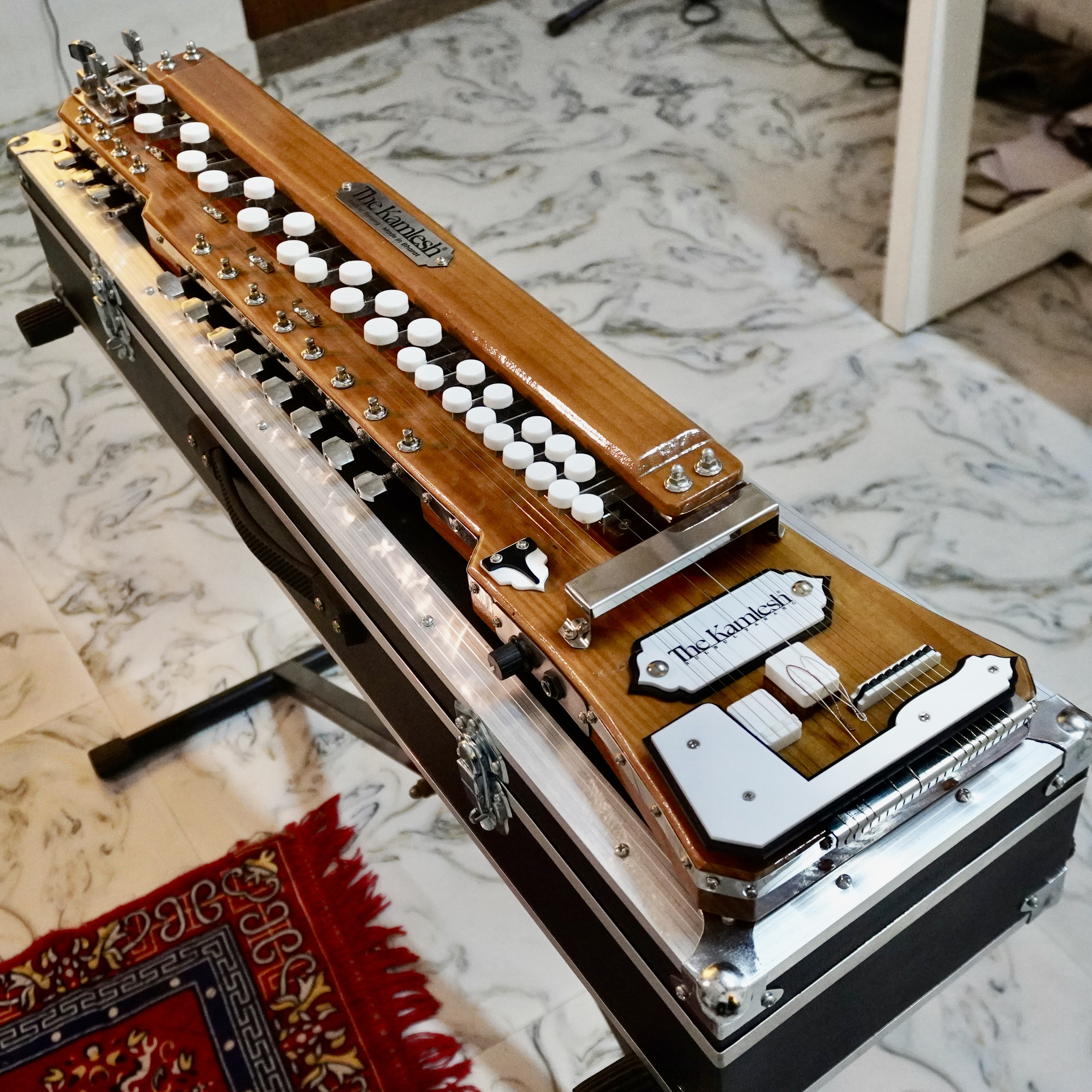
Bulbul Tarang made by THE KAMLESH

The Bulbul Tarang (बुलबुल तरंग) literally "waves of nightingales", alternately Indian Banjo) is a string instrument from India, that evolved from the Japanese taishōgoto, which likely arrived in South Asia in the 1930s.

The Bulbul Tarang has evolved through the time. Currently the Bulbul Tarang has a total of 14 strings which is divided in 3 parts: 2 Main(Melody & Bass) strings, 4 Jhala Strings, and 8 Swarmandal Strings. The strings run over a fretboard which is known as Surpatti in Hindi, while above are keys resembling typewriter keys, which when depressed fret or shorten the strings to raise their pitch.

Taishogoto, probably first imported into India in the 1930s, which has caught on both in India and Pakistan and become a legitimate instrument, now called Bulbul Tarang (the nightingale's cascading voice) or Indian Banjo.

== Tuning ==
The melody strings are commonly tuned to the same note, or in octaves, while the drone strings are tuned to the 1st and 5th of the melody strings. Tuned in this manner, the instrument is uni-tonic, or not used to modulate to different keys because the fine melismatic music of India is more concerned with expressing subtle, microtonal pitch increments in a music-theoretic system radically different from Western, predominantly harmonic music; so that modulation to different keys is not considered so important. The melody strings may be tuned to different pitches if desired, however, rendering it multi-tonic, but more difficult to play. The bulbul tarang is most commonly played as accompaniment to singing. Similar to the Autoharp, a chord can be selected when a key is depressed, and the strings are often bowed or strummed with a pick.

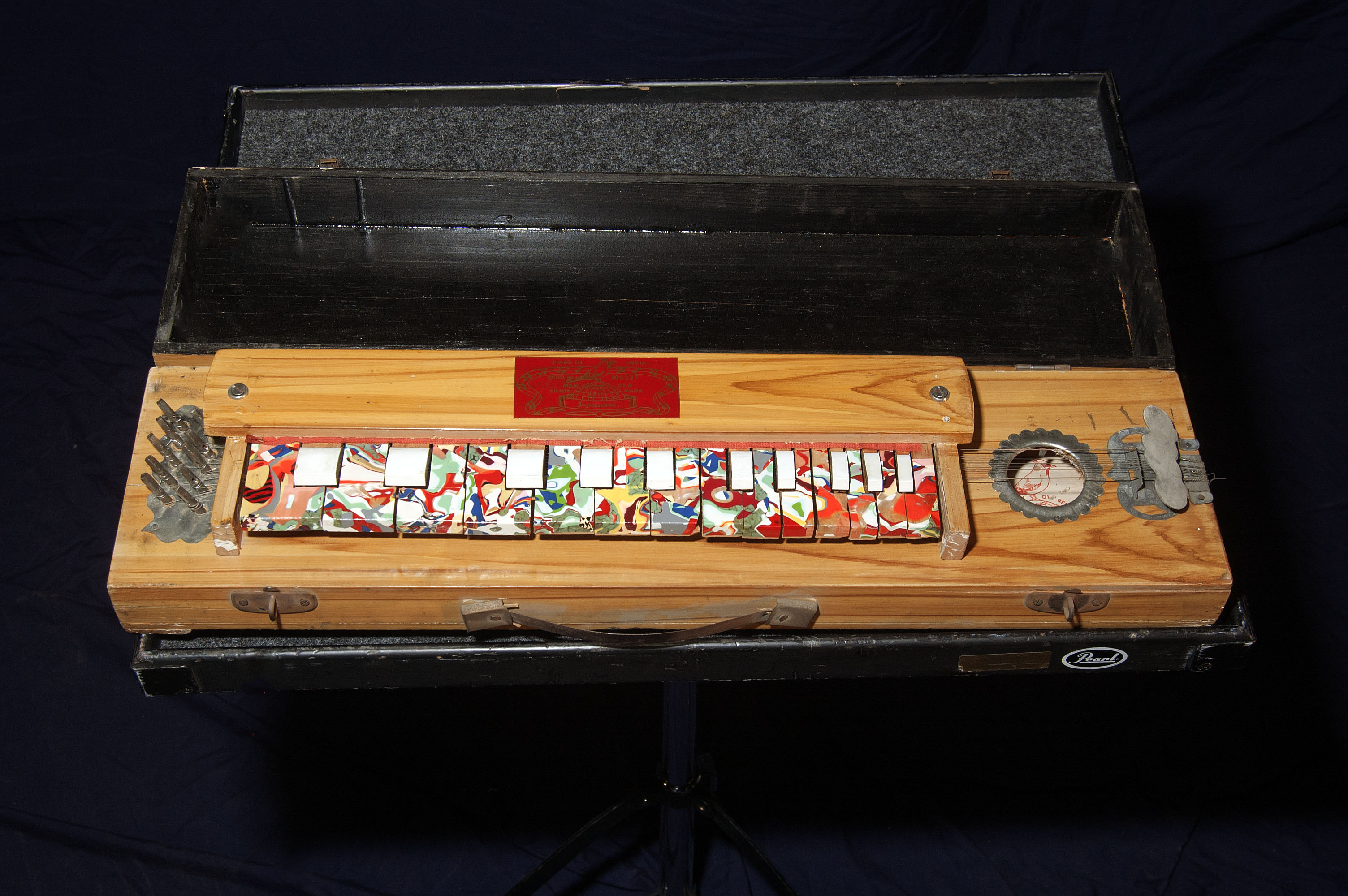
Bulbul Tarang (from Emil Richards Collection)

== Related instruments ==
The Indian version is sometimes known as the "Indian banjo" or "Japan banjo", due to its descent from the taishokoto; similar instruments in Germany and Austria are known as akkordolia, and in Pakistan as benju. In the Maldives it is known as a kottafoshi, and as medolin (pronounced "mendolin" after the mandolin) in the Fijian Indian diaspora.

A more complicated and electrified version is known as the shahi baaja.

== Notable players ==
- Hala Strana
- Air, a jazz group
- Ahuva Ozeri From Tel-Aviv, Israel
