= Yakatat =

Alaskan bowed string instrument

The yakatat or yakutat is a bowed string instrument native to Alaska, described by ethnomusicologist Daniel Brinton.
