= Quinton (musical instrument) =

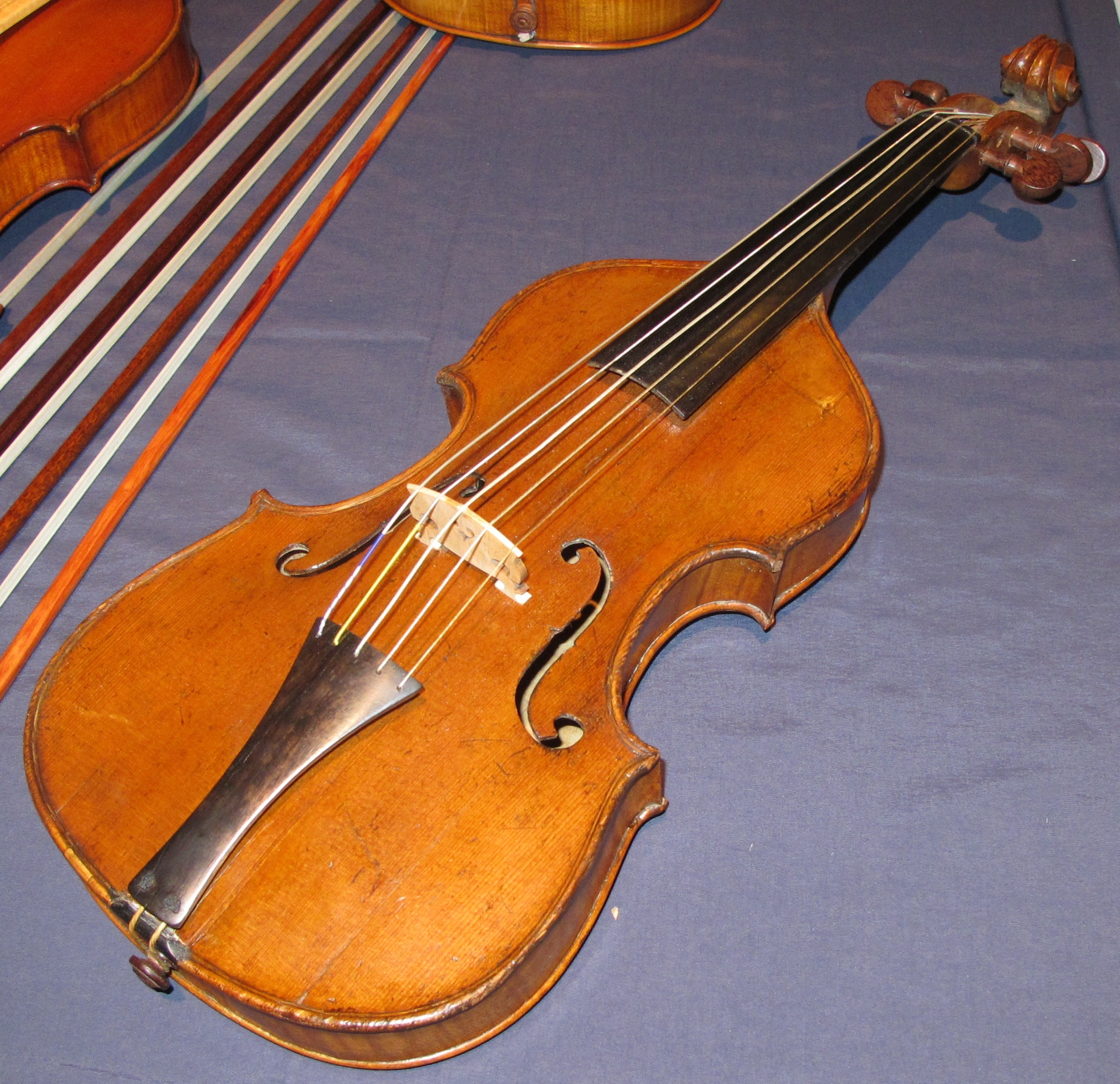
- Quinton made in Mirecourt, 18th century

The quinton is a bowed musical instrument, in use mostly in France in the 18th century (between 1730 and 1789). It takes its name from the fact that, in ensembles, it played the quinta vox or quintus. Another derivation of the name may be from the number of strings and for consonance with violon. By the same name it is sometimes denoted the pardessus de viole, an originally six-stringed instrument of the family of the viols, since the pardessus lost one string and adopted the same tuning of the quinton. However, while the pardessus is viol-shaped, the quinton is violin-shaped.

== Characteristics ==
The quinton was an hybrid between the violin (structure of the body, f-shaped holes), and the viol (sloped shoulders, wider fingerboard with seven adjustable frets). The tuning of the five strings was intermediate between violin and viol (in Helmholtz pitch notation) : c, g, d', a', e". The pegbox ended either in a scroll, like violins, or in a carved head, like viols. It was played on the lap, with underhand bow grip, as the pardessus.

== History ==
The quinton was invented around 1730, as reaction of French luthiers to the increasing popularity of the Italian violin. Like the violino piccolo, it was intended to play higher voices, with a better sound in the upper register while full-bodied in the lower one. It became fashionable in France, particularly among ladies, and regularly present in concerts. Its highest popularity was around 1750. Many celebrated French luthiers, among them Jacques Boquay, Claude Boivin, Augustin Chappuy, Jean Colin, François Gaviniès, Paul-François Grosset, Louis Guersan, François Le Jeune, Jean-Baptiste Salomon, built quintons. The prominent head-carver La Fille dedicated himself to quintons. In such a way, the quintons reached high market quotations. Since 1760, as viols in general, the quinton lost importance and became more and more similar to the violin (losing the top string, adopting violin's tuning and bow grip), until, at the time of the French Revolution, it disappeared. Modern copies are built for specialists of baroque music and historically informed performance.

Sonatas for quinton have been written by Jacques Aubert and published in his opus 4. In general, all music written for the five-stringed pardessus can be played on the quinton.
