= Socavon =

Panamanian string instrument

String instrument
- Other names: Bocona
- Classification: String instrument
- Hornbostel–Sachs classification: (Composite chordophone)

Related instruments
- Mejoranera

The socavon is a stringed instrument from Panama. It has 4 nylon strings in 4 courses. It is tuned G3, D4, A4, B3.
