= Shahi baaja =

The shahi baaja ("royal instrument") is an electrified and slightly modified version of the Indian bulbul tarang, a type of Indian zither to which have been added typewriter keys which depress two of the strings to change their pitch. The modifications also include the addition of 10 additional unfretted strings which serve as an attached swarmandal (drone harp).

The instrument is currently used in everything from semi-classical and popular Indian music to ambient techno, and psychedelic rock. A few musicians are now trying to adapt this instrument to play Indian Classical Music.

== Construction ==
The instrument is about 37 inches (94 cm) long and the current official configuration includes a double pick up, tone and volume controls, 30-typewriter type keys, and a solid wood body.

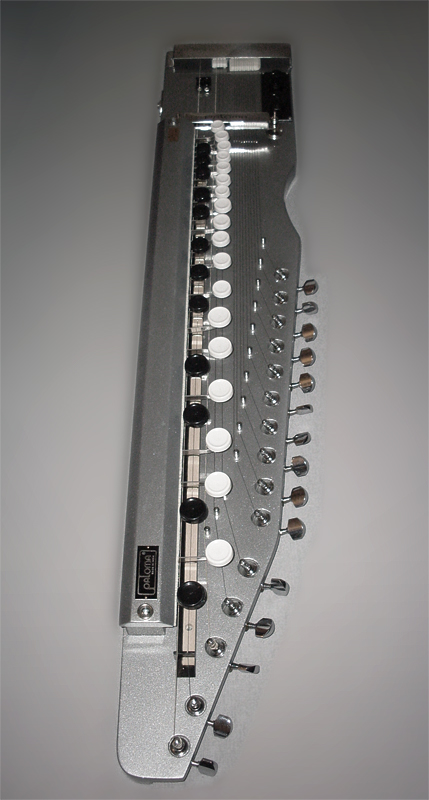
Wikimedia Commons

== Playing ==
The metal strings are plucked or strummed with picks while depressing the keys to change the notes. Some of the strings, which provide melody, are acted on by the keys, while the drone and sympathetic strings are not fretted. The instrument has two main strings, three sympathetic resonating strings and a 10-string electric drone harp.

== Contemporary use ==
The instrument has been used in indie and fusion music, with at least 40 major bands using this for lead or for vocal accompaniment, such as Twigs, Beck, and Rapoon. Michael Flower of Vibracathedral Orchestra has been playing this instrument in a free-improv duo with Chris Corsano since 2006. Several Music Directors in India, across regions and languages, have used it for film music. It is currently also popular in the stages of North India for Bhajans, Sufi Music and Ghazals.

== DocuFilm on this instrument ==
- A 1 hour documentary film in the context of India about this instrument
