= Ahenk =

Turkish musical instrument from 1929

String instrument
- Classification: String instrument
- Hornbostel–Sachs classification: (Composite chordophone)
- Developed: Turkey

Related instruments
- Cumbus; Komuz; Oud Tanbur

The ahenk is a fretless stringed instrument from Turkey, invented by Süleyman Suat Sezgin in 1929. It was designed to be played like the oud. The instrument is similar to a banjo; like the banjo it uses has a reflector bowl as a resonator. On the ahenk, the bowl is made of wood. The front resembles a banjo, with a bridge between the strings and a skin head, similar to that used on a kanun. The skin head does not cover the whole front of the instrument, instead the instrument has a wooden front with a hole for the skin, and two or more sound holes. It is similar to the Cumbus by having an adjustable neck, adjusted by turning a wing-nut.

Unlike the Cumbus, another Turkish banjo invented in the early 20th century, the instrument has nearly disappeared. There is a renewed interest in the instrument, which is being built in Istanbul and in Eskişehir (where it was invented).
