= Dudumanku =

The dudumanku is a one-string fiddle of the Oroch people of the Russian Far East.

== See also ==
- T'yngryng, a Nivkh one-string fiddle
