= Taishōgoto =

Japanese musical instrument

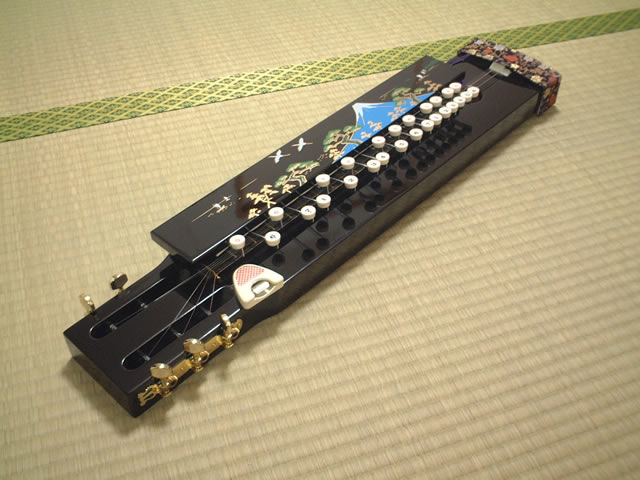
The Taishōgoto, also known as the Nagoya harp

The taishōgoto (大正琴), or Nagoya harp or peacock harp is a Japanese stringed musical instrument. The name derives from the Taishō period (1912–1926) when the instrument first appeared. It is essentially a Keyboard Psalmodikon with multiple strings.

There are 4 types available: soprano has 5 or 6 strings, alto has 4 or 5 strings, tenor and bass have 1 or 2 strings.

It is a duophonic instrument, with melody strings, each one typically being tuned to G in different octaves, which are playable using the keyboard and plucking, and an additional drone string, which is typically tuned to D and the pitch of which can't be altered while playing.

== History ==
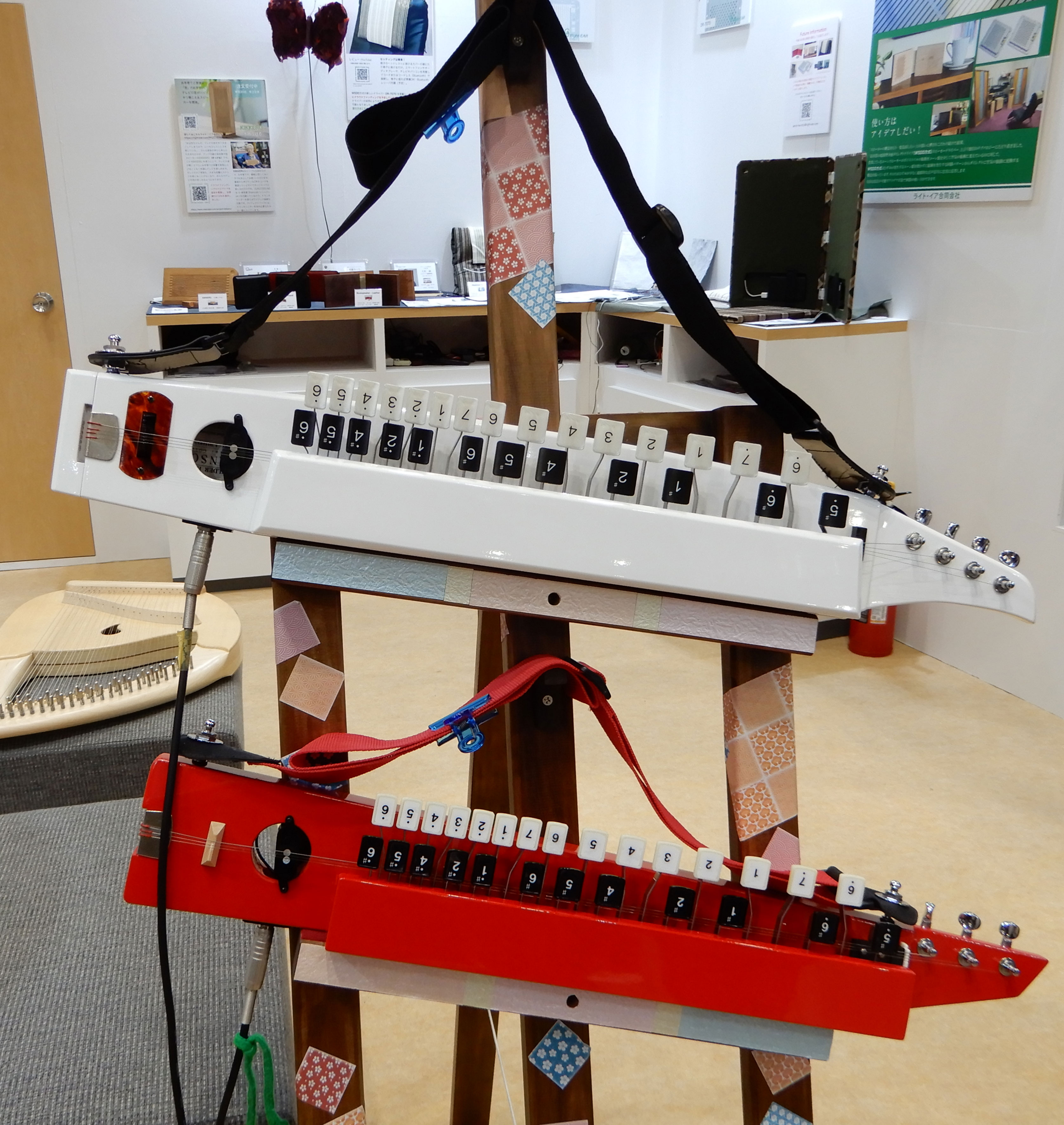
A shoulder strapped model.

The Taishōgoto was developed in 1912 by the musician Gorō Morita in Nagoya. He came up with the idea of combining the mechanics of a typewriter with an instrument.

The taishōgoto bears a close resemblance to the bulbul tarang from India, benju from Pakistan, the akkordolia from Germany, and Mandolin from Bali, Indonesia; all sharing the same principle of using keys to press down on strings to change their pitch. It also bears some resemblance to the Swedish nyckelharpa for the same reason, although the action and the method of playing the strings is very different. The instrument was used by Krautrock band Neu! on its first album in 1972, as well as by Harmonia.
