= Saw bang =

The Saw bang (Thai: ซอบั้ง) is a bowed musical instrument. It differs from a related Saw by using only bamboo for its sound box and skull fiddle (กะโหลกซอ). The bamboo is called " Mị̂ ku (ไม้กุ) ". It is sun-dried and then the bark is taken off. Holes are made and strings are stretched with the knob which are made from two pieces of wood wedge.

The other side of the cylinder has a piece of small wood called " H̄ỳxng (หย่อง)" that raises two cord lines made from bicycle brake cables. The Saw bang has two strings. The first one is called " S̄āy lị̀ s̄eīyng (สายไล่เสียง) "or Audio line out, it’s acted as the main cord and the other string called" S̄āy kl̀xm s̄eīyng (สายกล่องเสียง) " which produces higher pitch.

Each string makes a sound in conjunction with "Khæn (แคน)" and "Pī̀ (ปี่)". Saw bang has a characteristic soft tone.

In Vietnam, the similar instrument is xi xa lo or xò lò of Tai Dón people, Nghe An province.
