= Bipa =

Korean plucked lute

Dang-bipa and hyang-bipa

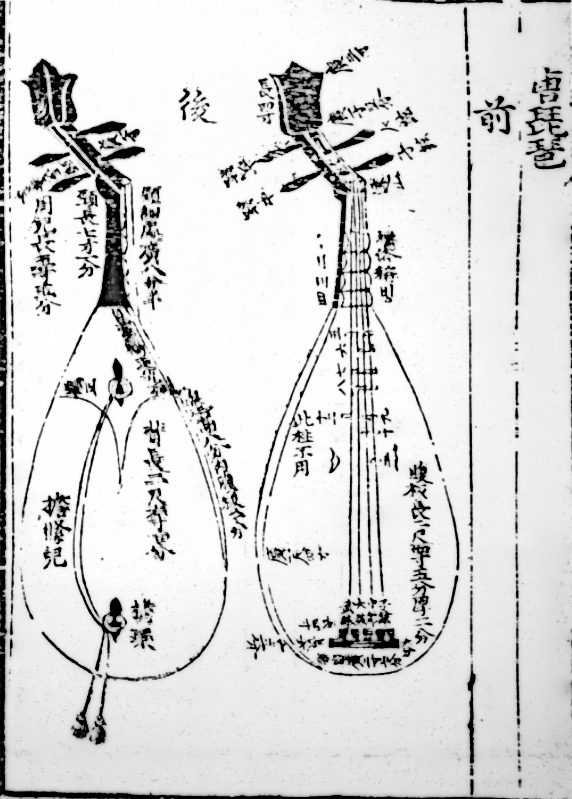
Dang-bipa

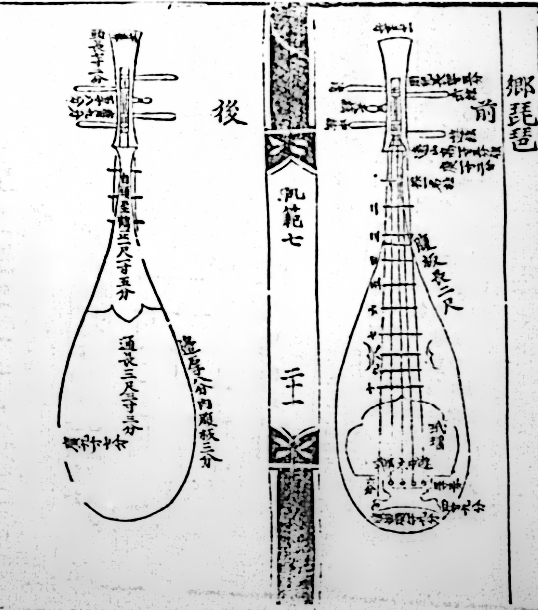
Hyang-bipa

Illustrations from the 15th century Korean work Akhak Gwebeom showing the Tang-style dang-bipa on left and the Silla-style hyang-bipa on right used during the Joseon dynasty. Dang-bipa was played with a plectrum, while the hyang-bipa was played with fingers (or finger-attachments).

The bipa (Korean: 비파; Hanja: 琵琶) is a pear-shaped lute that is a traditional Korean musical instrument. It is derived from Chinese pipa and was introduced through the Silk Road to Goguryeo and Silla. There are two major types of bipa: the four stringed dang-bipa (당비파 / 唐琵琶) and the five stringed hyang-bipa (향비파 / 鄕琵琶). While dang-bipa was a Tang-style pipa first introduced from the Chinese Tang dynasty and localized over time to have Korean characteristics, hyang-bipa was created in the Korean Kingdom of Silla. The instrument is also related to other derivatives such as Vietnamese đàn tỳ bà and the Japanese biwa.

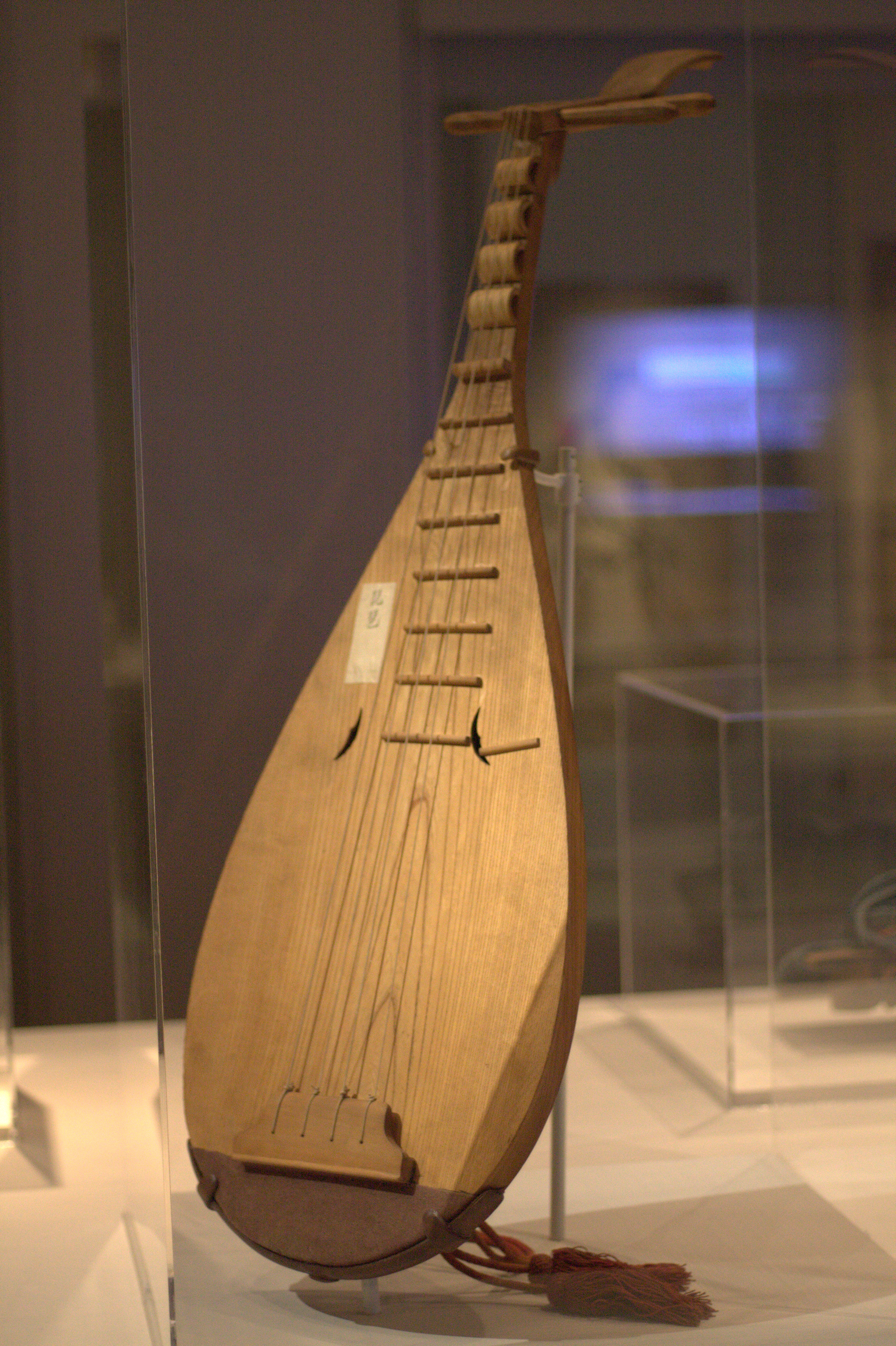
An old Korean bipa dated 1893.

The bipa was popular in court music until it fell out of use in the early 20th century during the Japanese Colonial period. In 1988–1989, there was the first attempt to revive the two bipa that was unsuccessful in commercialization. This revived bipa used the existing modern Chinese pipa as a basis but was modified to the Korean form, and followed Joseon style and Chinese style use of fake nails and Chinese techniques. It also reintroduced the two sound holes on the front characteristic of the two Korean bipa as well as the five strings characteristic of the hyang-bipa. The strings used are of twisted silk, rather than the metal-nylon used for the Chinese pipa. Following this recreation, there were many reinvented modern bipa.

A more faithful restoration of the two bipa is used in contemporary traditional music. In 2007, restoration by National Gugak Center of South Korea followed closely to the two original bipa from Akhak-Gwebeom , not made like the Chinese pipa. This recreation uses silk strings and is plucked with fake nails (formerly used bare fingers) or with a plectrum, stick. This is used for traditional music and sanjo.

== Structure and playing method ==
Both the traditional Dang Bipa and Hyang Bipa had double crescent moons on body and had from 8 to 13 monolithic old bamboo frets (there are types up to 19 frets), especially the Hyang Bipa is painted with floral motifs on the top. The modern multi-frets Hyang Bipa is mostly influenced by the Chinese Pipa frets. In the past, two types of Bipa used twisted silk strings, but nowadays they are rarely used, but instead are made from chemical silk or polyester strings.

=== Hyang bipa ===
The Hyang bipa is a five-stringed pipa, played with a plectrum – the standard type from the Goguryeo dynasty (고구려, 37–668) to the Silla dynasty (신라, −935). It is one of the three types of stringed lutes of the Silla dynasty (besides the geomungo and the gayageum). Apart from the five-stringed, straight-necked and had five pegs; the front side is made of paulownia, the back side is chestnut. Until the Joseon dynasty (조선, 1392–1897), it increased to 10 frets, but modern versions can have up to 12 frets (voice close to three octaves). When performing, musician usually sit, put the lute on their lap in an upright position (slightly leaning to the left), the left hand holds the neck or the body and presses the strings, the right hand uses five fake nails (gajogak) (가조각; 假爪角) to pluck the strings. In the past, people plucked the lute with a suldae – a bamboo stick (influenced from the geomungo), but today the person who preserves the Hyang bipa way of playing is the female musician Go Boseok (고보석) – who can also play Hyang bipa, wolgeum (moon lute), yanggeum and geomungo. Today, most hyang bipa players use the improved hyang bipa from the Chinese pipa, and most of them use techniques from the Chinese pipa, had more frets and especially in new musical compositions.

=== Dang bipa ===
The Dang bipa is a four-stringed lute, with a curved neck with 12 frets, the modern version has a wider range of three octaves. According to the Chinese character Dang (Hangul:唐, pinyin: táng) is a word referring to the Tang dynasty, which means that this type of instrument originated in China and was introduced to Korea during the Tang dynasty. During the Goryeo period (918–1392), it was used in Dangak music. However, since the Korean era, it has also been used in Hyangak. The name Hyangak means "village music", a form of traditional Korean court music that originated during the Three Kingdoms period (삼국시대). In the past, people have tried to restore the way to play Dang-bipa, but it seems to have failed because there are no professional musicians for this type of instrument. As of the early 21st century the Dang bipa has been restored in both its form and playing techniques. It is plucked with a mokbal plectrum (목발; 木撥) (smaller than the bachi used to play the Japanese biwa) or played with a gajogak like the Hyang bipa.

== Notes ==
1. Professor Lee Sung-chun (1936–2003) made an attempt in 1989
