= Fidola =

Small string instrument

String instrument
- Classification: string
- Hornbostel–Sachs classification: chordophone (bar zither)
- Inventor: Alan Carruth
- Developed: 1980s

The fidola, folk viola or fideola is the size of a viola but shaped like a guitar. It has five strings strung like a standard violin and viola (CGDAE). It was invented in the 1980s by Luthier Alan Carruth of Newport, New Hampshire. It is played with a standard viola bow, often strung with black and white hair for a coarser, less classical sound.

== Development ==
The fidola was the culmination of a research effort aimed at producing an instrument that is equally resonant over all five strings, in contrast to earlier five-string violins and violas, which tended to sound dull at either the low (C) or high (E) end. The instrument became popular among Scottish and Contra dance fiddlers through the 1990s, first in New England and then in northern California. A photograph of a fiddler in concert playing a five-string viola explicitly identified as a fidola appears in the scholarly journal Pragmatics, 11(2):155-192, June 2001.

== Other uses ==
Among traditional fiddlers in Alaska, the term fidola was generalized in the late 1990s and came to be used more broadly to refer to any five-string viola, regardless of shape. In the UK, the term fidola has come into use more recently to refer to a standard four-string violin or viola tuned as a viola (CGDA).
