= Bazantar =

Musical instrument

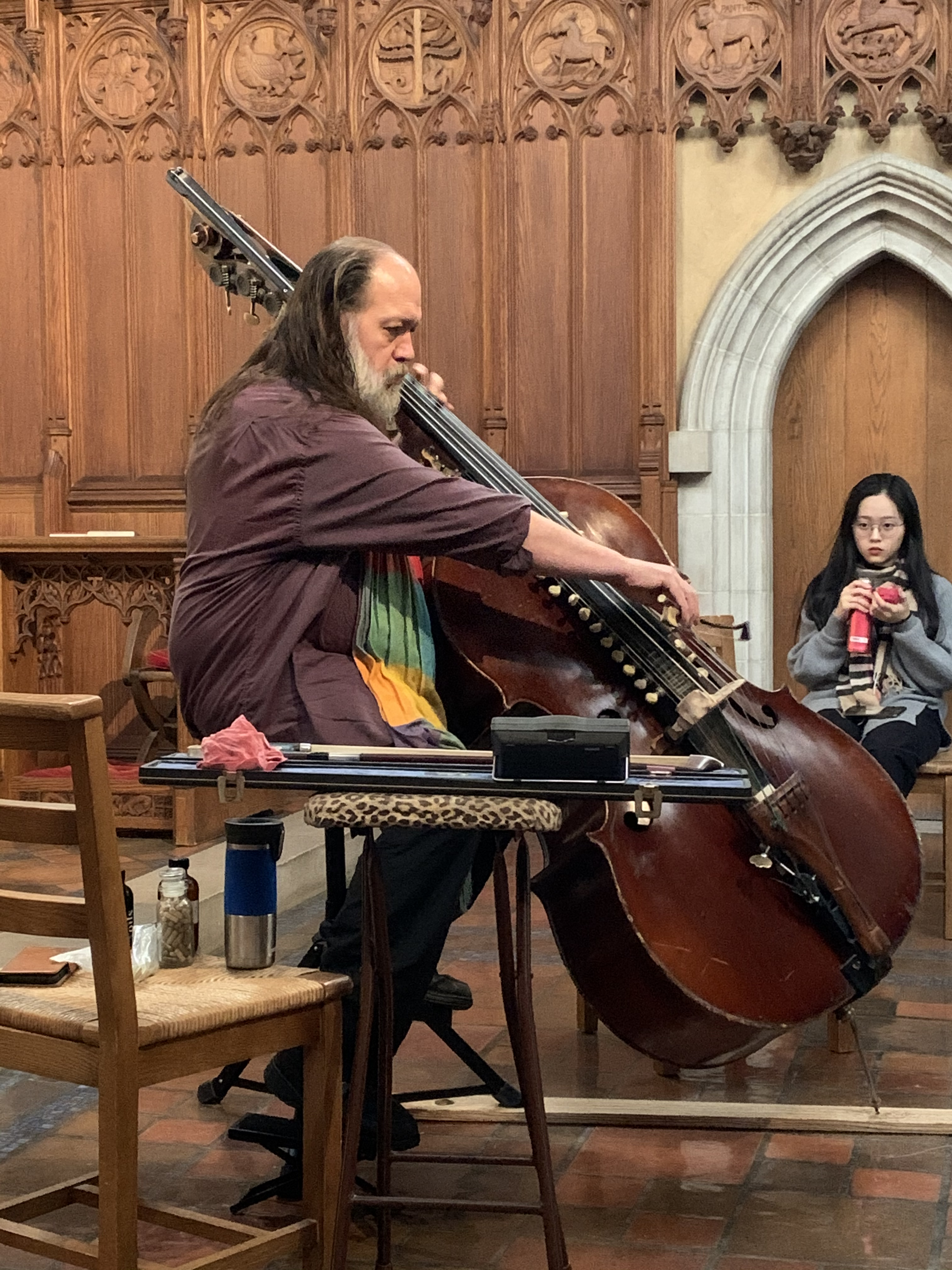
- Classification: Bowed string instrument

Related instruments
- Double bass

The bazantar is a custom made string instrument invented by musician Mark Deutsch, who worked on the design between 1993 and 1997.
