= Chrotta =

Contested Irish instrument

The chrotta, is a musical instrument played in Ireland, whose exact description is contested.

According to Irish historian Gratton Flood, it was a small harp played with a bow. The instrument could be rested on knees or on a table.

Flood notes that the historian Gerbert had described the charota as an oblong instrument with six strings, four of which on a fingerboard and two off of it.

Historian Carl Engel noted that a 6th-century CE Italian writer, Venantius Fortunatus, had mentioned the "Charota Britanna" in a poem, but did not mention any bow.

== See also ==
- Crwth, a similar Welsh instrument
- Rotte
