= Ducheke =

The ducheke is a type of fiddle played by the Nanai people of the Amur River Basin.

== See also ==
- T'yngryng, a Nivkh instrument of Sakhalin
- Huchir, a spike-fiddle of the Buryat Mongols
