= Misa Kitara =

- Manufacturer: Misa Digital Instruments
- Dates: 2011–2012
- Price: US$789

Technical specifications
- Polyphony: Polyphonic
- Oscillator: Yes
- Synthesis type: Digital
- Aftertouch expression: No
- Effects: 6 preloaded

Input/output
- Keyboard: 8 inch multi-touch display, 144 note-buttons
- External control: MIDI, USB

The Misa Kitara is a digital MIDI controller and musical instrument developed in 2011 and discontinued in 2013. It allows for a guitar player to produce a synthesized sound using techniques and motions referential to guitar playing. It is built in the shape of an electric guitar, complete with a full twenty-four fret neck. The name comes from the Finnish word for "guitar".

== History ==
The Kitara was the first digital musical instrument to combine the use of touch buttons for strings and frets with an 8 inch multi-touch screen. The player controls sound effects and parameters through this display, as opposed to strumming strings like on a traditional guitar. The display allows for comprehensive control as well as a wide-variety of noise and effect production. The produced sound changes based on the position, number, and movement of fingers on this display.

The Kitara uses an internal wavetable synthesizer with effects to generate sound. The Kitara is powered by an open-sourced Linux based CPU, making it possible to reprogram the Kitara, modify existing sounds, and program new ones.

At the 2012 NAMM Show Misa Digital announced a stripped-down Kitara which does not have a synth engine. It went on sale on the Misa site Misa Tri-Bass.
