= Sorahi =

Iranian musical instrument

The Sorahi (Persian: صراحی) is a new Iranian musical instrument. A member of the family of bowed string instruments developed by the Iranian musician Mohammad-Reza Shajarian, This string instrument can cover the sound range produced by soprano, alto, bass and contra bass instruments.

The instrument fits into Iranian traditions of bowed instruments that include the Classical kemençe or kamancheh and ghaychak fiddles. The instrument has a mechanism for changing the instrument's tone; a pad made of leather, or leather and wood sits between the bridge and the soundboard. The instrument is played in the same manner as the kamancheh, held upright on the players lap.

Shahnaz ensemble, accompanied by M. R. Shajarian, held a concert from 9 to 13 October 2008 in Tehran featuring Sorahi.

== Sources ==
- "صراحی" استاد شجریان رونمایی می شود, Mehrnews (in Persian)
