= Gunjac =

Croatian violincello-like instrument with two strings

The gunjac (plural: gunjci) or bajs is a violoncello-like Croatian instrument but with only two strings. Gunjac instrumentalists are called bajsisti. It is a double bass string instrument played with a bow.

The gunjac is commonly found in melodic groupings (tunes) associated with North-Western and Central Croatia including the regions of Zagreb, Žumberak, Pokuplje, Upper Posavina, Moslavina, and Bilogora.

An international festival of bajs players is held annually in Draguć, Istria.
