= Yanggeum =

Korean musical instrument

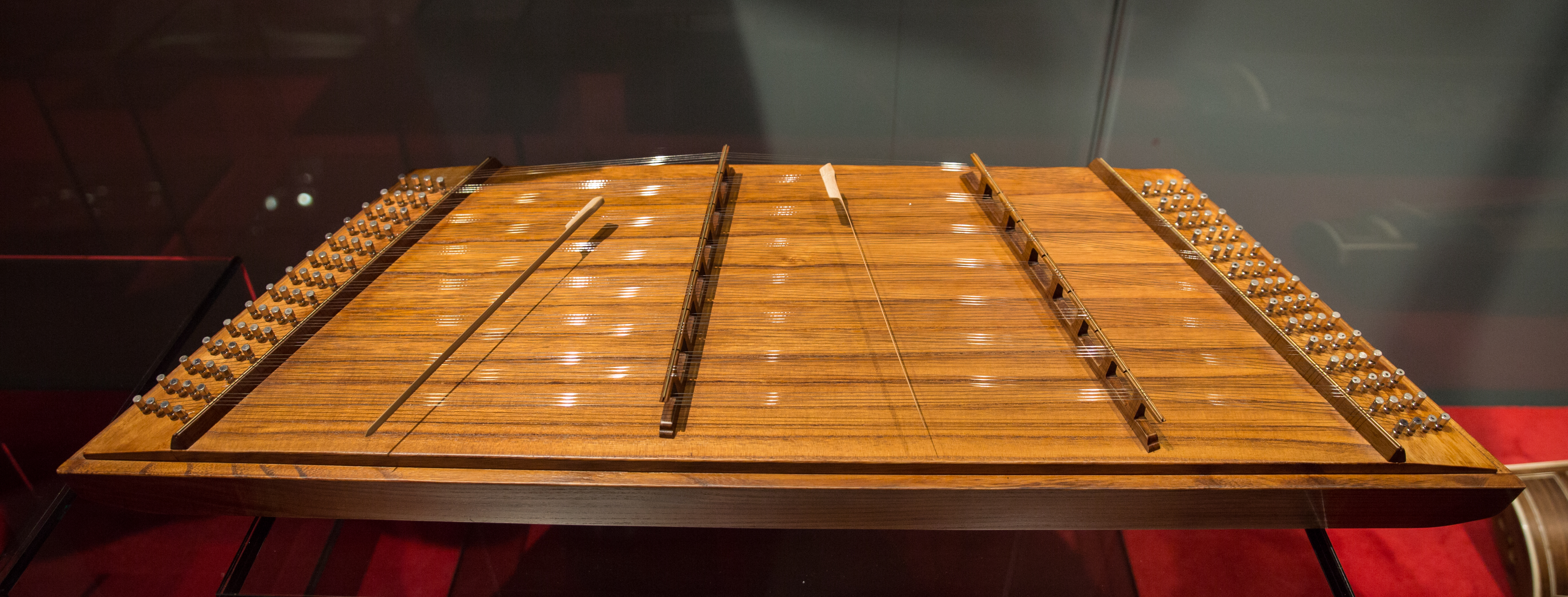

Korean name
- Hangul: 양금
- Hanja: 洋琴
- RR: yanggeum
- MR: yanggŭm

The yanggeum (Korean: 양금; Hanja: 洋琴) is a traditional Korean string instrument. It is a hammered dulcimer. Unlike other traditional Korean instruments (most of which have silk strings), the yanggeum has metal strings. It is played by striking the strings with a bamboo stick. Yanggeum means a stringed instrument of the West (yang). The yanggeum is also called seoyanggeum ("Western stringed instrument") or gura cheolsageum (歐邏鐵絲琴,"European metal stringed instrument"). The yanggeum's origin is based on a South Asian instrument called the santoor. It was introduced to Korea in the 18th century via China. Its body is flat and trapezoidal, with seven sets of four metal strings. The right hand strikes the strings with a thin bamboo strip.

== See also ==
- Yangqin
- Hammered dulcimer
- Santur
- Santoor
- Traditional Korean musical instruments
