= Tricordia =

Variation of mandolin

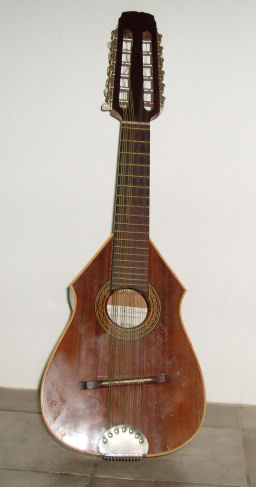
- Other names: Mandriola
- Classification: String instrument (plucked)
- Hornbostel–Sachs classification: 321.321 (Composite chordophone)

Playing range
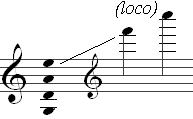
- (a regularly tuned tricordia with 14 frets to body)

Related instruments
- List: Mandolin; Mandola; Octave mandola; Mandocello; Mandobass

A tricordia (also trichordia or tricordio) or mandriola is a twelve-stringed variation of the mandolin. The tricordia is used in Mexican folk music, while its European cousin, the mandriola, is played in the same manner as the mandolin. It differs from a standard mandolin in that it has three strings per course. Mandriolas are typically in unison tuning (G3 G3 G3 • D4 D4 D4 • A4 A4 A4 • E5 E5 E5), while tricordias use either unison tuning or octave tuning (G2 G3 G3 • D3 D4 D4 • A3 A4 A4 • E4 E5 E5).
