= Đàn tỳ bà =

Vietnamese plucked string instrument

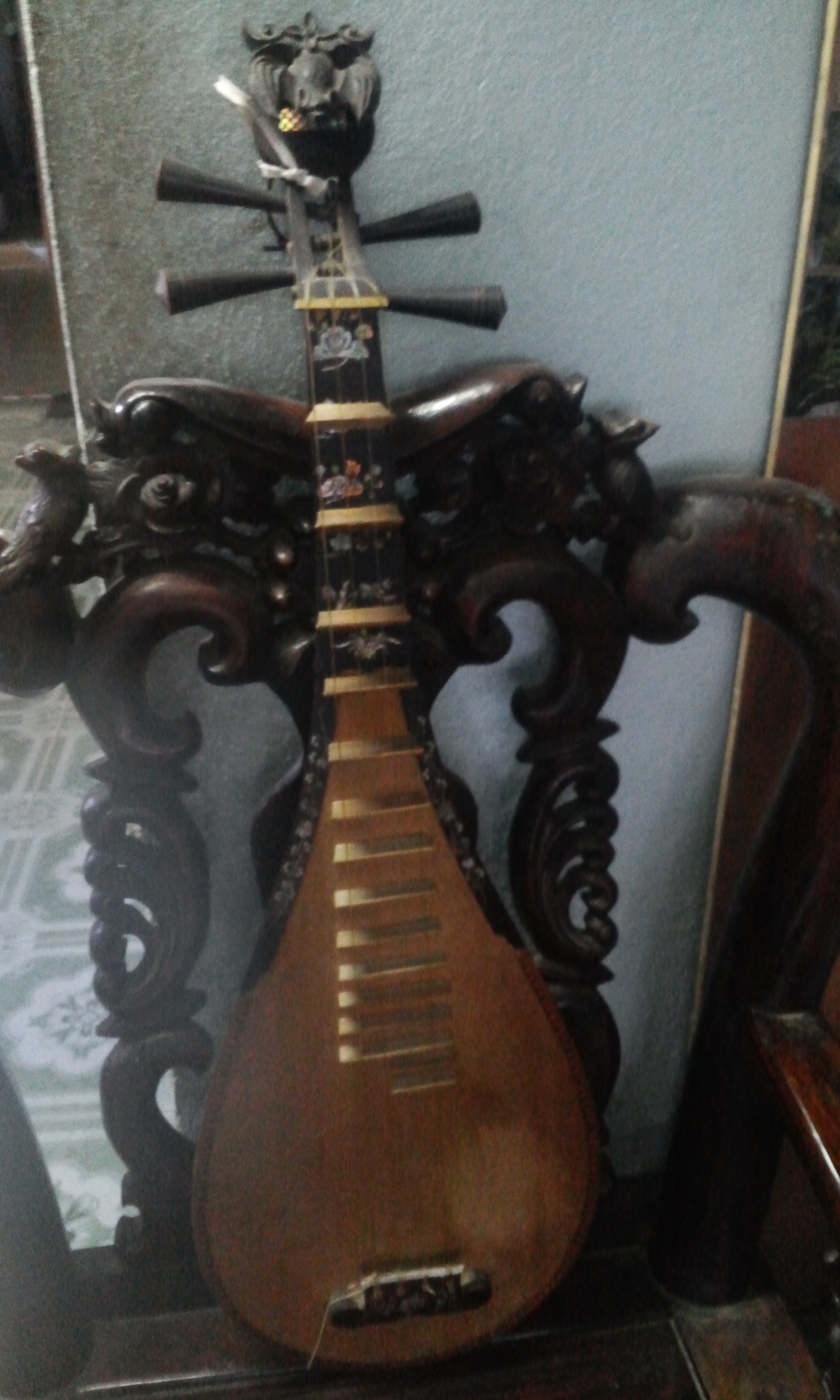
- Đàn tỳ bà on a chair.

String instrument
- Classification: Plucked string instrument

Related instruments
- Pipa; Liuqin

Musicians
- Phạm Thị Huệ

Sound sample

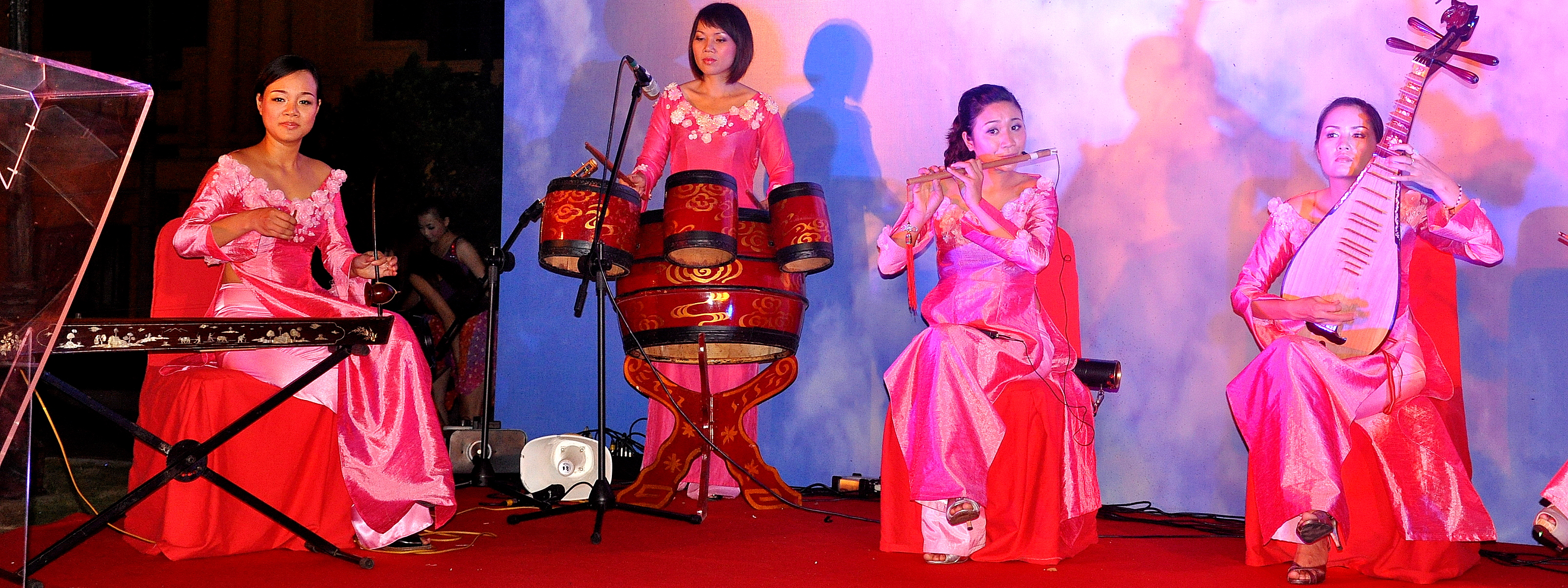
The girl on the far right is playing the đàn tỳ bà

The đàn tỳ bà or đàn tì bà (Vietnamese: [ɗàːn tì ɓàː], Chữ Nôm: 彈琵琶) is a Vietnamese traditional plucked string instrument derived from the Chinese pipa, That first gained popularity in China before spreading throughout East Asia, eventually reaching Vietnam sometime during the Trần dynasty.

It is made of wood, with a pear shape and four strings made of nylon (formerly twisted silk). The instrument is held in a near-vertical position when playing and its playing technique involves frequent bending of the tones with the fingers of the left hand. The strings are plucked with a small plectrum similar to a guitar's but larger. It was associated with the royal court and is still used in the ensemble that performs at the Imperial Palace at Huế.

The instrument's name is a Vietnamization of the name of the Chinese pear-shaped lute, called pipa, from which the đàn tỳ bà is derived. "Đàn" is the Vietnamese prefix meaning "stringed instruments", which is part of the name of most traditional stringed instruments of the Viet majority. During the Ly–Tran dynasties (possibly to the Later Le dynasty), the đàn tỳ bà had a similar shape to the Japanese biwa, but no longer used now. Instead, from the Nguyen dynasty to the present day, the đàn tỳ bà was influenced by the pipa from the Ming dynasty and Qing dynasty of China, but it was also improved to fit Vietnamese culture.

== See also ==
- Music of Vietnam
- Pipa
- Biwa
- Bipa
