= Guitarrón chileno =

Plucked string instrument

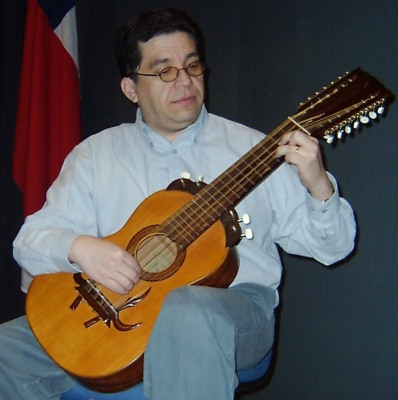
Playing guitarrón chileno

The Guitarrón Chileno (literally: "large Chilean guitar") is a guitar-shaped plucked string instrument from Chile, with 25, 24 (rarely), or even 26 strings. Its primary contemporary use is as the instrumental accompaniment for the traditional Chilean genre of singing poetry known as Canto a lo Poeta, though a few virtuosi have also begun to develop the instrument's solo possibilities.

== History and use ==
The origin of the Guitarrón Chileno may date back to the 16th century. Although the name suggests an instrument derived from the guitar, the design, tuning, and playing technique of the instrument are more closely linked to a common ancestor of the guitar, the vihuela of the Renaissance and Baroque. There are also some design similarities to the Baroque archlutes, though a direct connection is uncertain. Technologically the instrument has followed an evolution similar to that of the guitar. The old instruments used tied-on gut frets and friction tuning pegs (similar to the violin), but modern instruments employ metal frets and geared tuning machines, like those of modern guitars.

Originally the guitarrón chileno was a folk instrument seen primarily in rural areas; however, recent interest in "world music", and in the revival of traditional folk music forms has led to increased interest in the instrument in more urban areas and contemporary musical settings. The Guitarrón Chileno is mainly used to accompany el Canto a lo Poeta (the Poet Singing), an old Chilean folk genre that combines décima (a ten-line poetic form) and payada (improvisation). The music embraces two main groups of themes: Canto a lo Divino, lit. "Singing to the Divine" (solemn, religious, more prepared themes) and Canto a lo Humano, lit. "Singing to the Human" (humorous, amorous, and social criticism themes). This instrument is also used to perform in other musical forms like cuecas, tonadas, valses and polkas.

== Design and construction ==
As with most relatives of the guitar, the guitarrón chileno is constructed of wood and the same major sections may be distinguished in its construction:

- Head/Headstock: Heavy and very long, it is sized to give support to the 20-21 primary strings with their respective tuners. The headstock is sometimes decorated with carvings.
- Tuners: Older instruments used friction peg tuners similar to those found on violins, but modern instruments usually employ geared tuning machines similar to those used on modern classical guitars. These are mounted in a slotted setup similar to that on classical guitars, but there are three slots for tuners, as opposed to the usual two.
- Neck/Fingerboard: This is wider than the standard guitar (ca. 6.5-7.5 cm), and frequently is fitted with only 8 frets, although some modern models are fully fretted with 18 or 19 frets like a modern classical guitar. Originally the frets were movable cords of gut, similar to the frets employed on Renaissance lutes, but modern instruments use metal frets like those found on guitars.
- Body: In its more traditional construction the body is a bit shorter overall, and narrower at the bouts than the guitar, but also somewhat deeper. Typical dimensions are: length 45–50 cm; width (upper bout) 23–24 cm; width (lower bout) 29–30 cm; depth 11–12 cm. Many models have a simple sound hole (8–9 cm), although some specimens show highly decorative rosettes. The bridge frequently has showy extensions called "daggers" that extend along the top. On each upper bout are two "auxiliary" tuning machines, for tuning the four outlying strings (two on each side of the neck). These outlying strings are known as "diablitos" (lit. "little devils"), "tiples" (trebles), or simply, "Devils".

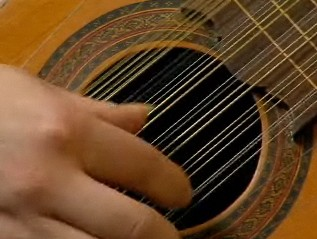
A close-up of the string arrangement

- Strings: The string arrangement may be seen where strings pass over the sound hole of the guitarrón in the illustration. Current general practice is to use strings of metal (generally steel) both plain and wound; on historical instruments metal, gut, and nylon were often mixed, even within a single course. These strings are grouped in courses of various numbers of strings. Five courses pass over the fingerboard, and each of these courses has usually either six, five, four, or three strings in it. The contemporary standard is to group the strings in courses of 5, 6, 4 (or 5), 3, and 3 (from low to high), but there is also some variation among models. Thus for some instruments the number of strings in a particular course may differ from this standard, though the total number of strings will remain 24, 25, or 26.

One of the most distinctive features of the guitarrón chileno is the "little devils": four short, high-pitched strings, arranged two on each side of the neck, which run from tuners on the upper bouts to auxillaty pins on the sides of the bridge near the daggers, the 2 Devils on the Right are tuned to the Tonic Chord of the Key while the 2 Devils on the Left are tuned to the Dominant Chord of the Key.

== Tuning ==
Strings within a course are tuned either in unison or in octaves; tuning between courses is in fourths, except between the second and third courses where the interval is a major third. With the instrument held in playing position, the stringing is: devil, devil, 5 (or 4)-string course, 6 (or 5)-string course, 5 (or 4)-string course, 3-string course, 3-string course, devil, devil, and the most common tuning is:

F#5 • A4 • (D4) D4 D3 D3 D2 • (G4) G4 G4 G4 G3 G3 • (C4) C4 C4 C3 C2 • E4 E4 E4 • A4 A4 A4 • G4 • B4

Either the fifth course or the third course may sometimes have only four strings, and the fourth course sometimes only has five, depending on the individual instrument design.

One common variant of this tuning is to eliminate the middle octaves in the fifth course, thus:

F#5 • A4 • (D4) D4 D4 D4 D2 • (G4) G4 G4 G4 G3 G3 • (C4) C4 C4 C3 C2 • E4 E4 E4 • A4 A4 A4 • G4 • B4

The entire instrument is sometimes transposed to accommodate the voice of the singer. For example, all notes in the above "G tuning" may be raised a whole step, to produce an "A tuning".

Traditionally, tunings are confined to a range which favors the male voice, as most guitarroneras were, until quite recently, male. Modern female guitarroneras have mostly devised new playing patterns on the "male" instrument, but a few makers have been experimenting with novel stringing that allow the instrument to be tuned up to C or D (Either with Nylon strings or Special Metal Strings designed for C or D Tuning), to better accommodate a female vocal range.

== Playing ==
The traditional playing method for the guitarrón chileno is to pluck the strings with the finger tips and nails of the right hand. Typically only the thumb and index finger are employed, especially in the payada styles or some players use fingerpicks. The left hand frets strings on the fingerboard in a manner similar to that of the guitar and other guitar-like instruments.

== Notable players ==
- Hugo Arévalo
- Marcello Navarro Francke
- Nicolás Membriani
- Alfonso Rubio Morales
- Santos Rubio Morales
- Manuel Sánchez
- Nano Stern
- Osvaldo Chosto Ulloa
