= Vietnam National Academy of Music =

- Vietnamese: Học viện Âm nhạc Quốc gia Việt Nam
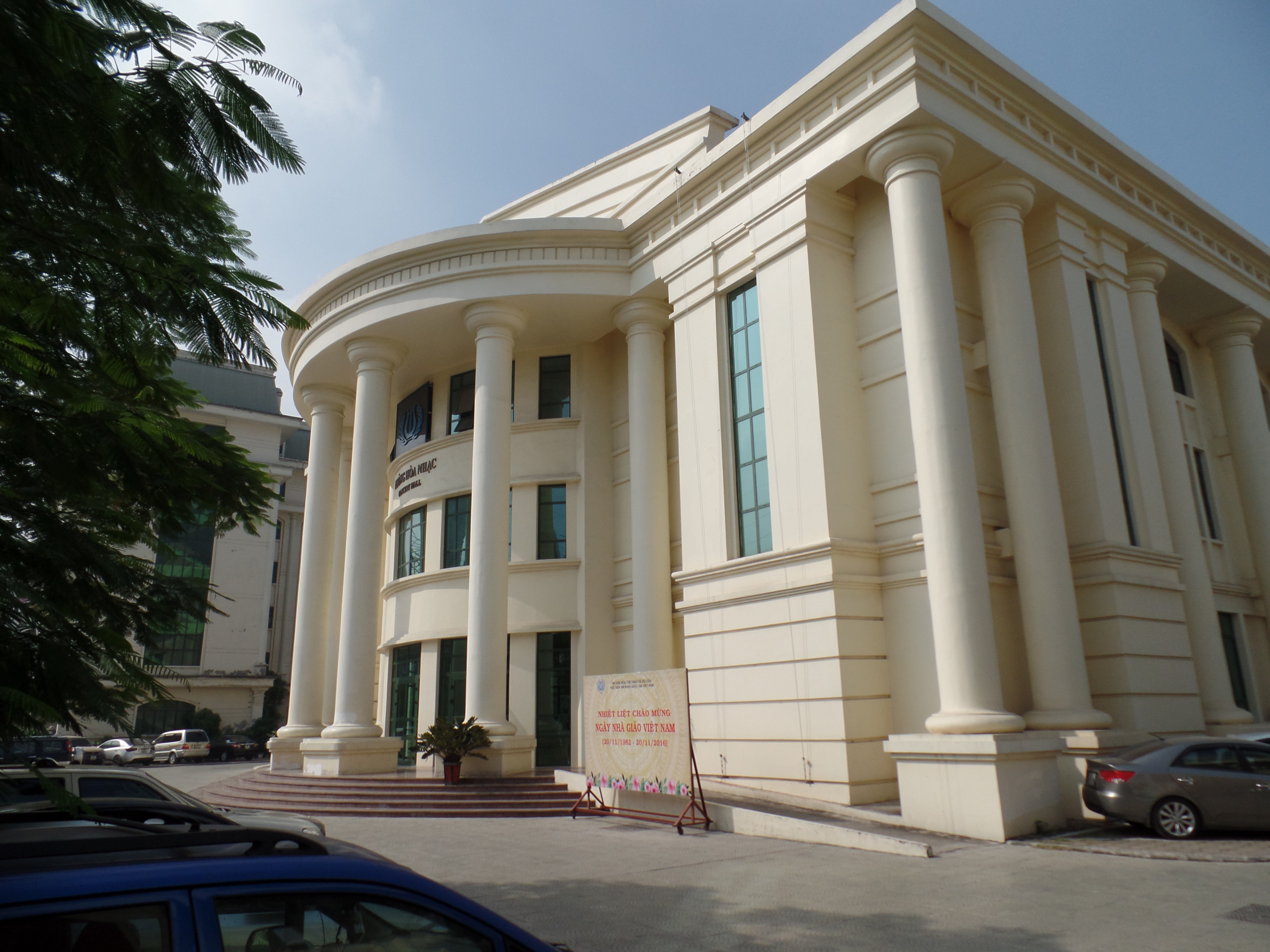
- Former names: Vietnam School of Music (1956-1982); Hanoi Conservatory of Music (1982-2008)
- Type: Public, Conservatory, Research university
- Established: 1956
- Affiliations: Ministry of Culture, Sports and Tourism
- Endowment: ₫48,838,000,000
- Chairperson: Dr. Nguyen Huy Phuong
- Director: Dr. Le Anh Tuan
- Academic staff: 359 (2023/24)
- Students: 1500
- Location: 77 Hào Nam Street, Hanoi; 21.0228°N 105.8260°E
- Campus: 18,985 m^{2} (4.691 acres)
- Language: Vietnamese
- Website: www.vnam.edu.vn

The Vietnam National Academy of Music (Vietnamese: Học viện Âm nhạc Quốc gia Việt Nam), formerly the Hanoi Conservatory of Music, is the major classical and traditional music teaching institution in Vietnam.

== History ==
Originally established in 1956 as the Vietnam School of Music (Trường Âm nhạc Việt Nam) and conferred university status in 1982, the Conservatory is Vietnam’s premier music training, research and performance institute. On 27 February 2008, the Hanoi Conservatory of Music changed its name to the Vietnam National Academy of Music (VNAM).

== Academic activity ==
It offers eleven-year Secondary Certificate programmes and four-year Bachelor of Music programmes, plus two-year Master of Music programmes and Doctoral research. The Conservatory currently has over 1,000 students at various levels. The majority of its 200-plus teaching staff (which include 17 Nghệ sĩ Ưu tú or Excellent Artists) are graduates of overseas conservatories in the former Soviet Union, Western Europe, North America and Japan. To date the institution has trained over 7,500 students, including overseas students from Russia, France, Japan, Germany, China, the United States, Cambodia and Laos.

The Academy also functions as an important music performance centre, staging numerous concerts throughout the year in the Hanoi Conservatory of Music Concert Hall. It also participates in many exchange programmes with overseas conservatories, sending its musical ensembles abroad to perform and teach and in turn hosting performance and teaching visits by many internationally acclaimed orchestras and soloists.

The Vietnam National Academy of Music now has over 1500 students.

== Affiliated institutions ==
=== Vietnamese Traditional Orchestra ===
The Vietnamese Traditional Orchestra played its inaugural concert on 28 May 2009 at Hanoi Opera House. As the name suggests, they specialise in traditional Vietnamese musical instruments. The orchestra has performed at important national events, notably as part of the celebration of the Millennial Anniversary of Hanoi in 2010 and at the 132nd Inter-Parliamentary Union assembly hosted in Hanoi in 2015.

=== Hanoi Philharmonic Orchestra ===
In addition to teaching, the Conservatory is home to Hanoi Philharmonic Orchestra, made up of faculty, talented students and other professional musicians. The group regularly performs at the Nhà Hát Lớn (Hanoi Opera House). Many of its members go on to play for Vietnam National Symphony Orchestra.

=== Vietnamese Institute for Musicology ===
Founded in 1950, the institute specialises in archiving and researching traditional Vietnamese music. The institute was initially established as Division of Musicology, under the Department of Literature and Arts, which is part of the Ministry of Education. The organisation was then moved over to the Ministry of Culture and its various iterations. In 2008, the Institute of Musicology became part of Vietnam National Academy of Music.

== Notable people ==
=== Alumni ===
==== Singers ====
- Ái Vân
- Bằng Kiều
- Mỹ Linh
- Nguyễn Trần Trung Quân
- Quý Dương
- Thanh Lam
- Thùy Chi
- Trần Thu Hà
- Trần Hiếu
- Trọng Tấn
- Trung Kiên
- Tùng Dương

==== Composers and songwriters ====
- Đặng Hữu Phúc
- Quốc Trung
- Phú Quang - studied French horn performance

==== Instrumentalists ====
- Bui Cong Duy - violinist
- Đặng Thái Sơn - pianist
- Nguyễn Thanh Tùng - traditional Vietnamese instrumentalist, specialising in đàn bầu (Vietnamese monochord).
- Phạm Thị Huệ - player of đàn bầu, đàn đáy, đàn tỳ bà, known for her work in the revival of ca trù; also a lecturer at the academy

=== Academics ===
- Dương Thụ - composer-songwriter; former lecturer in composition
- Hoàng Vân - composer-songwriter; former lecturer in composition
- Lưu Hữu Phước - composer; former professor and director of the Institute for Musicology (1978)
- Michael Denhoff - composer and cellist, former visiting lecturer
- Nguyễn Văn Thương - composer; former director of the academy (1972-1984)
- Quyền Văn Minh - jazz musician; saxophone lecturer
- Văn Cao - composer of Tiến quân ca, the national anthem of Vietnam; former director of the Institute for Musicology (1950-1956)
