= Đàn bầu =

Vietnamese stringed instrument

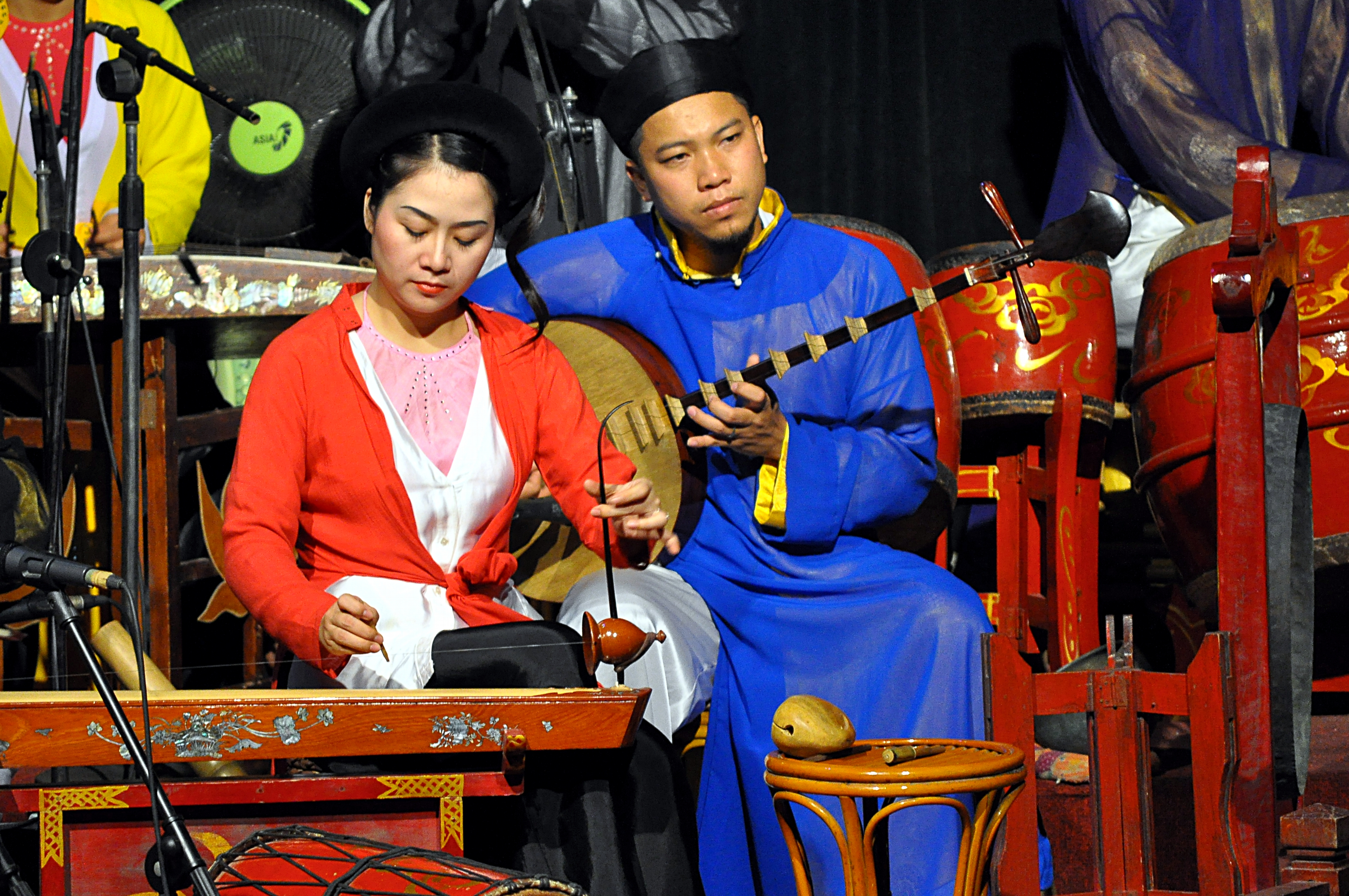
- A woman is playing the đàn bầu during the water puppet show. Next to her is a man playing the đàn nguyệt.

String instrument
- Other names: monochord, độc huyền cầm
- Classification: Monochord

Musicians
- Phạm Thị Huệ; Nguyễn Thanh Tùng

The đàn bầu (Vietnamese: [ɗàːn.ɓə̀w]; "gourd zither"; Chữ Nôm: 彈匏), also called độc huyền cầm (獨絃琴, "one-string zither"; the name is only used by the Jing ethnicity in China) is a Vietnamese stringed instrument, in the form of a monochord (one-string) zither.

== History ==
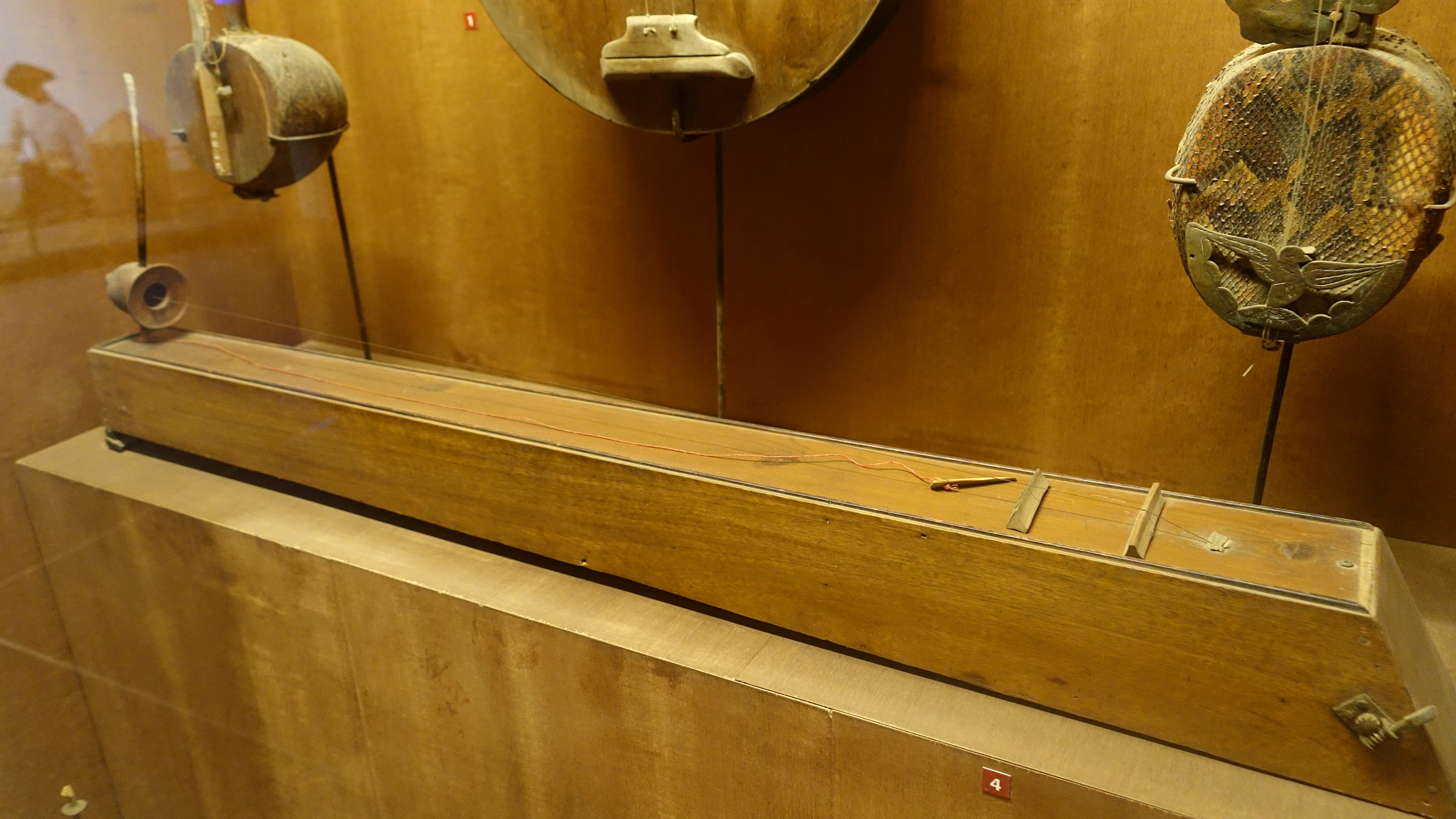
Ancient đàn bầu in the Vietnam Museum of Ethnology

While the earliest written records of the đàn bầu date its origin to 1770, scholars estimate its age to be up to one thousand years older than that. A popular legend of its beginning tells of a blind woman playing it in the market to earn a living for her family while her husband was at war. Whether this tale is based in fact or not, it remains true that the đàn bầu has historically been played by blind musicians. Until recent times, its soft volume limited the musical contexts in which it could be used. The đàn bầu, played solo, is central to Vietnamese folk music, a genre still popular today in the country. Its other traditional application is as an accompaniment to poetry readings. With the invention of the magnetic pickup, the usage of the đàn bầu spread to ensembles and also to contemporary Asian pop and rock music. Now, electronics designed for the electric guitar are sometimes employed with the đàn bầu to further expand its tonal palette.

== Construction ==
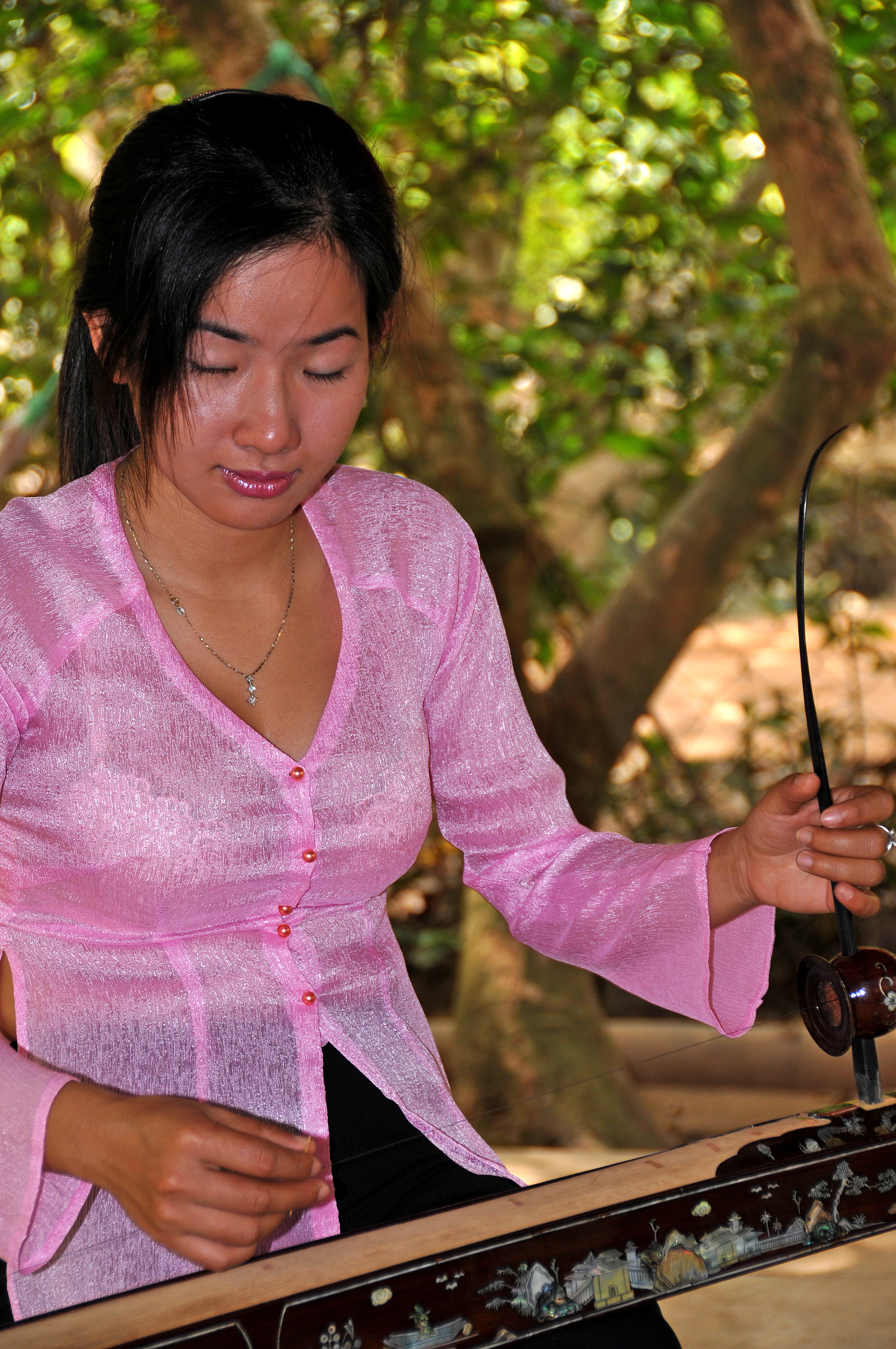
A girl in the Mekong Delta playing the đàn bầu

Originally, the đàn bầu was a tube zither, made of just four parts: a bamboo tube, a wooden rod, a coconut shell half, and a silk string. The string was strung across the bamboo, tied on one end to the rod, which is perpendicularly attached to the bamboo. The coconut shell was attached to the rod, serving as a resonator. In present days, the bamboo has been replaced by a wooden soundboard, with hardwood as the sides and softwood as the middle. An electric guitar string has replaced the traditional silk string. While the gourd is still present, it is now generally made of wood, acting only as a decorative feature. Also, most đàn bầu now have modern tuning machines, so the base pitch of the string can be adjusted. Usually, the instrument is tuned to one octave below middle C, about 131 Hz, but it can be tuned to other notes to make it easier to play in keys distant from C.

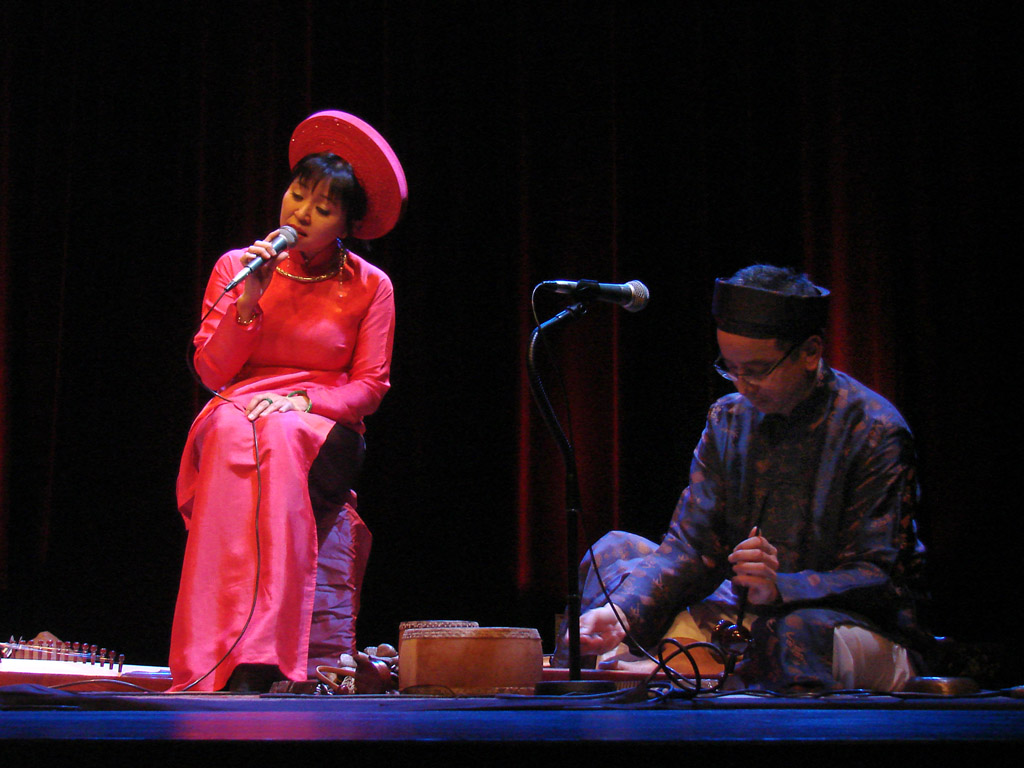
The musician on the right playing the đàn bầu.

== Playing ==
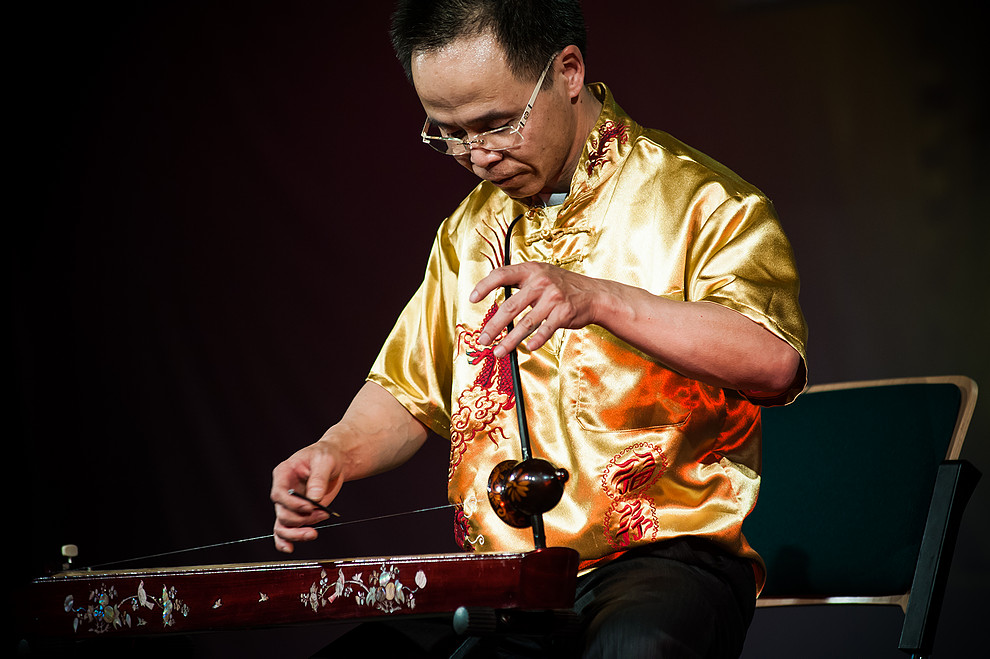
A man playing the đàn bầu

The đàn bầu technique appears relatively simple at first glance, but actually requires a great deal of precision. The fifth finger of the musician's right hand rests lightly on the string at one of seven commonly used nodes, while the thumb and index finger pluck the string using a long plectrum. The nodes are the notes of the first seven overtones, or flageolets, similar to guitar harmonics at the string positions above the octave (1/2), the perfect fifth (2/3), the perfect fourth (3/4), the just major third (4/5), the just minor third (5/6) and two tones not present on the Western musical scale: the septimal minor third (6/7) and the septimal whole tone (7/8). With the left hand, the player pushes the flexible rod toward the instrument with the index finger to lower the pitch of the note, or pushes it away from the instrument with the thumb to raise the pitch. This technique is used to play notes not available at a node, or to add vibrato to any note.

== Related instruments ==
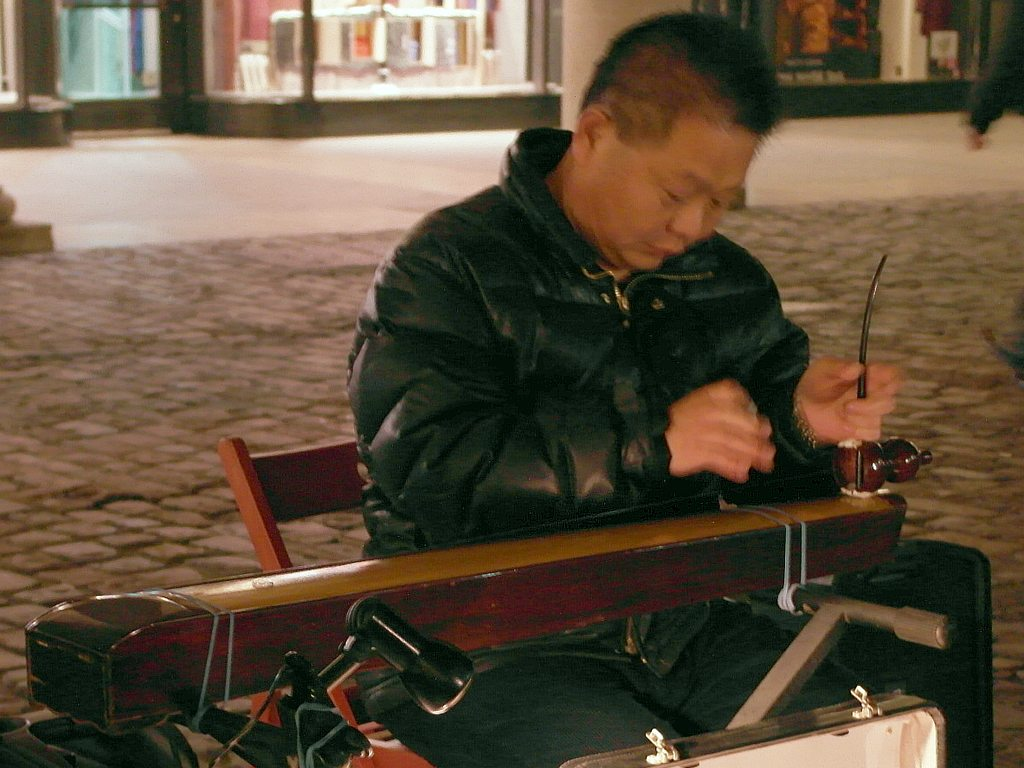
A duxianqin performer, Gui Duo Chang, at Covent Garden, London

The dúxiánqín (Sino-Vietnamese: độc huyền cầm; Chinese: 獨絃琴) is essentially the same instrument but given a Mandarin name, played by the Jing people in China, who are ethnically Vietnamese. The instrument was introduced to China when the Jing Islands off the coast of Dongxing, Guangxi were ceded to China by France.

The Mường people play an instrument called "Đàn Máng" or "Tàn Máng", which is virtually identical to acoustic đàn bầu forms.
