= Duxianqin =

Chinese plucked string instrument

- Traditional Chinese: 獨弦琴
- Simplified Chinese: 独弦琴
- Literal meaning: "lone string zither"
Transcriptions
Standard Mandarin
- Hanyu Pinyin: dúxiánqín
- Yale Romanization: dú-syán-chín
- IPA: [tǔɕjɛ̌ntɕʰǐn]

Alternative Chinese name
- Chinese: 一弦琴
- Literal meaning: "one string zither"
Transcriptions
Standard Mandarin
- Hanyu Pinyin: yīxiánqín
- Yale Romanization: yī-syán-chín

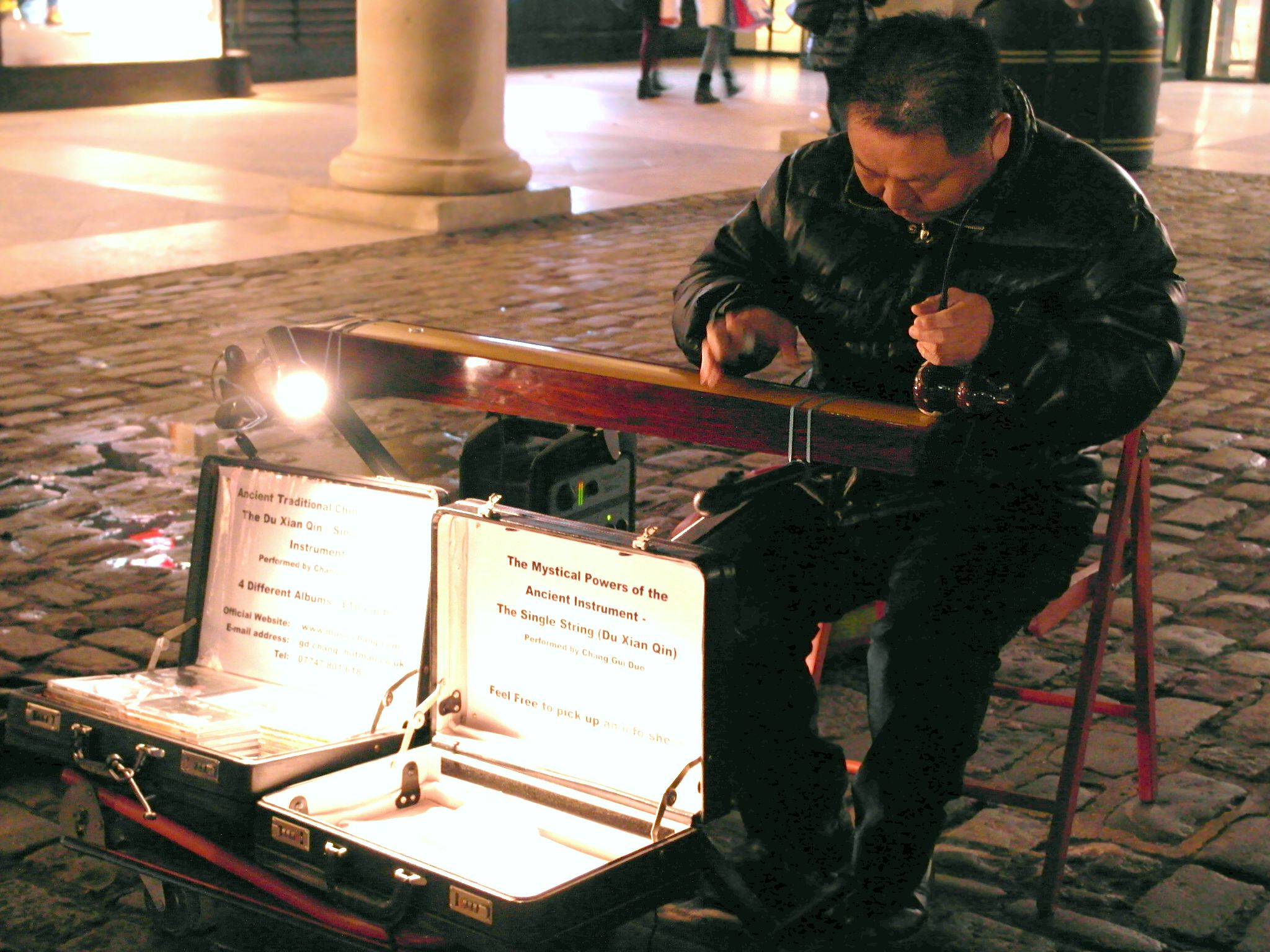
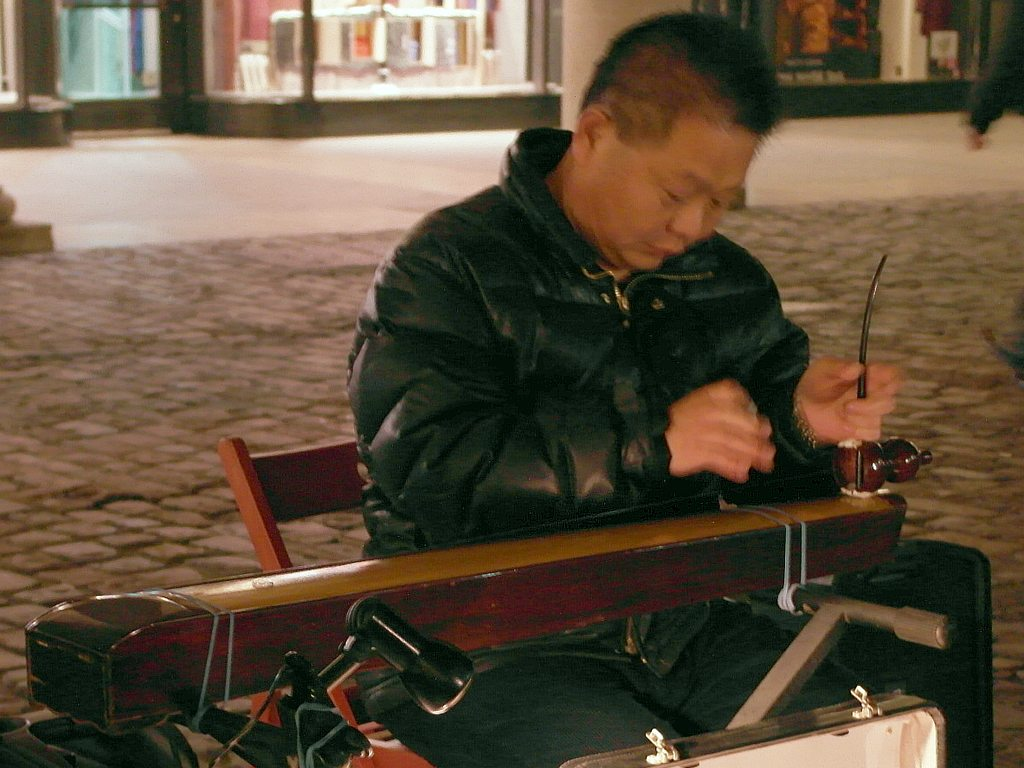
A duxianqin performer, Gui Duo Chang, at Covent Garden, London

The duxianqin is a Chinese plucked string instrument with only one string; it is derived from the Vietnamese đàn bầu. Chinese sources describe duxianqin as being an instrument of the Jing (also spelled Gin or Kinh) ethnic group, who are ethnic Vietnamese living in China. It is still commonly played by this ethnic group. Sometimes the body of the instrument is made from a large tube of bamboo rather than wood, which is more common in Vietnam.

== Cultural context ==
The duxianqin has been recognized by the Chinese government to be "a vehicle of 'intangible cultural heritage,' which can be defined as song, music, dance, drama, crafts and similar prized skills that can be recorded but not touched or interacted with." The cultural significance of duxianqin as a traditional instrument for ethnic groups is commonly accepted and enjoyed within China. It is common for groups of duxianqin players to come together to play at large-scale and small-scale Chinese festivals.

== Playing the duxianqin ==
The duxianqin is played using harmonics, with the string's tension varied by the use of a flexible rod. The string is plucked with the right hand, and the pitch is simultaneously controlled with the left hand by moving the rod to adjust the tension on the string. Depending on the direction that the rod is turned, either toward or away from the player, it will bend the pitch of the string to higher or lower notes.

== See also ==
- Đàn bầu
- Diddley bow
- Traditional Chinese musical instruments
