= Water puppetry =

Vietnamese tradition

- Vietnamese alphabet: Múa rối nước
- Chữ Nôm: 𦨂𦇒渃
- Literal meaning: Making puppets dance (on) water

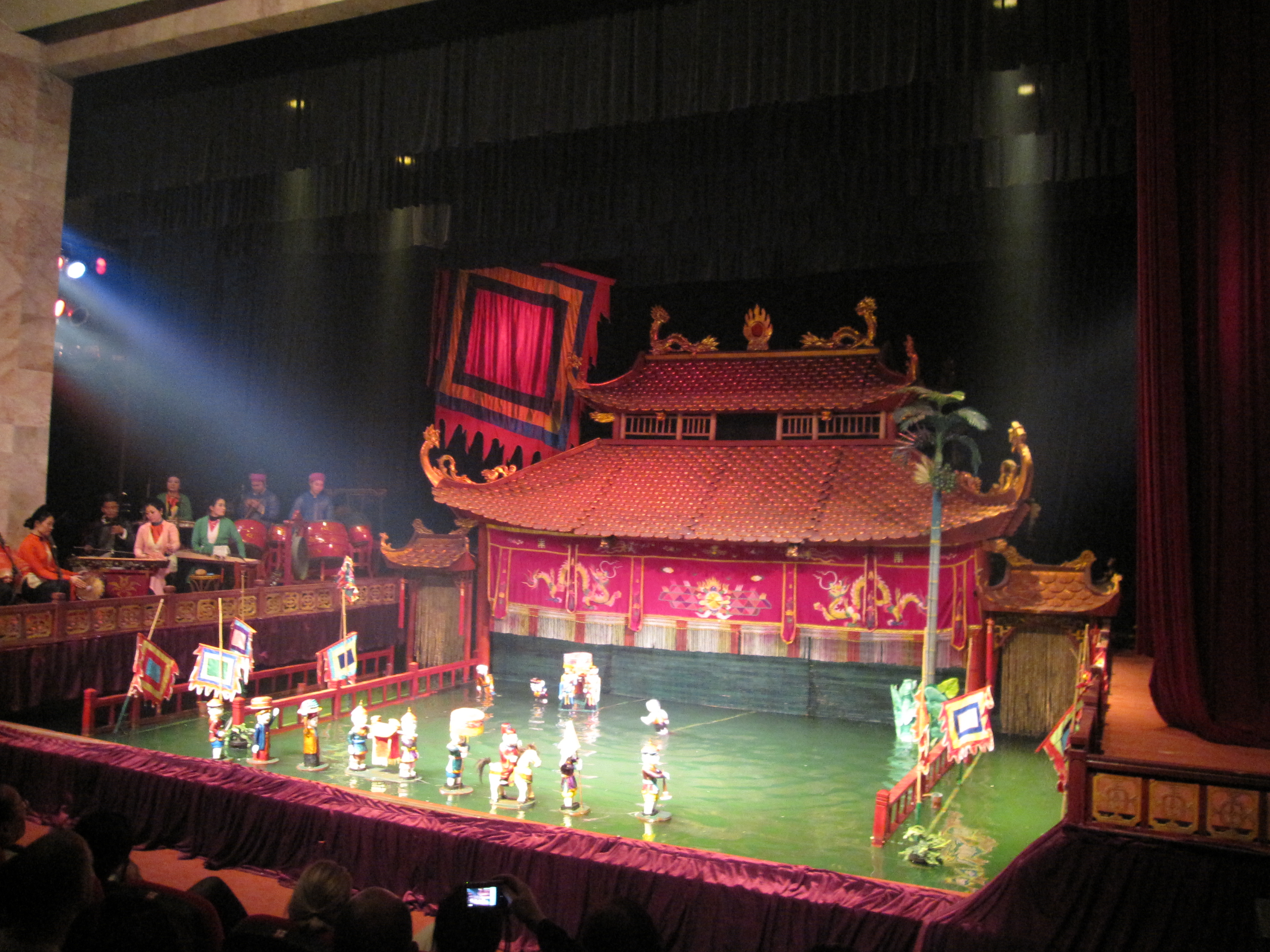
Performance of the water puppet theatre Thăng Long, in Hanoi

Water puppetry (Vietnamese: Múa rối nước) is a Vietnamese tradition that dates back as far as the 11th century, when it originated in the villages of the Red River Delta, in the north of the country. Vietnamese water puppetry is a variation on the ancient Asian puppet tradition.

The puppets are made out of wood and then lacquered. The shows are performed in a waist-deep pool. A large bamboo rod supports the puppet under the water and is used by the puppeteers, who are normally hidden behind a screen, to control them. Thus the puppets appear to be moving over the water. When rice fields would flood, the villagers would entertain each other using this form of puppet play.

== Performance ==
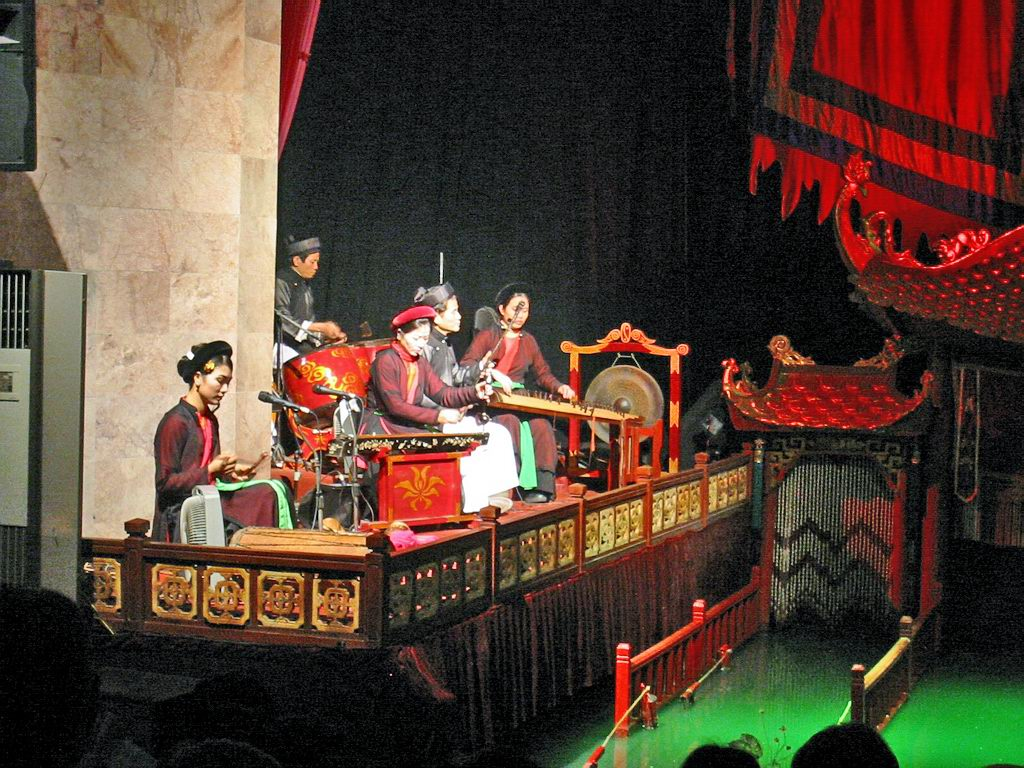
An orchestra accompanies the performance with traditional music and song.

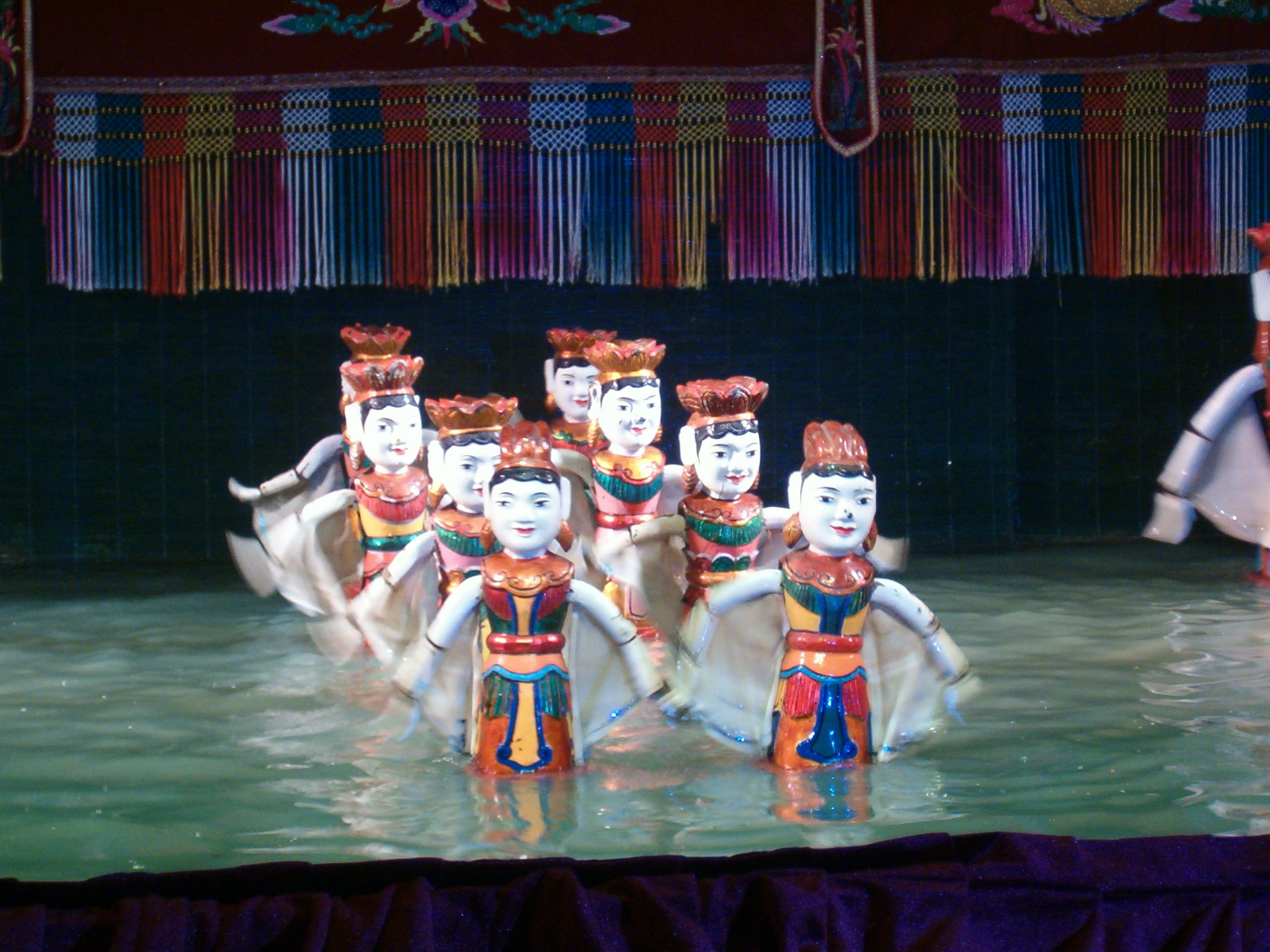
Dance of the water tiên

Water puppetry performance, 2018

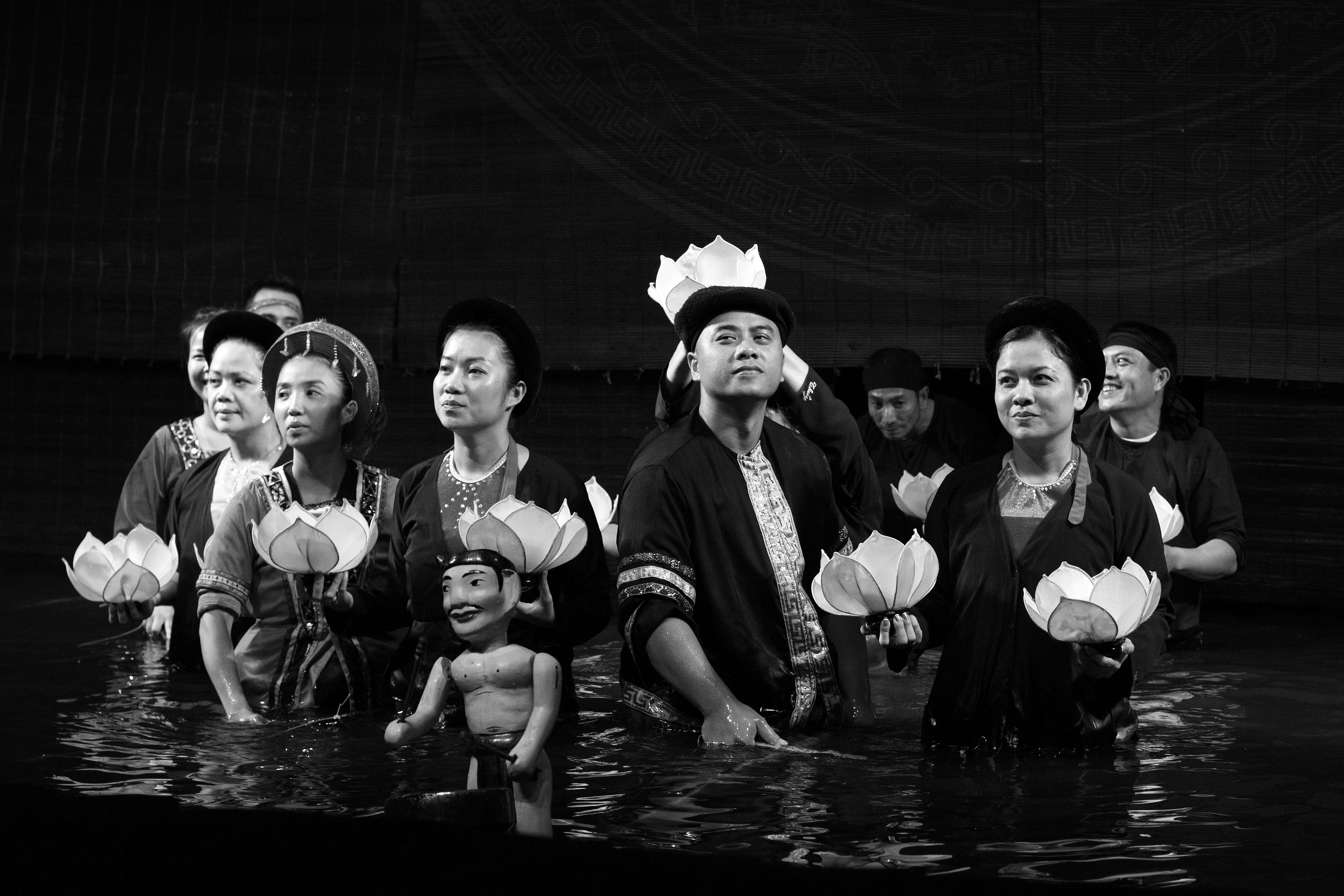
A water puppet theater show in Hanoi, Vietnam. The players present themselves at the end of the show.

Modern water puppetry is performed in a pool of water four meters square, with the water surface being the stage. Performance today occurs in one of three settings—on traditional ponds in villages, where a staging area has been set up; on portable tanks built for traveling performers; or in a specialized building where a pool stage has been constructed.

Up to eight puppeteers stand behind a split-bamboo screen, decorated to resemble a temple facade, and control the puppets using long bamboo rods and string mechanism hidden beneath the water surface. The puppets are carved out of wood and often weigh up to 15 kg (33 lb).

Rice, the main staple of the Vietnamese diet, is usually grown in paddy fields. The original water puppet festivals were literally held inside a rice paddy, with a pagoda built on top to hide the puppeteers who stand in the waist-deep water. The water acts as the stage for the puppets and as a symbolic link to the rice harvest. It also hides the puppet strings and puppeteer movements, improves the musical and vocal acoustics, and provides a shimmering lighting effect.

A traditional Vietnamese orchestra provides background music accompaniment. The instrumentation includes vocals, drums, wooden bells, cymbals, horns, đàn bầu (monochord), gongs, and bamboo flutes. The bamboo flute's clear, simple notes may accompany royalty, while the drums and cymbals may loudly announce a fire-breathing dragon's entrance.

Singers of chèo (a form of opera originating in northern Vietnam) sing songs that tell the story being acted out by the puppets. The musicians and the puppets interact during the performance; the musicians may yell a word of warning to a puppet in danger or a word of encouragement to one in need.

The puppets enter from either side of the stage or emerge from the murky depths of the water.

Spotlights and colorful flags adorn the stage and create a festive atmosphere.

== Content ==
The theme of the skits is rural and has a strong reference to Vietnamese folklore. It tells of day-to-day living in rural Vietnam and Vietnamese folk tales that are told by grandparents to their grandchildren. Stories of the harvest, of fishing, and of festivals are highlighted.

Legends and national history are also told through short skits. Many of the skits, especially those involving the tales of day-to-day living, often have a humorous twist.

== Tễu ==
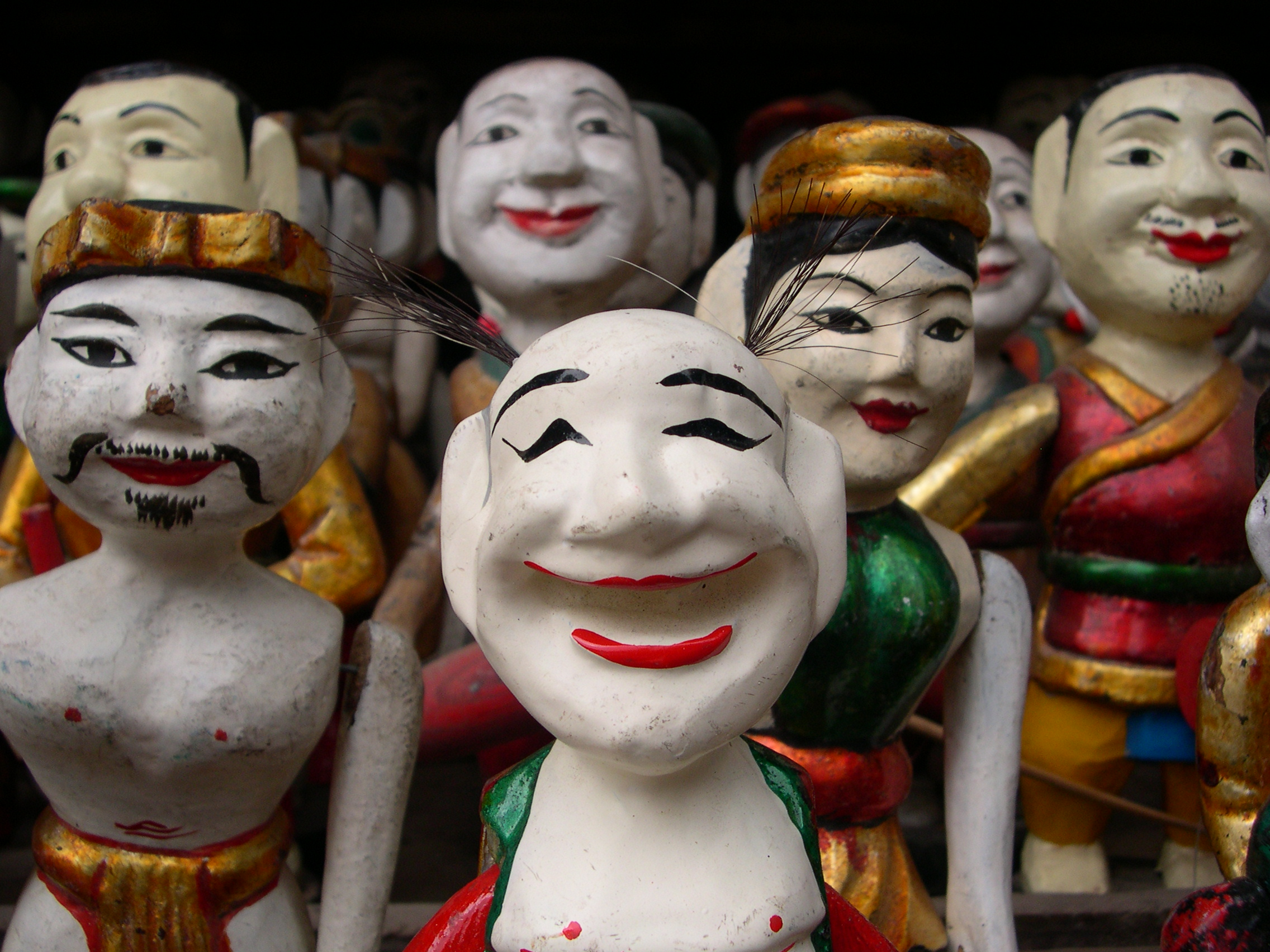
Teu, with his familiar "peach-buns" hair (tóc trái đào, or zongjiao in Chinese

Chú Tễu (chú means uncle, man, boy, or Mr. in Vietnamese) is a recurrent and the most notable character in water puppetry. Tễu means "laugh" in ancient Vietnamese. He is a jester who provides witty comments on political and social topics, especially officials' corruption. His appearance is of a smiling boy who often wears nothing but a simple loincloth, sometimes accompanied by a simple open vest.

== Gallery ==
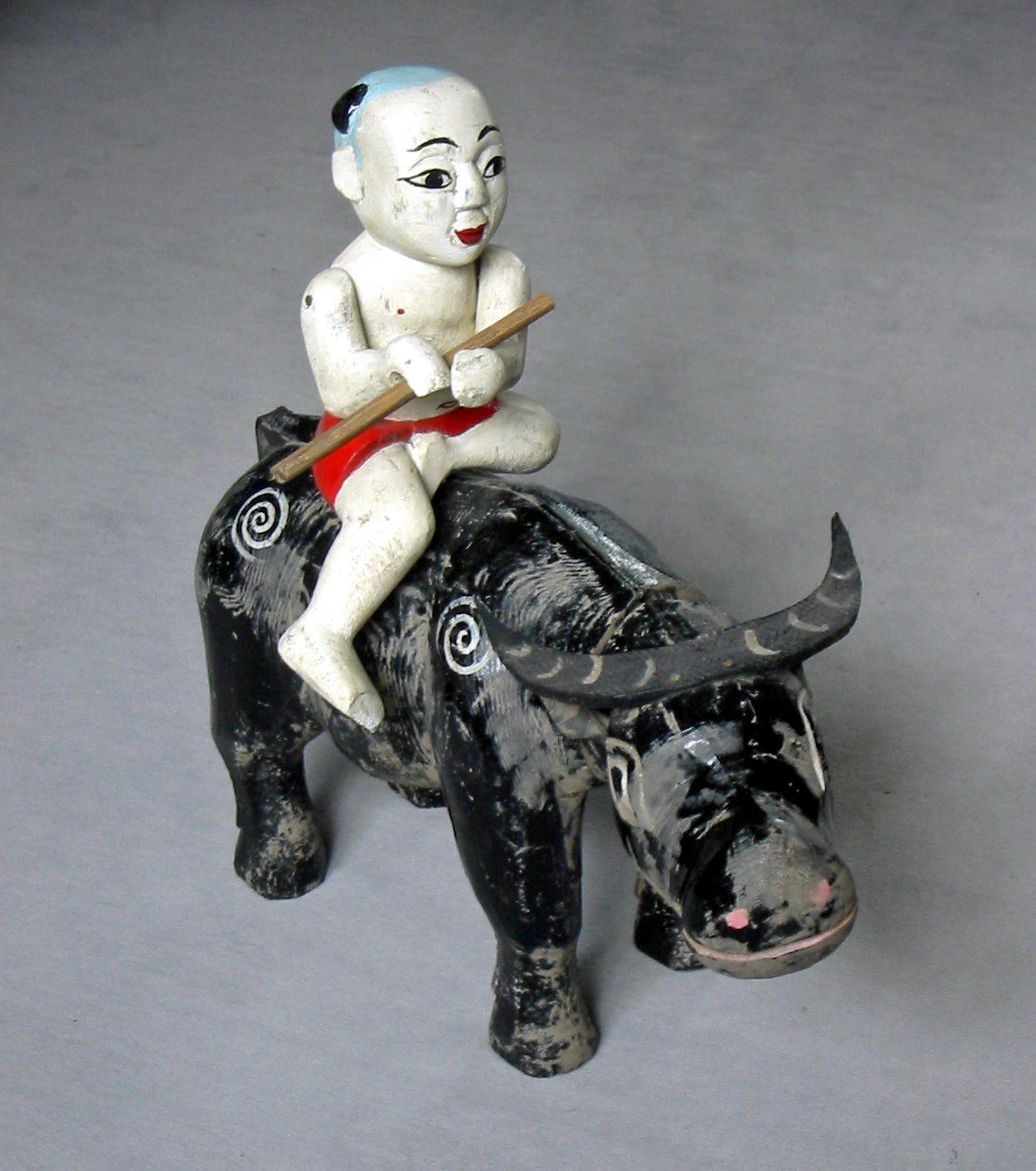
Water puppet representing one of the stages of the Buddhist "ox herder" parable

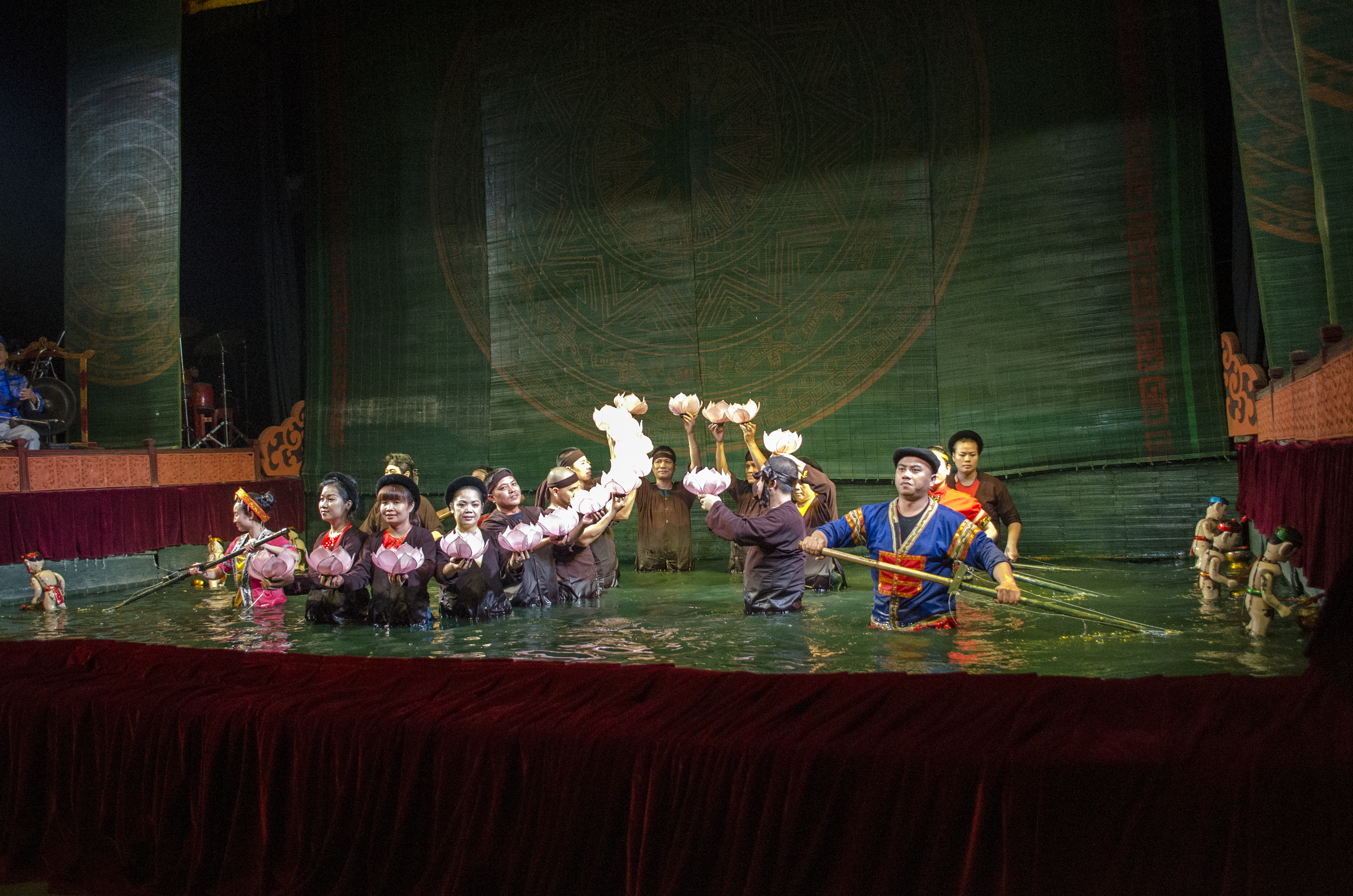
Puppeteers onstage for final act

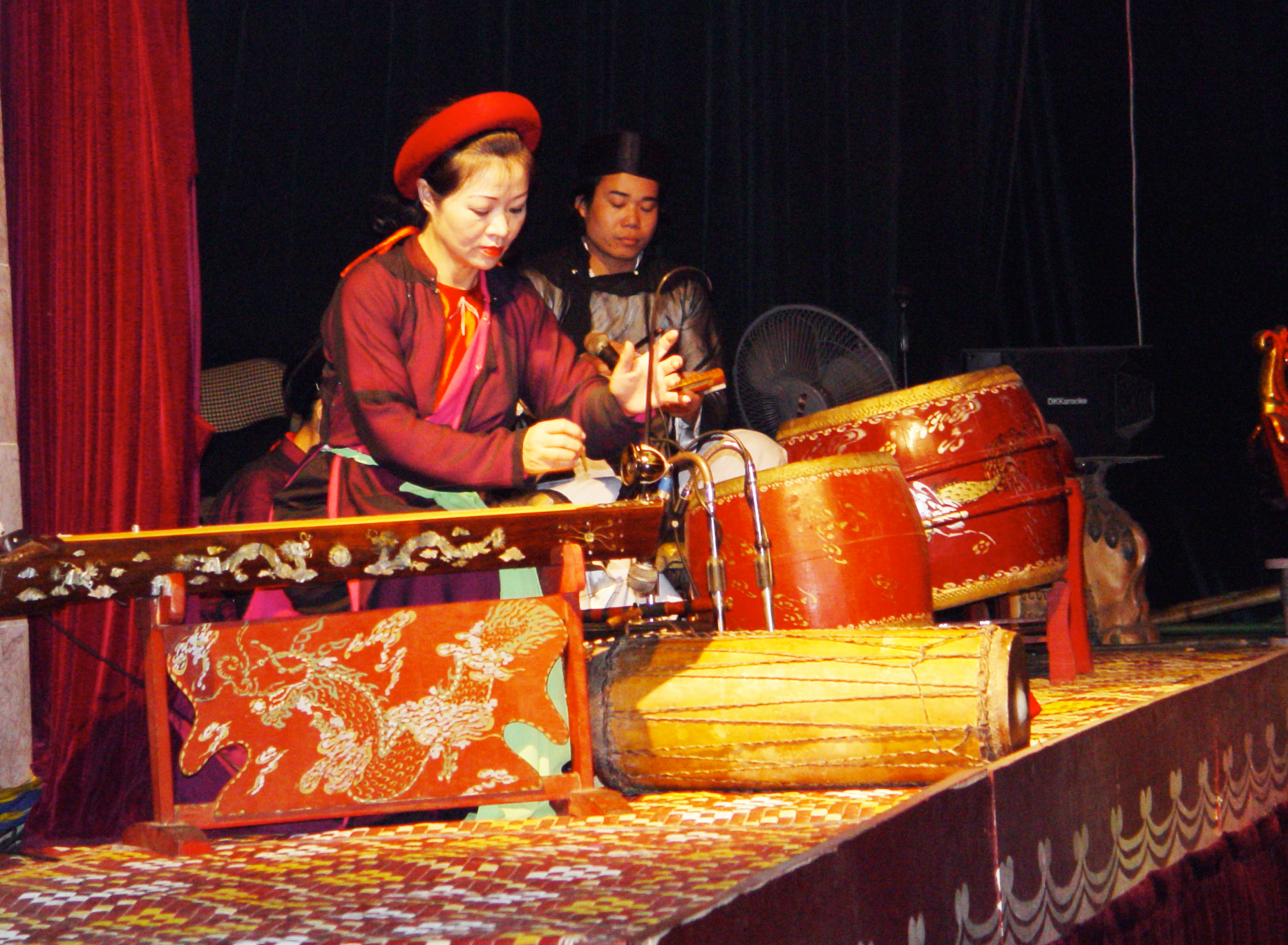
Musician at water puppet show, Hanoi

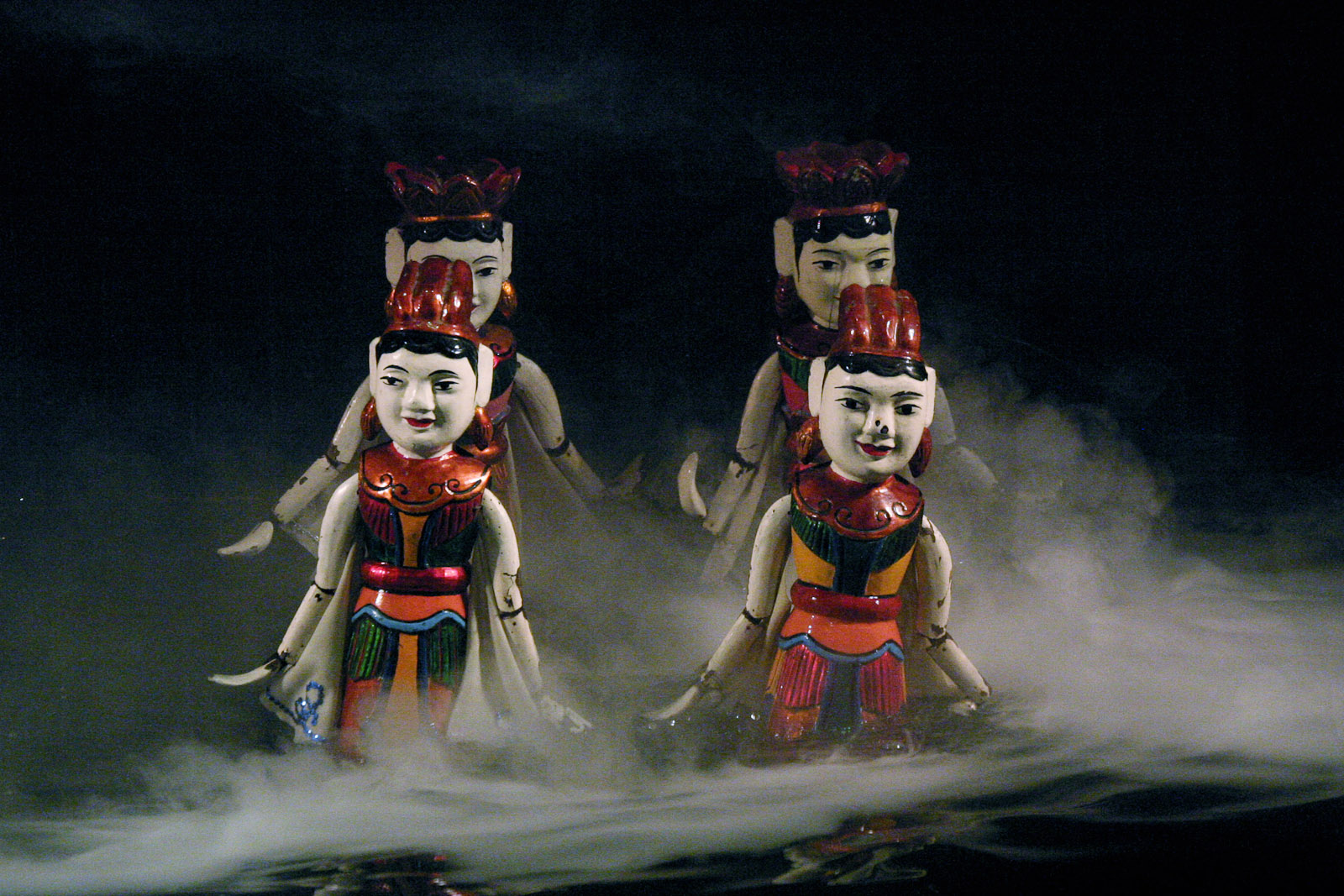
Hanoi water puppets – Tiên dance

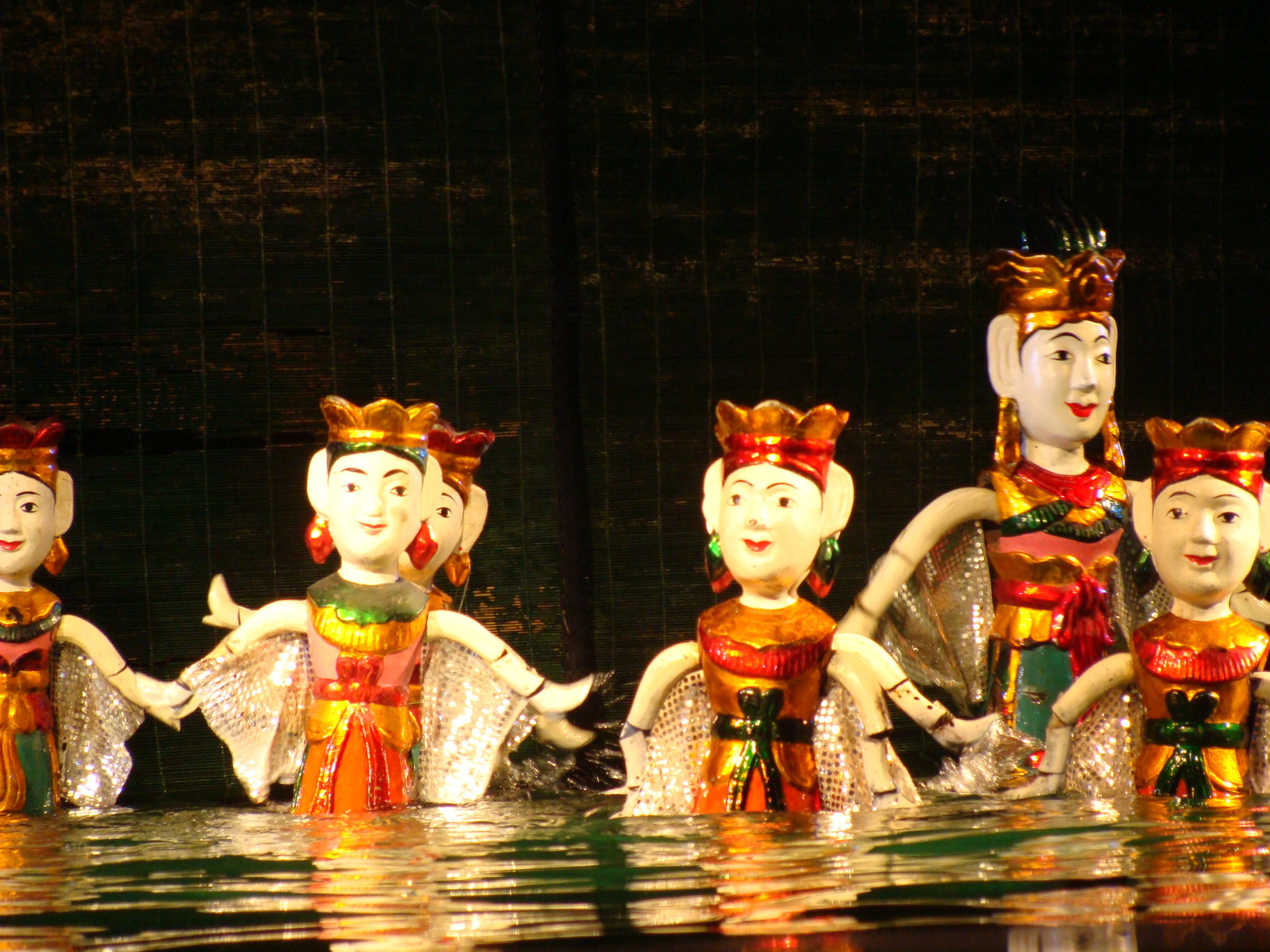
Water puppets

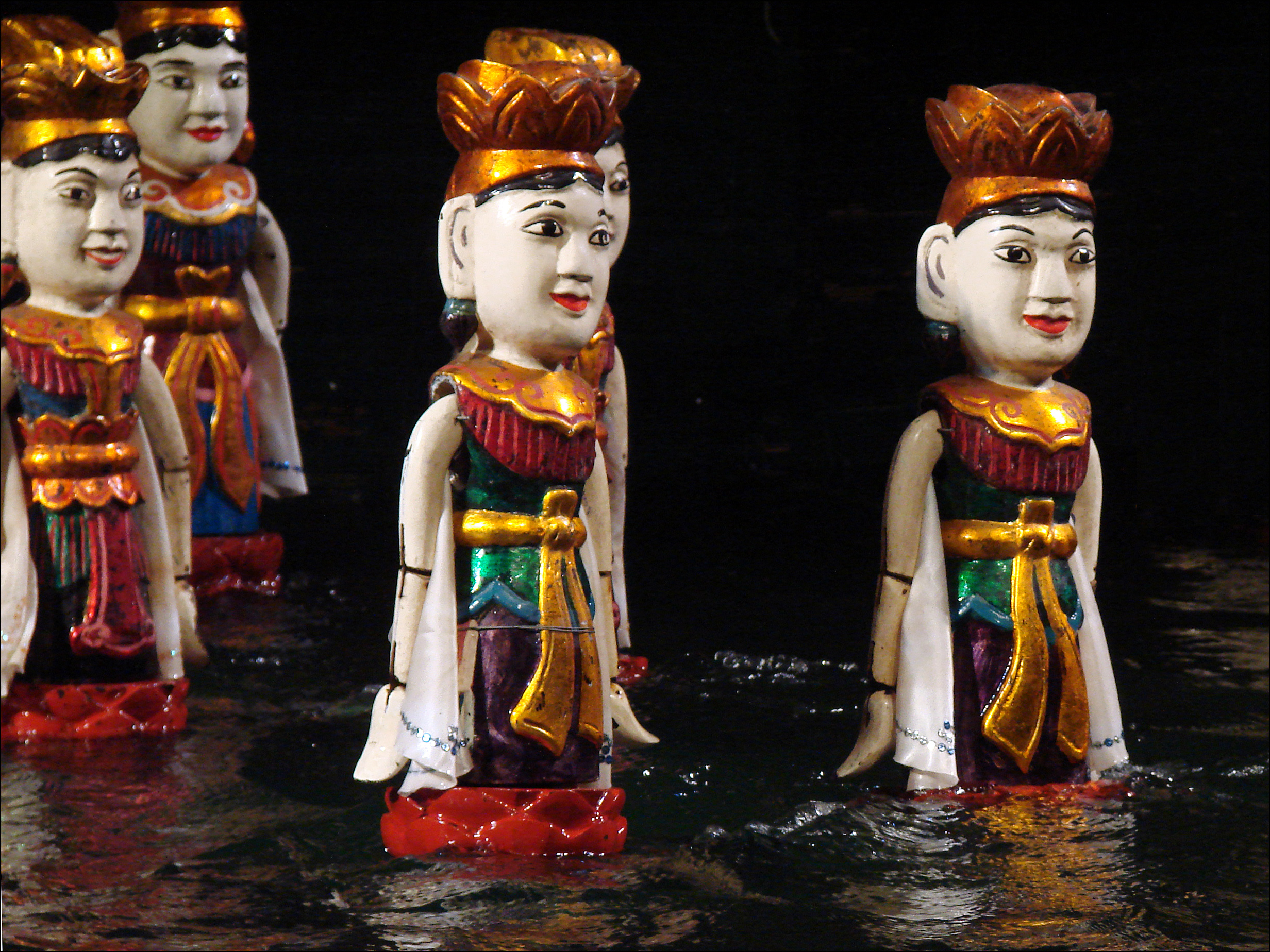
Water puppets at Thang Long Theater

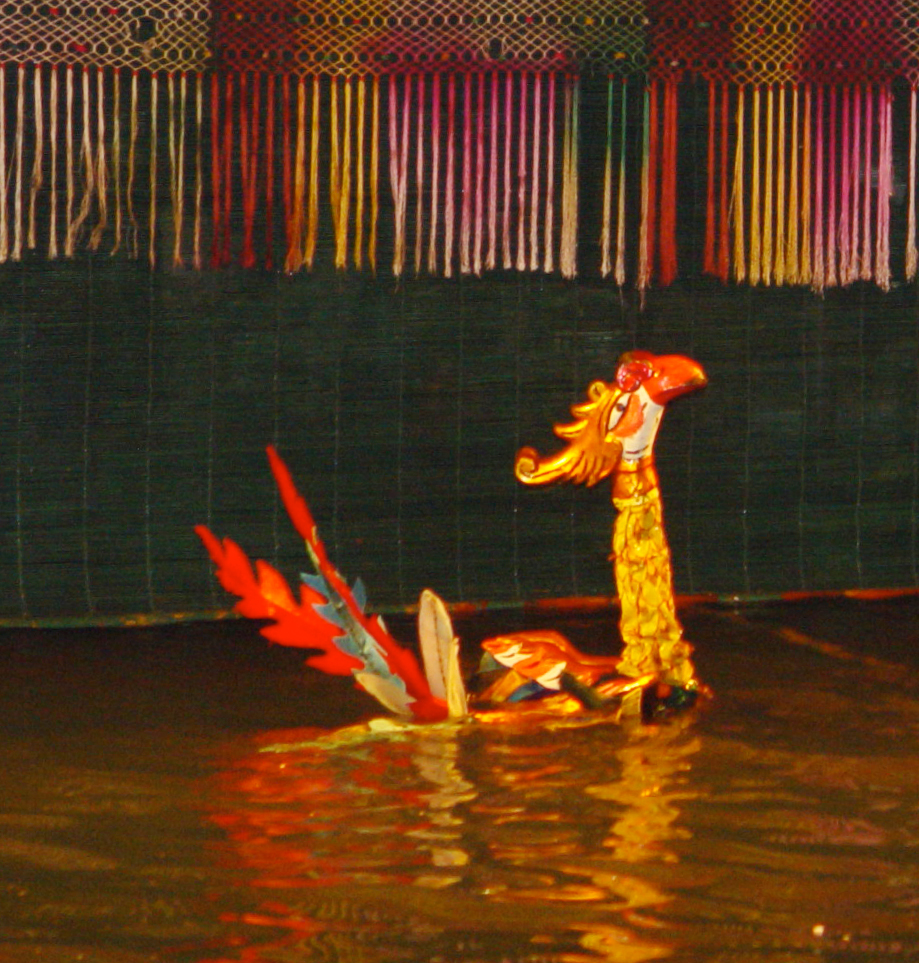
Water puppet

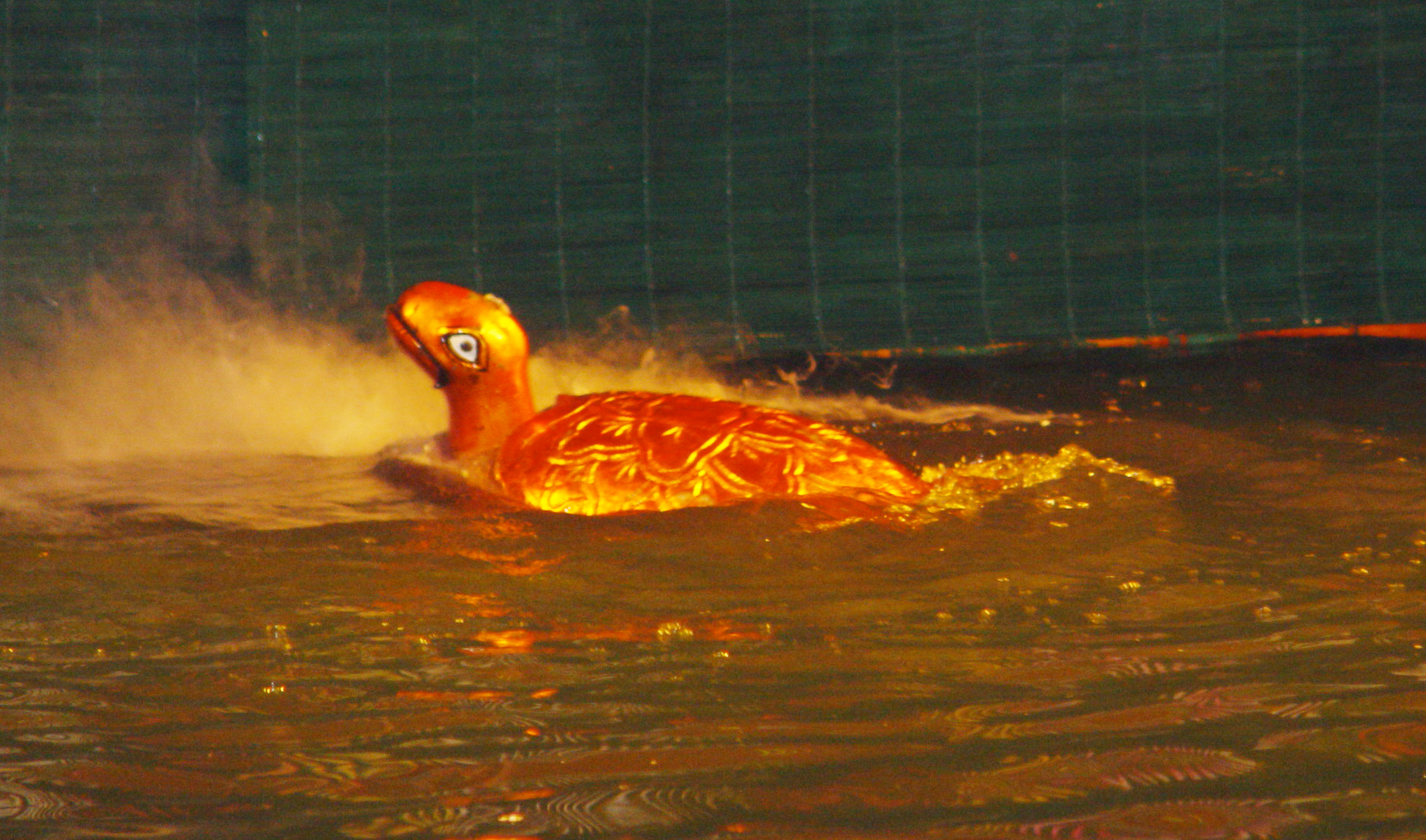
Turtle water puppet

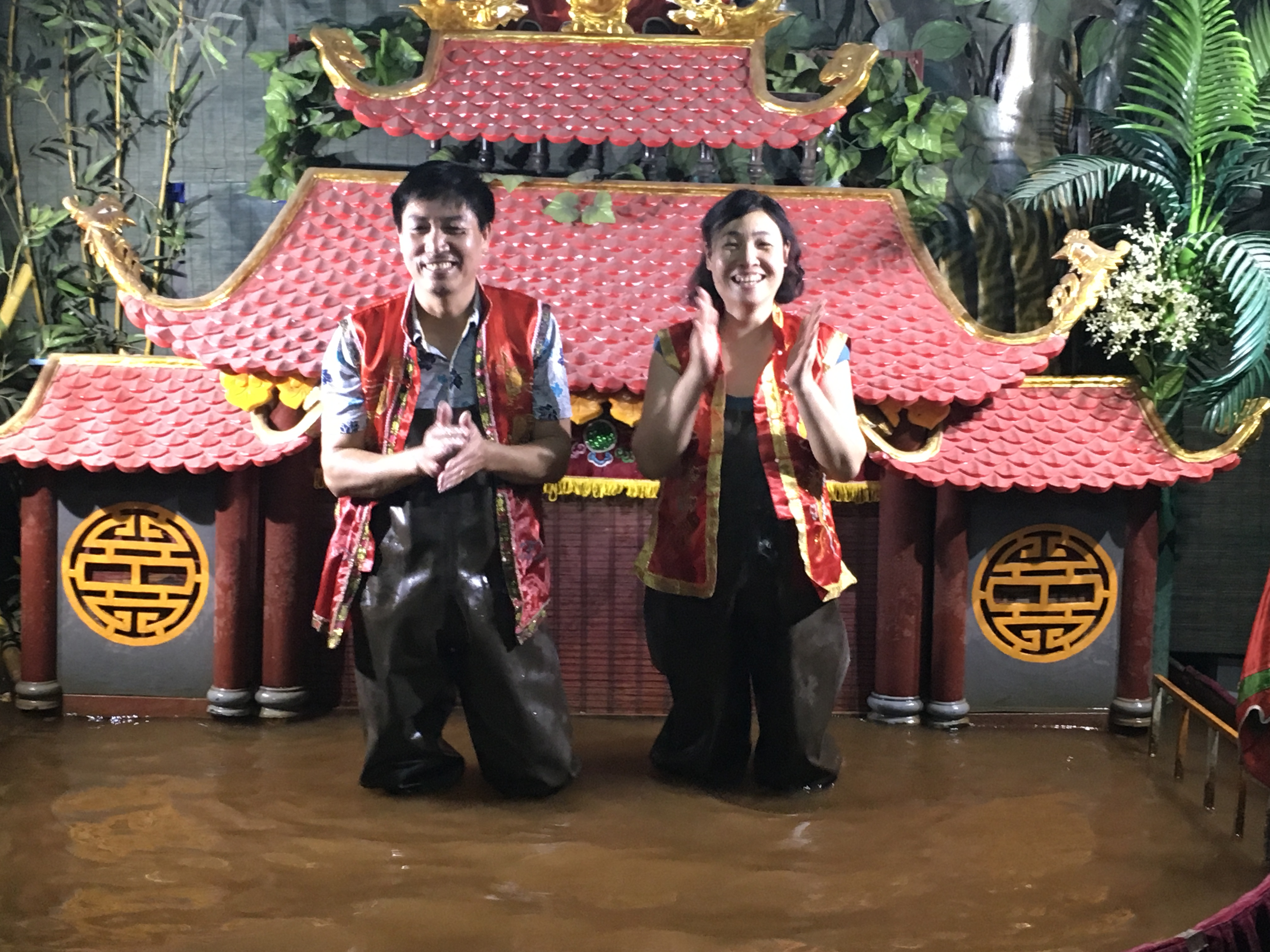
Water puppeteers Phan Tranh Liem and his wife in waders, Hanoi, 2017

== Literature ==
- Nguyễn, Huy Hồng (2006). Vietnamese Traditional Water Puppetry. Hanoi: Thế Giới Publishers. p. 79.
