= Vietnam National Symphony Orchestra =

The Vietnam National Symphony Orchestra (or Việt Nam National Symphony Orchestra; abbreviated VNSO, Vietnamese: Dàn nhạc giao hưởng Việt Nam) is the foremost symphony orchestra in Vietnam. It is based in Hanoi, the nation's capital.

The orchestra's origins date back to 1959, although it was divided by the Vietnam War. It was reorganized in 1984 by the Ministry of Culture and Information. The orchestra performs 60 concerts per year. In addition to performing in Vietnam, it has performed in China, Laos, Thailand, and Japan. In addition to works from the standard orchestral repertoire, it also performs works by Vietnamese composers.

== Staff ==
Graham Sutcliffe, a long term UK resident in Vietnam, is the orchestra's Resident Conductor, Colin Metters serves as Guest Conductor, and Tetsuji Honna is Music Advisor and Principal Conductor. Orchestra members are primarily drawn from the Hanoi Conservatory, though Ho Chi Minh City also has a conservatory teaching western music.

== Collaboration ==
The orchestra works with the Hanoi Opera House (VNOB), and the amateur Hanoi Philharmonic Orchestra (Dàn nhạc giao hưởng Hà Nội) of the Hanoi Conservatory (Học viên Âm nhạc Quốc gia). For some compositions merging western and traditional instruments it may draw on members from either the Traditional Orchestra of the Vietnam Conservatory of Music or the Traditional Orchestra of the Vietnam National Music Theatre.

== Discography ==
- Japan Live 2018 - Trọng Bằng: Symphonic Poem 'Người về đem tới ngày vui (Someone Who Brought Happiness to Us)' / Se Chỉ Luồn Kim (Spinning Song) (Vietnamese folk song from Bắc Ninh Province. arranged by Trần Mạnh Hùng) / Antonín Dvořák: Symphony No. 9, conducted by Tetsuji Honna. Exton CD 2018
