= Quý Dương =

NSND Phạm Quý Dương (Hải Dương, 1937 - 28 June 2011 at Hanoi) was a Vietnamese classical singer, and vocal coach at the Vietnam National Academy of Music. He was selected by Russian voice coaches as the singer to sing the lead baritone role in Tchaikovsky's Eugene Onegin at the Hanoi Opera in 1960, thus becoming Vietnam's first opera singer. He completed his training with Belcanto arias, some of which had been retained in the opera's repertoire from the French colonial period. In later years, together with NSND Trần Hiếu and NSƯT Trung Kiên, Quý Dương was counted as one of those affectionately known as the "3C Trio" (Vietnamese Tam ca 3C, from tam ca 3 “cụ”, old) - a term loosely modelled on Europe's Three Tenors, though the three did not perform as a trio.
