= Phạm Thị Huệ =

Vietnamese folk musician

- Born: August 31, 1973 (age 53); Quảng Ninh Province
- Origin: Vietnam
- Education: Hanoi Conservatory of Music
- Genres: Ca trù, contemporary classical music
- Occupations: Ca trù singer, đàn đáy and đàn tỳ bà player, composer
- Instruments: Đàn bầu, đàn đáy, đàn tỳ bà
- Years active: 1998–present
- Website: Ca trù Thang Long Club

Phạm Thị Huệ (born 31 August 1973, in Cẩm Phả Town, Quảng Ninh Province) is a Vietnamese đàn bầu, đàn đáy, and đàn tỳ bà player, singer, composer and educator. She is the founder and owner of the Thăng Long Ca trù Theater in the Hanoi historic district and has become a leading exponent in the revival of ca trù singing throughout Vietnam.

== Career ==
Following her graduation from the Hanoi Conservatory of Music, Huệ stayed on as a lecturer and instructor of the đàn tỳ bà in the traditional music department. In 1998 Huệ founded the Bac Ha band, while continuing a distinguished career as a traditional music soloist. In 2001, Huệ was selected to represent Vietnam in several cultural exchange programs, including a traditional music festival in Thailand and a cultural exchange program between the Malmö Academy of Music and the Vietnam National Academy of Music.

In addition to her teaching responsibilities, Huệ continued her studies of Vietnamese traditional music including nhã nhạc (refined court music from the royal city of Huế) and chầu văn (a genre of mediumship trance song) under the guidance of Kim Sinh and most significantly, studies in the art of ca trù performance with masters Nguyễn Thị Chúc and Nguyễn Phú Đẹ. Hue progressed rapidly in her studies and, in June 2006, she was initiated into the ca trù guild following her dedication in the "Mở xiêm y" ceremony (a traditional rite announcing the true beginning of a young songstress's occupation).

In August 2006, Huệ and her mentors established the Ca trù Thang Long Club in Hanoi. From 2006 to 2009, Huệ devoted most of her time to developing programs and curricula for the club and completing her Master's thesis, "The Đàn tỳ bà in Modern Vietnamese Society" (2007, unpublished) under Professor Trần Văn Khê. Following the completion of her Master's coursework, Huệ once again began participating in national and international arts and music festivals, including the first Cracking Bamboo Percussion Festival, performances in Australia and Korea, and being awarded the gold medal in October 2009 in Vietnam's National Festival of Ca trù, the same year that UNESCO added ca trù to the Urgent Safeguarding List of the Intangible Cultural Heritage of Humanity.

In 2011, Huệ released her first CD, Ca trù Singing House featuring Huệ on vocals accompanied by Master Nguyễn Phú Đẹ on the đàn đáy.

In addition to her activities as a teacher, performer, and managing director of the Ca trù Thang Long Club, Huệ has written numerous articles including "Oral Transmission" (2005), "The Vietnamese Đàn tỳ bà and the Korean Bipa" (2005), "A Proposal for Teaching Traditional Vietnamese Musical Instruments in Schools" (2012), "Locating Traditional Musical Instruments and Theater Arts in Contemporary Society" (2012), and "Developing and Popularizing Traditional Musical Heritage for International Tourists" (2012).

=== Ca trù Thang Long Club ===
With the creation of the Ca trù Thang Long Club (located at 87 Ma May, Hoàn Kiếm, in Hanoi's historic district), Huệ was able to develop a platform dedicated to the preservation and presentation of ca trù in an authentic setting. In addition to offering performances three times a week, Huệ has recruited a number of young acolytes to continue the tradition of ca trù. Her work with the younger generation has earned her widespread recognition from her peers, including ethnomusicologist Bui Trong Hien, folk arts expert To Ngoc Thanh Thanh, Trần Văn Khê and UNESCO.

== Compositions ==
1. "Ảo vọng" (Illusion) – for tỳ bà and string quartet (1996)
2. "Đường về quê mẹ" (The way back to mother's homeland) – for tỳ bà and percussion (1997)
3. "Thục nữ du xuân I" (Virtuous woman enjoys the spring I) – for tỳ bà and percussion (1997)
4. "Kỷ niệm mùa thu" (Commemoration of Spring) – for tỳ bà and wind instruments (2002) – (premiered in Sweden)
5. "Hạt nắng" (Drop of sunshine) – tỳ bà solo (2005)
6. "Thục nữ du xuân II" (Virtuous woman enjoys the spring II) – đàn đáy and phách woodblocks (2007)
7. "Khúc ca trù Thăng Long" (Thang Long festival song) – voice and traditional instrumental ensemble (2008)
8. "Kiều khúc" (Pretty song) – đàn đáy and voice (2012)

Hue has also composed many folk songs and written original music for use by her students.
