= Beilun River =

River in People's Republic of China and in Vietnam

Coordinates: 21°31′59″N 107°57′0″E

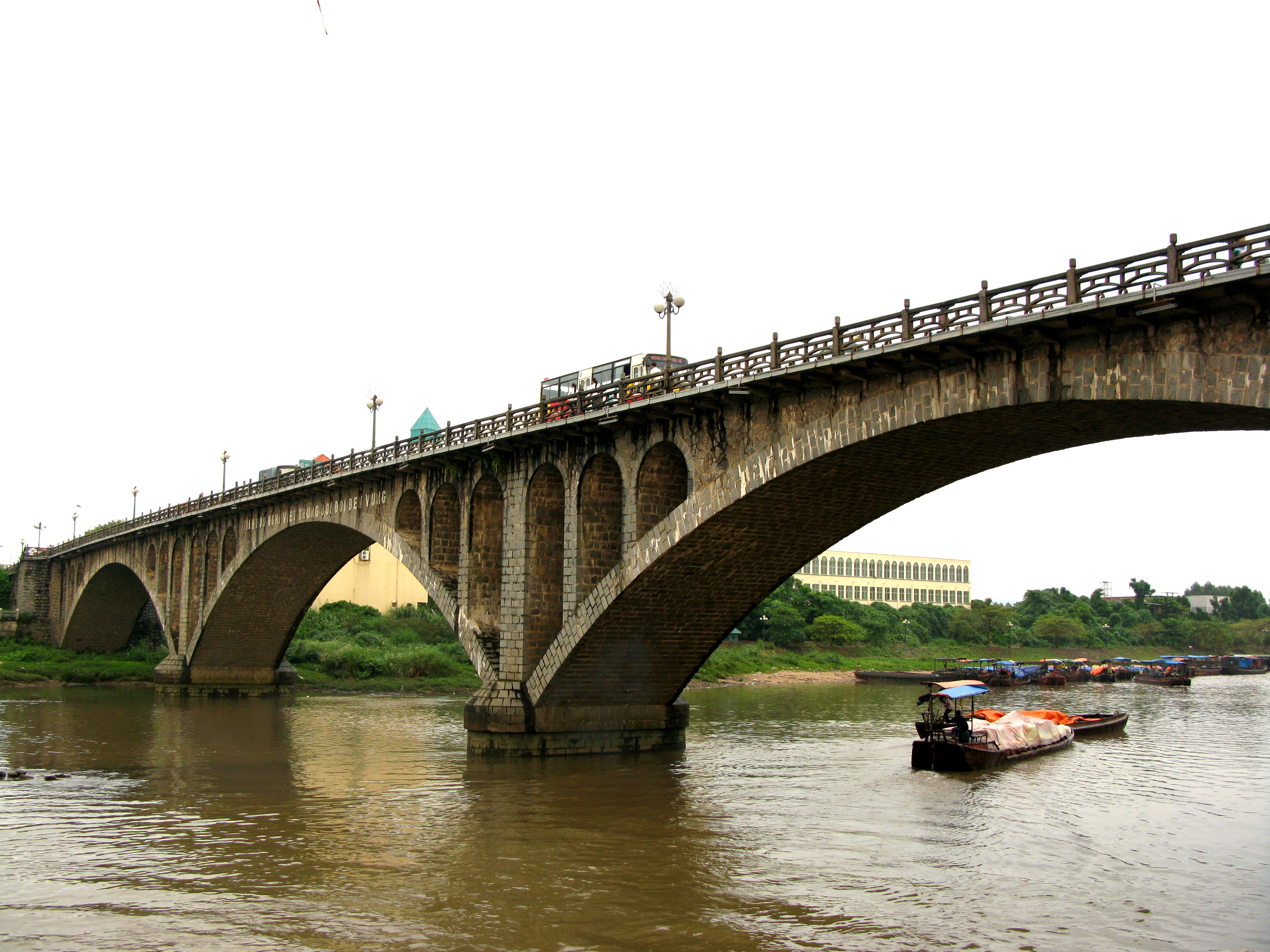
Ka Long river across through Móng Cái, Quảng Ninh Province, Việt Nam

Beilun River (Chinese: 北仑河; pinyin: Běilún hé), or Ka Long River (Vietnamese: sông Ka Long), Bắc Luân River (sông Bắc Luân) is a river on the boundary of the China-Vietnam border.

== Geography ==
This river originates from the Shiwan Mountain within Fangcheng, extending southeast and flowing into the Gulf of Tonkin between Dongxing in China and Mong Cai in Vietnam.

== History ==
Dongxing was a key node of the Maritime Silk Road during the Han and Tang dynasties. Ships frequently traveled back and forth, facilitating the flow of goods.

In 1885, China was defeated in the Sino-French War. Vietnam became a French colony as Li Hongzhang signed the Treaty of Tianjin, delineating the border between China and Vietnam, marking the end of China's status as Vietnam's suzerain. Thus the Beilun River became the official border between the two countries since then.

In 1900, the Beilun River International Iron Bridge was completed, further strengthening border trade. The old iron bridge no longer exists today and was replaced by Beilun River First and Second Bridges.

Within the China-Vietnam Friendship Park by the Beilun River, two friendship trees were planted with seeds gifted by Vietnamese President Ho Chi Minh during his visit to Dongxing in 1960.
