= Chú Tễu =

Puppet in Vietnamese water puppetry

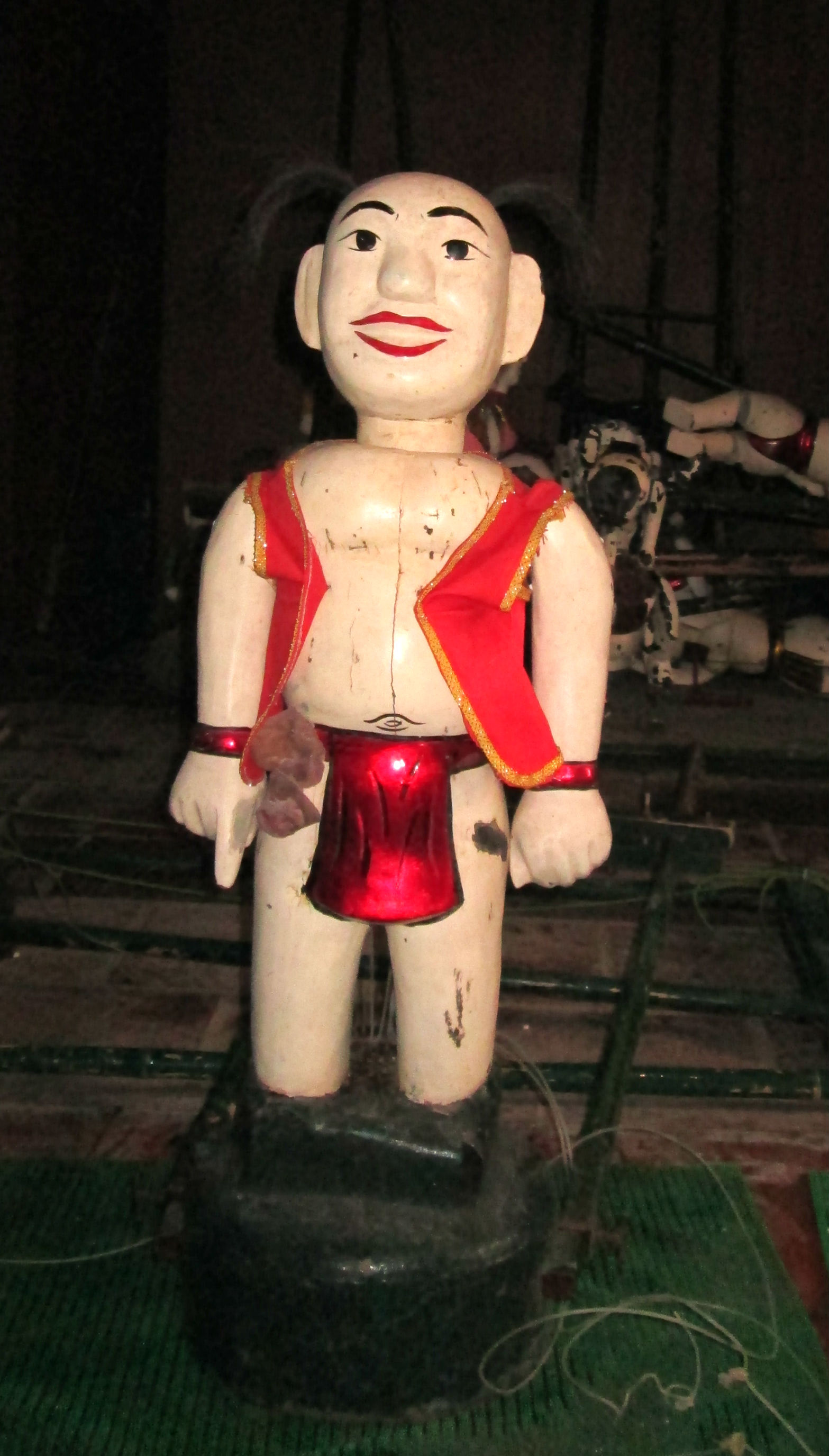
Chú Tễu

Chú Tễu (literally uncle comedian, buffoon, joker) is a typical puppet in Vietnamese water puppetry. Tễu is bigger than other puppets. This character usually introduces the performance and makes humorous actions for the audience.
