= Dongxing, Guangxi =

Dongxing 东兴市 (Chinese) Dunghhingh Si (Zhuang) Thị xã Đông Hưng (Vietnamese) Tunghing
- County-level city
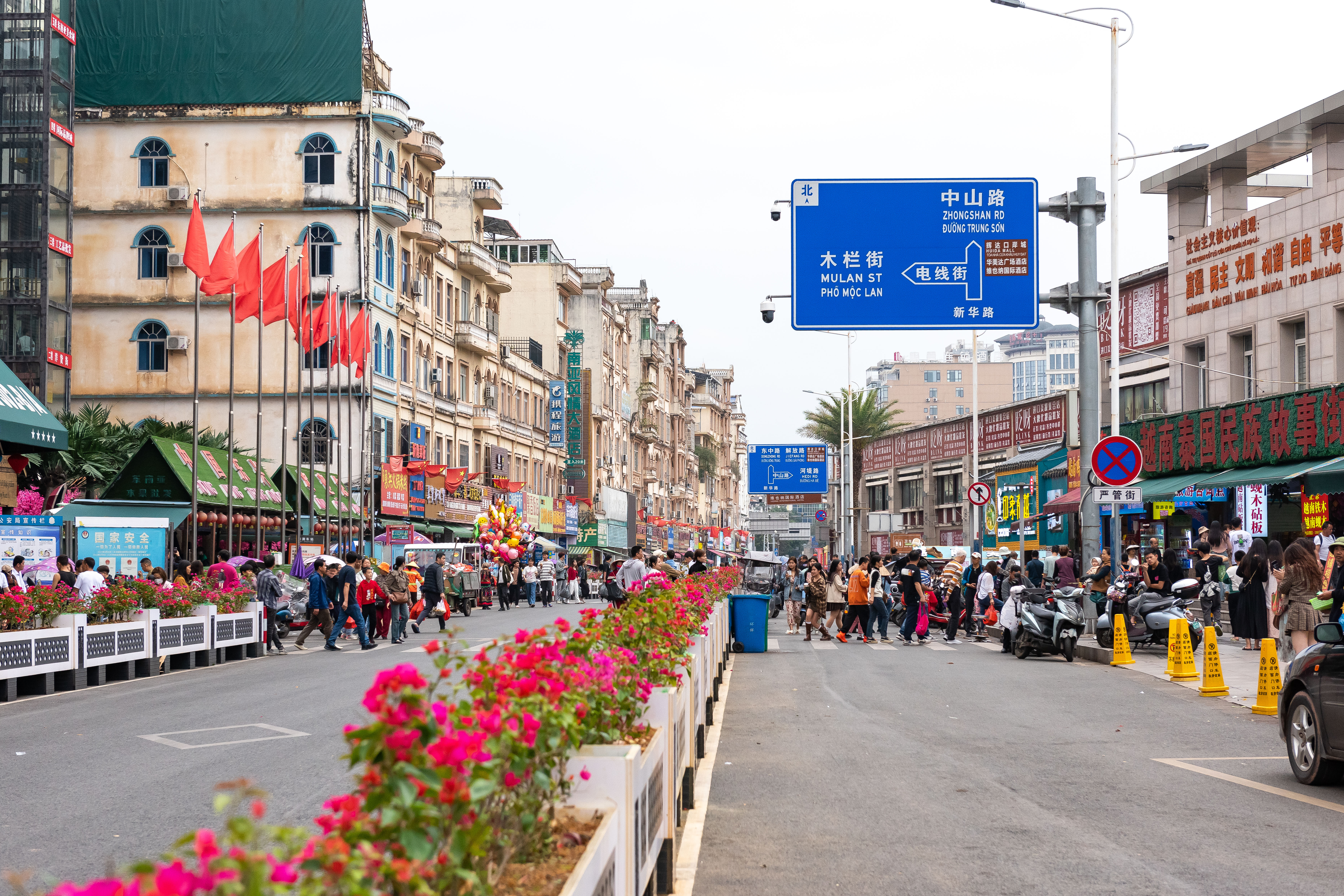
- Xinhua Road in Dongxing

- Location in Guangxi Dongxing (China)
- Coordinates (Dongxing government): 21°32′52″N 107°58′18″E
- Country: China
- Region: Guangxi
- Prefecture-level city: Fangchenggang
- Municipal seat: Dongxing Town (东兴镇)

Area
  - Total: 549 km^{2} (212 sq mi)
- Elevation: 12 m (39 ft)

Population (2011)
  - Total: 130,000
  - Density: 240/km^{2} (610/sq mi)
- Time zone: UTC+8 (China Standard)
- Postal code: 538100
- Area code: 0770

Dongxing, Guangxi

Chinese name
- Simplified Chinese: 东兴市
- Traditional Chinese: 東興市
Transcriptions
Standard Mandarin
- Hanyu Pinyin: Dōngxīng Shì
Yue: Cantonese
- Jyutping: dung1 hing3 si5

Vietnamese name
- Vietnamese alphabet: Thị xã Đông Hưng
- Chữ Hán: 市社東興

Zhuang name
- Zhuang: Dunghhingh Si
- 1957 orthography: Duŋƅhiŋƅ Si

Dongxing (Chinese: 东兴; pinyin: Dōngxīng; lit. 'eastern rise') is a county-level city within Fangchenggang, Guangxi, China, on the border with Móng Cái, Vietnam. The city spans an area of 549 square kilometers, and has a population of approximately 130,000 as of 2011.

== History ==
During 1533–1592, the land south of the Shiwandashan Mountains was ceded to China by the Vietnamese. Jiangping was a melting pot of Vietnamese and Chinese, however, the region was neglected by the Vietnamese government. During the 18th and 19th, the area became a hotbed of piracy (see: Pirates of the South China Coast). In 1885, Jiangping, Bailong Peninsula, and the Jing Islands were ceded by the French to China. The Jing Islands are home to the Gin people, a group of ethnic Vietnamese in China.

The area was later administered as Fangcheng County (防城县; 防城縣). Dongxing was briefly established as a city in 1950 but was merged back into Fangcheng County by 1952. On December 25, 1978, Fangcheng County was re-designated as Fangcheng Various Nationalities Autonomous County (防城各族自治县).

On May 23, 1993, Fangcheng Various Nationalities Autonomous County was abolished, as the prefecture-level city of Fangchenggang was created. With this, the county-level division of Dongxing Economic Development Zone (东兴经济开发区) was established.

On April 29, 1996, the Dongxing Economic Development Zone was abolished, and the county-level city of Dongxing was established. Dongxing was granted authority over the towns of Dongxing, Jiangping, and Malu.

=== Refugees from Vietnam ===
In the summer of 1978, the Friendship Bridge that connected Dongxing and Mong Cai in Vietnam became a makeshift refugee camp for thousands of ethnic Chinese fleeing Vietnam. Ethnic Chinese had lived in Northern Vietnam for decades under Communist rule, but after the North and South unified in April 1975, the Communist government saw the Chinese in the South, many of whom were receiving political and financial aid by Beijing following the Vietnam War, and were a threat to the aspirations of the FNL who began persecuting the Chinese, forcing many to flee by boat. They became part of the known boat people. This caused an exodus of over 250,000 Chinese from Vietnam to China, mainly to Dongxing.

== Geography ==
Dongxing is located in the very south of Guangxi, on the northwest shores of the Gulf of Tonkin. The Beilun River marks the southwest border of Dongxing, with Vietnam on the other side of the river. The terrain is largely hilly.

== Climate ==
Dongxing has a monsoon-influenced humid subtropical climate (Köppen Cwa), with mild to warm winters and long, hot (but not especially) summers, and very humid conditions year-round. The monthly 24-hour average temperature ranges from 15.1 °C (59.2 °F) in January to 28.0 °C (82.4 °F) in July, while extremes have ranged from 3.3 to 37.1 °C (38 to 99 °F). Rain is both the heaviest and most frequent from June to September when 70% of the annual rainfall also occurs. This is in contrast to the autumn and winter months, where only 30 to 50 millimetres (1.2 to 2.0 in) of rain falls per month.

Climate data for Dongxing, elevation 57 m (187 ft), (1991–2020 normals, extremes 1951–2000)
| Month | Jan | Feb | Mar | Apr | May | Jun | Jul | Aug | Sep | Oct | Nov | Dec | Year |
|---|---|---|---|---|---|---|---|---|---|---|---|---|---|
| Record high °C (°F) | 27.2 (81.0) | 29.8 (85.6) | 33.6 (92.5) | 33.1 (91.6) | 35.8 (96.4) | 37.9 (100.2) | 36.5 (97.7) | 38.4 (101.1) | 36.7 (98.1) | 35.0 (95.0) | 32.5 (90.5) | 30.1 (86.2) | 38.4 (101.1) |
| Mean daily maximum °C (°F) | 18.8 (65.8) | 19.9 (67.8) | 22.3 (72.1) | 26.5 (79.7) | 30.0 (86.0) | 31.3 (88.3) | 31.5 (88.7) | 31.8 (89.2) | 31.6 (88.9) | 29.5 (85.1) | 25.8 (78.4) | 21.4 (70.5) | 26.7 (80.0) |
| Daily mean °C (°F) | 15.4 (59.7) | 16.7 (62.1) | 19.5 (67.1) | 23.4 (74.1) | 26.6 (79.9) | 28.2 (82.8) | 28.3 (82.9) | 28.0 (82.4) | 27.4 (81.3) | 25.1 (77.2) | 21.4 (70.5) | 17.3 (63.1) | 23.1 (73.6) |
| Mean daily minimum °C (°F) | 13.1 (55.6) | 14.6 (58.3) | 17.4 (63.3) | 21.2 (70.2) | 24.1 (75.4) | 25.7 (78.3) | 25.7 (78.3) | 25.3 (77.5) | 24.4 (75.9) | 22.0 (71.6) | 18.4 (65.1) | 14.5 (58.1) | 20.5 (69.0) |
| Record low °C (°F) | 0.9 (33.6) | 4.1 (39.4) | 5.0 (41.0) | 11.1 (52.0) | 15.7 (60.3) | 19.5 (67.1) | 21.5 (70.7) | 21.2 (70.2) | 17.3 (63.1) | 10.8 (51.4) | 5.5 (41.9) | 3.3 (37.9) | 0.9 (33.6) |
| Average precipitation mm (inches) | 56.5 (2.22) | 41.9 (1.65) | 68.5 (2.70) | 104.7 (4.12) | 270.9 (10.67) | 487.6 (19.20) | 676.6 (26.64) | 512.1 (20.16) | 274.4 (10.80) | 120.3 (4.74) | 86.7 (3.41) | 39.5 (1.56) | 2,739.7 (107.87) |
| Average precipitation days (≥ 0.1 mm) | 11.3 | 12.1 | 15.8 | 13.3 | 15.6 | 19.5 | 20.9 | 19.1 | 13.0 | 7.9 | 7.8 | 8.4 | 164.7 |
| Average relative humidity (%) | 78 | 82 | 85 | 83 | 82 | 85 | 84 | 83 | 78 | 72 | 72 | 72 | 80 |
| Mean monthly sunshine hours | 63.7 | 51.7 | 44.6 | 83.0 | 140.3 | 138.0 | 164.0 | 175.7 | 181.6 | 183.9 | 143.6 | 108.6 | 1,478.7 |
| Percentage possible sunshine | 19 | 16 | 12 | 22 | 34 | 34 | 40 | 44 | 50 | 51 | 43 | 33 | 33 |
Source 1: China Meteorological Administrationall-time record low
Source 2: Weather China

== Administrative divisions ==
Dongxing administers 3 towns: Dongxing (东兴镇), Jiangping (江平镇), and Malu (马路镇).

== Economy ==
The city is home to various natural resources, including titanium, manganese, quartz, granite, and various crystals.

Major tourist attractions in the city include its beaches, mangrove forests, the Beilun River, and ethnic Vietnamese settlements on the islands of Wutou (Chinese: 巫头岛; Vietnamese: đảo Vu Đầu, chữ Nôm: 島巫頭), Wanwei (Chinese: 万尾岛; Vietnamese: đảo Vạn Vĩ, chữ Nôm: 島万尾), and Shanxin (Chinese: 山心岛; Vietnamese: đảo Sơn Tâm, chữ Nôm: 島山心).

== See also ==
- Gin people
