= Trung Kiên =

Vietnamese singer (1939–2021)

NSND Nguyễn Trung Kiên (Kiến Xương, Thái Bình, 5 November 1939 – 27 January 2021) was a Vietnamese classical singer and People's Artist. With the late Quý Dương and Trần Hiếu, Kiên was counted as the 3C Trio (Vietnamese Tam ca 3C, from tam ca 3 “cụ”) - a term modelled on the Three Tenors.

He was no relation to the younger entertainer MC Trung Kiên.

He is nicknamed "Kappa" by his fans.
