= Nguyễn Thanh Tùng =

Vietnamese monochord music performer

Nguyễn Thanh Tùng (born October 20, 1979) is a Vietnamese monochord music performer and composer. He is well-known not only for his moving monochord performances and compositions, but also for his inner strength and perseverance as a blind Agent Orange victim.

Thanh Tùng has performed Vietnamese traditional music and masterpieces by Brahms, Chopin, etc., in many countries, such as France and Belgium, and received worldwide notice.

== Early life ==
Nguyễn Thanh Tùng was born on October 20, 1979, in Hanoi, Vietnam. Affected by Agent Orange or dioxin inherited from his father, a Vietnam War soldier, Tùng was born with one blind eye. His other eye was very weak. However, since an early age, he has shown his musical talent. In a talent competition for children held in 1986–1987, he earned the Special Award.

When Thanh Tùng turned 12, he became totally blind. Nevertheless, his love for music has never died. He applied to a special two-year music course in the Vietnam National Music Academy. There he proceeded to study Vietnamese traditional music, majoring in Monochord Performance. Despite his illness, in 1997, Nguyen Thanh Tung continued to study Music composition and piano as well.

Thanh Tùng went through much hardship in his years at the Vietnam National Music Academy. He received great support from friends and professors such as Prof. Đặng Xuân Khải, music composer Đỗ Hồng Quân, Prof. Minh Khang, etc. and many philanthropists

== Personal life ==
Nguyễn Thanh Tùng's family plays an important part in his performance and composition career.

Thanh Tùng was born to Nguyen Thanh Son, a Vietnam War veteran and currently a photographer, and Pham Thi Duc Hoa, a tailor.

In 1972, Mr. Son's squad was deployed in Quảng Trị and he got affected by Agent Orange ever since. His two children are inherently affected by the poisonous dioxin. Thanh Tung's older sister, Nguyen Thi Phuong Thuy, is more severely affected than him. She is totally paralyzed, epileptic, blind, deaf and dumb. After the end of the Vietnam War, Mr. Son has been working as a photographer to make ends meet. He is an example of determination and perseverance for his son, Thanh Tung.

Thanh Tùng's mother is a devoted and loving wife and mother. Her love and sacrifice for the family give Thanh Tùng more strength to get over the difficulties and pursue his dream as a musician. The piece "Moon and River" was composed by Thanh Tùng to honor his mother, who has spent her whole life caring for him and his sister. In 2005, she received the Sofia Kovalevskaya Award.

Another important person behind the success of Thanh Tùng is his grandfather, Nguyen Te Do. He brought him up and introduced him to music. Finding his grandson interested in monochord melodies, but not affording a monochord at that time, he made a monochord for Thanh Tùng by himself. Simple as it is, this monochord is a part of Thanh Tùng's childhood and is involved in his entire life and career.

== Career ==
An honor graduate, Thanh Tùng receives many invitations to perform in and outside Vietnam. Particularly, he had the chance to perform in the 2006 APEC Summit held in Hanoi.

In 2005, the organization Vietnam les enfants de la dioxin invited him to perform in France in a campaign for Agent Orange victims.

Thanh Tùng performed in several French cities, including Paris, Marseille, Roan, and then Belgium. He received standing ovations wherever he performed. The French media took notice of him. When he performed in a Christian church, people cried and said, "Thank God for sending you here!"

In Belgium, Thanh Tùng had the honor to perform with Prof. Phi Deli of the Brussels Academy of Music. She let him sit in a higher place, claiming, "I love Vietnam very much. You are a special musician from Vietnam, so I want everyone to see you more clearly and honor your will and determination."

Thanh Tùng usually performs three music genres, viz. Vietnamese folk music, monochord compositions by Vietnamese composers, and classical pieces by Mozart, Brahms, Schubert, and Beethoven transcribed for the monochord.

To date, Nguyễn Thanh Tùng continues to compose music, teach and perform the monochord, and mix music.

Many documentary movies about his life and career have been shot, such as The little Taxaceae (1991), Overcome the Fate (2008), The message of hope and belief (2010) - one series of "The Hanoians", broadcast on the National Television of Vietnam, and so on.

== Works ==
=== Performance ===
Nguyễn Thanh Tùng successfully performs many of Vietnam's noted pieces such as Lullaby from South Vietnam, To the woods, Please stay, etc.

The song "Hanoi's season without rain" transcribed by Nguyễn Thanh Tùng for piano solo, became the theme song of the documentary movie Overcome the Fate about his life and career.

=== Composition ===
"Narrative" (composed for violin) and "Spring's color" (for violin and piano) are some of Nguyễn Thanh Tùng's compositions.

"Moon and River", composed for monochord, zither and percussion, won the Special Award in the Composition Competition held by the Vietnam National Music Academy. The piece was composed after a sleepless painful night of nostalgia. Thanh Tùng recalled his childhood days walking on the riverside with his grandfather in the moonlight. He thought his life was like a river, turning peaceful only after storms.

=== Style ===
Thanh Tùng's monochord performances are purely moving, expressing love and his own difficult life experience. He enjoys improvising and usually improvises traditional melodies. However, he dislikes modern techniques applied to the monochord performance such as using the pedal to move up or down several octaves currently popular with many Vietnamese musicians.

Thanh Tùng usually develops complex melodies in his composition where there is no leading instrument. This can be seen in his composition "Moon and river." In general, Thanh Tùng's works are mixed between pure emotions and philosophy of life. The melodies are clearly contrasted with each other, resembling his struggle in music.
