= Trần Hiếu =

Vietnamese singer

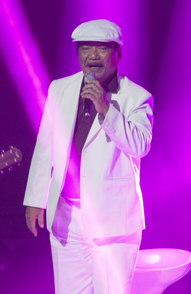
Trần Hiếu in 2012

NSND Trần Hiếu (23 April 1936) is a Vietnamese classical singer. With the late Quý Dương and Trung Kiên, Hiếu was counted as the 3C Trio (Vietnamese Tam ca 3C, from tam ca 3 “cụ”), a term modelled on the Three Tenors.
