= Gin people =

Ethnic group in southeast China

京族 Người Kinh (𠊛京)
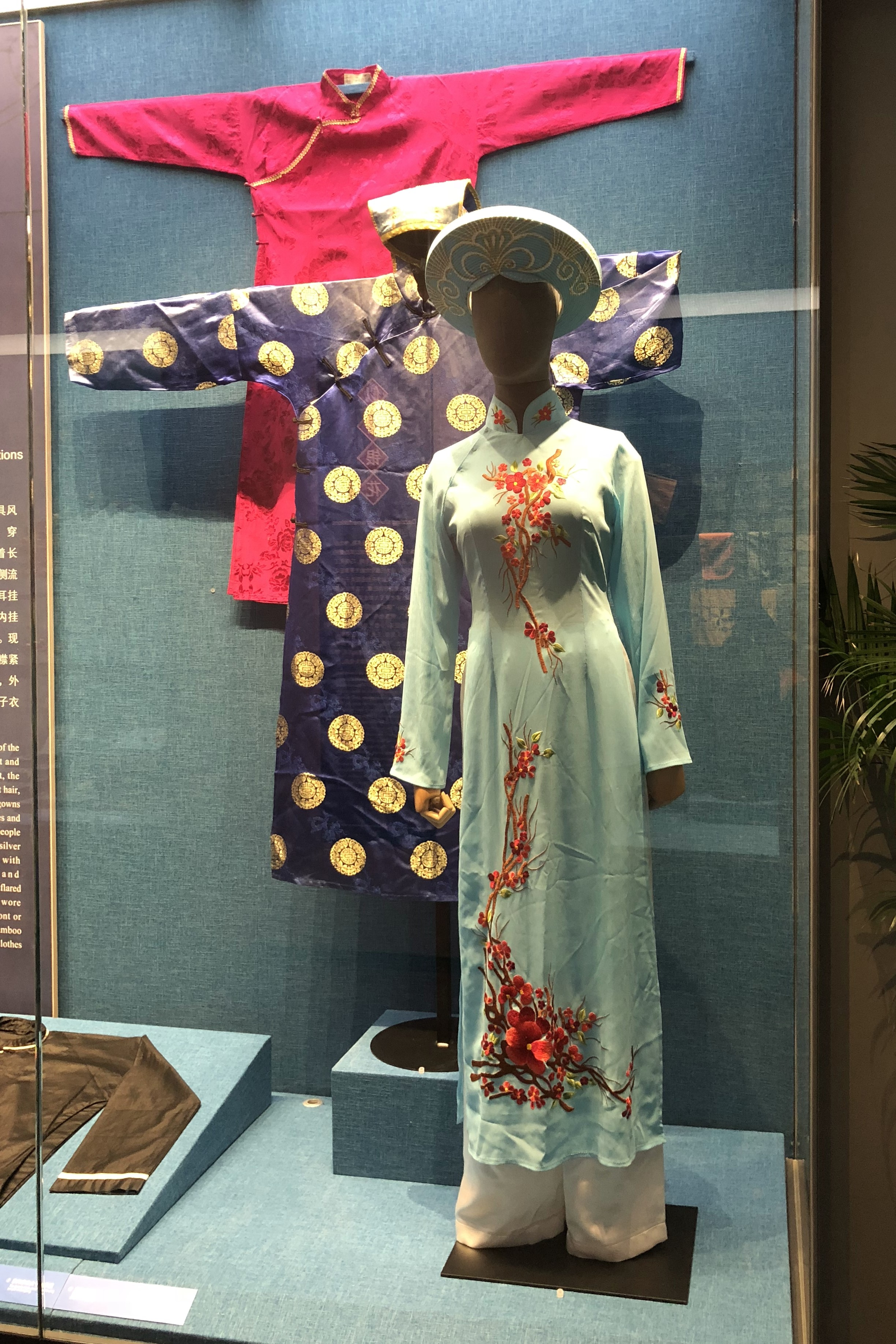

Total population
- 33,112 (2020 census)

Regions with significant populations
- China (Wutou, Wanwei and Shanxin islands off the coast of Dongxing, Guangxi)

Languages
- Mandarin Chinese, Yue Chinese, and Vietnamese

Religion
- Folk religion · Mahayana Buddhism · Taoism · Catholicism

Related ethnic groups
- Viet people, Muong, Chứt, Thổ

Gin people

Chinese name
- Chinese: 京族
Transcriptions
Standard Mandarin
- Hanyu Pinyin: Jīngzú
- Bopomofo: ㄐㄧㄥ ㄗㄨˊ
- Wade–Giles: Ching^{1}-tsu^{2}
- Yale Romanization: Jīngdzú
- IPA: [tɕíŋtsǔ]
Yue: Cantonese
- Yale Romanization: gīng juhk
- Jyutping: ging1 zuk6
- IPA: Cantonese pronunciation: [kɪ́ŋ tsʊ̀k]

Vietnamese name
- Vietnamese alphabet: Kinh tộc Người Kinh tại Trung Quốc
- Chữ Hán: 京族
- Chữ Nôm: 𠊛京在中國

The Gin or Jing people (Chinese: 京族, Sino-Vietnamese: Kinh tộc; Vietnamese: người Kinh tại Trung Quốc, lit. 'Kinh people in China') are a community of descendants of ethnic Viet people living in China. They mainly live in an area called the Jing Islands (京族三岛), off the coast of Dongxing, Fangchenggang, in the Chinese autonomous region of Guangxi. These territories were administered by the Nguyễn dynasty but were later ceded by French Indochina to China due to the 1887 convention and agreement, following the Sino-French War.

The Gin population was 33,112 as of 2020. This number does not include the 36,205 Vietnamese nationals studying or working in Mainland China, recorded by the 2010 national population census.

== Terminology ==
In Vietnamese, Kinh ( chữ Hán: 京) and Việt ( chữ Hán: 越) are used interchangeably to refer Viet people, with Kinh used more in more official contexts. Kinh (京), meaning "capital city", evolved to refer to people living in the lowlands, to distinguish them from people living in the highlands. Việt (越) is a reference to the Baiyue, a collection of non-Han peoples who lived in southern China since ancient times.

The Gin people were first labelled Yue (Chinese: 越族; pinyin: Yuèzú, Sino-Vietnamese: Việt tộc) before the introduction of the name Gin in 1958. This name change was requested because Gin people did not want to be confused with Vietnamese citizens in China, and thus they chose their ethnic name, the Kinh.

== History ==
The ancestors of the Gin people immigrated to the area from Hải Phòng, Vietnam, during the 16th century and established communities on the three originally uninhabited islands of Wutou, Wanwei and Shanxin.

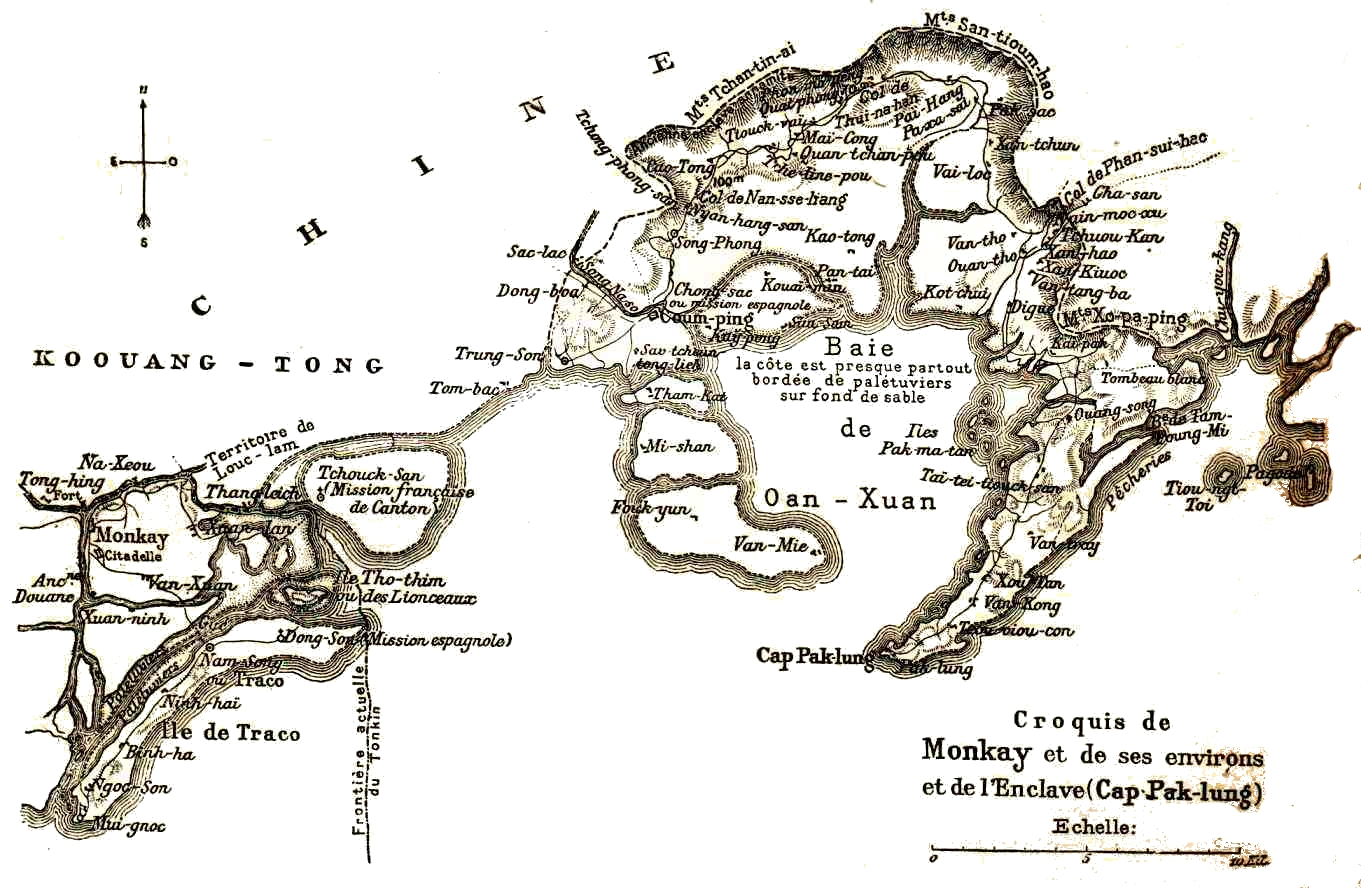
Vietnam's territories in modern-day Fangchenggang on an 1888 map, before ceded to China

Mạc Vietnam ceded the lands south of Shiwandashan Mountains, including the Bailong Peninsula, to the Ming dynasty. Jiangping was a melting pot of Vietnamese and Chinese, however, the region was neglected by the Vietnamese government. During the 18th and 19th centuries, the area became a hotbed of piracy. After the Sino-French War in 1885, Jiangping and the Jing Islands were ceded by the French to Qing China.

== Geography ==
The people of this very small ethnic minority have lived for about 500 years on the three islands of Wanwei (Vạn Vĩ), Wutou (Vu Đầu) and Shanxin (Sơn Tâm) off the coast of Guangxi, China, about 8 km east of the border with Vietnam. Some also live in nearby villages of Zhushan and Tanji. In the 1960s, the islands were connected to the mainland by a land reclamation project. The islands are administered as part of Dongxing county within Fangchenggang prefecture. A minority also live in nearby counties and towns with predominately Han Chinese or Zhuang populations.

The Gin live in a subtropical area with plenty of rainfall and rich mineral resources. The Gulf of Tonkin to its south is an ideal fishing ground. Of the more than 700 species of fish found there, over 200 are of great economic value and high yields. Pearls, sea horses and sea otters which grow in abundance are prized for their medicinal value. Seawater from the Gulf of Tonkin is good for salt making. The main crops there are rice, sweet potato, peanut, taro and millet, and sub-tropical fruits like papaya, banana, and longan are also plentiful. The large tracts of mangroves growing in marshy land along the coast are a rich source of tannin, an essential raw material for the tanning industry.

== Distribution ==
The Census of 2020 recorded 33,112 Gin in China.

Provincial Distribution of the Gin, from the 2020 census

Province-level division	Gin Population	% of China's Gin Population
Guangxi Zhuang Autonomous Region	29,326	88.57%
Guizhou Province	1,506	4.55%
Guangdong Province	545	1.65%
Yunnan Province	418	1.26%
Zhejiang Province	213	0.64%
Jiangxi Province	172	0.52%
Fujian Province	144	0.43%
Hubei Province	91	0.27%
Other	697	2.11%

== Language ==
The Gin language is a dialect of Vietnamese. For writing, the Gin still use chữ Hán and chữ Nôm to write Vietnamese, because they were not affected by the transition to the Vietnamese Latin alphabet by the French colonial government during the French colonial period. Created on the basis of the script of the Han people towards the end of the 13th century, it is found in old song books and religious scriptures.

Standard Cantonese is also spoken by many in the community as well as Mandarin Chinese. A survey in 1980 indicated that one third of Gin people had lost their native language and can only speak Cantonese or Mandarin, and another third who are bilingual in the Gin Vietnamese and Chinese languages. The survey suggested a decline in the use of the Gin language, but in the 2000s, there appeared to be a revival in the use of the language.

== Culture ==
Gin people like antiphonal songs which are melodious and lyrical. Their traditional instruments include the two-stringed fiddle, flute, drum, gong and the single-stringed fiddle, a unique musical instrument of the ethnic group. Folk stories and legends abound. Their favorite dances feature lanterns, fancy colored sticks, embroidery and dragons.

Gin costume is simple and practical. Traditionally, women wear tight-fitting, collarless short blouses buttoned in front, similar to what is worn in the south of Vietnam, as well as broad black or brown trousers. When going out, they would put on a light colored gown with narrow sleeves. Men wear long jackets reaching down to the knees and girdles. Now, most people dress themselves like their Han neighbors, though a few elderly women retain their tradition and a few young women coil their hair and dye their teeth black.

Many Gin are believers of Buddhism or Taoism, with a few followers of Catholicism. The biggest festival of the Gin people is the Ha Festival, and has been recognized as a national intangible cultural heritage of China.

== See also ==
- Hoa people
- Vietnamese people in Hong Kong
- Vietnamese people in Taiwan
