= Deaths in April 2000 =

The following is a list of notable deaths in April 2000.

Entries for each day are listed alphabetically by surname. A typical entry lists information in the following sequence:

- Name, age, country of citizenship at birth, subsequent country of citizenship (if applicable), reason for notability, cause of death (if known), and reference.

== April 2000 ==
=== 1 ===
- Eric Bishop, 74, Canadian sports journalist and broadcaster.
- Dorothy Whitson Freed, 81, New Zealand composer.
- Alexander Mackenzie Stuart, Baron Mackenzie-Stuart, 75, British judge.
- Graham Mann, 75, British competitive sailor and Olympic medallist (1956, 1960).
- Willard J. Smith, 89, United States Coast Guard admiral.

=== 2 ===
- Zekeriya Aknazarov, 75, Soviet statesman.
- Fred Kwasi Apaloo, 79, Ghanaian judge.
- Synnøve Anker Aurdal, 91, Norwegian textile artist.
- Rod Bonella, 62, Australian long-distance runner and horse trainer, cancer.
- Bunney Brooke, 80, Australian actress and casting director, (Round the Twist, Number 96, E Street), bowel and liver cancer.
- Tommaso Buscetta, 71, Italian Mafia informant, cancer.
- Piet Coetser, 56, South African general.
- Eli Coppola, 38, American poet, heart attack.
- Greta Gynt, 83, Norwegian singer, dancer and actress.
- Robert Sainsbury, 93, British businessman and art benefactor.
- Carl Günther Weiss, 84, Danish Olympic field hockey player (1936).
- Slava Zupančič, 68, Slovenian Olympic alpine skier (1956).

=== 3 ===
- Arne Aas, 68, Norwegian actor, director, and screenwriter.
- Dina Abramowicz, 90-91, American historian.
- Milko Bobotsov, 68, Bulgarian chess grandmaster.
- Jean Dominique, 69, Haitian journalist and activist, shot.
- Mahpeyker Hanımsultan, 82, Ottoman princess.
- Marta Hoepffner, 88, German artist and photographer.
- Eri Irianto, 26, Indonesian football player, heart attack suffered during a match.
- Evelyn Irons, 99, Scottish journalist and war correspondent.
- Egil Jevanord, 81, Norwegian footballer.
- Terence McKenna, 53, American ethnobotanist, mystic, psychonaut and author, brain cancer.
- Gail O'Rourke, 57, American Olympic volleyball player (1964).
- James Sanfey, 77, Irish Fine Gael politician.

=== 4 ===
- Brandãozinho, 74, Brazilian footballer.
- Diamond Teeth Mary, 97, American singer and vaudeville entertainer.
- Charlie Kray, 72, English boxer and convicted criminal, heart complications.
- Rolf Pingel, 86, German Luftwaffe flying ace and recipient of the Knight's Cross of the Iron Cross during World War II.
- John W. Rollins, 84, American businessman and politician.
- Mirko Šarić, 21, Argentine footballer, suicide by hanging.
- Carl L. Sitter, 77, US Marine Corps officer and Medal of Honor recipient.
- William Stokoe, 80, American linguist.
- Sy Weintraub, 76, American film and television producer, pancreatic cancer.

=== 5 ===
- Kanika Banerjee, 75, Indian singer.
- Elisa Breton, 93, French artist and writer.
- Nematollah Gorji, 74, Iranian theatre and film actor.
- Albert Ivanov, 68, Soviet Estonian Olympic long-distance runner (1956).
- Heinrich Müller, 90, Austrian football player and coach.
- Lee Petty, 86, American race car driver and member of the NASCAR Hall of Fame, abdominal aortic aneurysm.
- Louis Rupprecht, 74, American Olympic speed skater (1948).
- Irina Sebrova, 85, Soviet Air Forces pilot and officer.
- Chino 'Fats' Williams, 66, American actor, complications from kidney failure.
- Rolando Zanni, 86, Italian alpine skier and Olympian (1936).
- Janusz Ziółkowski, 75, Polish sociologist and politician.

=== 6 ===
- John deKoven Alsop, 84, American politician.
- Carlos Pineda Alvarado, 63, Ecuadorian footballer.
- Maria Arndt, 70, Polish Olympic sprinter (1952).
- Habib Bourguiba, 96, president of Tunisia.
- Lofty Brits, 73, South African cricketer.
- Dennis Cambell, 92, British pilot.
- Eugene C. Cashman, 78, American policeman and businessman.
- James A. Conlon, 79, American civil servant.
- Mohammad-Ali Fardin, 69, Iranian actor and wrestler, cardiac arrest.
- Bertram Forer, 85, American psychologist.
- John Heap, 92, British sprinter and Olympian (1928).
- Don Johnson, 88, American baseball player (Chicago Cubs).
- Bernardino Echeverría Ruiz, 87, Ecuadorian Roman Catholic cardinal.

=== 7 ===
- Bjarte Birkeland, 79, Norwegian literary researcher.
- Dick Blakeslee, 78, American professor.
- John P. Blewett, 89, Canadian-American physicist.
- Broery, 51, Indonesian singer, stroke.
- Meriel Forbes, 86, English actress.
- Heinz, 57, German-British bassist and singer, stroke.
- Masayuki Minami, 58, Japanese Olympic volleyball player.
- Moacir Barbosa Nascimento, 79, Brazilian football goalkeeper, heart attack.
- Werner Rauh, 86, German biologist, botanist and author.

=== 8 ===
- Ibrahim Ahmad, 86, Kurdish writer, novelist and judge.
- Alfredo Alcala, 74, Filipino comics artist, cancer.
- Morris Cargill, 85, Jamaican politician.
- Bernie Grant, 56, British politician, heart attack.
- Gunnar Landelius, 82, Swedish sportsman and Olympian (1948).
- Claire Trevor, 90, American actress, respiratory failure.
- Harry Williamson, 86, American middle-distance runner and Olympian (1936).
- František Šťastný, 72, Czech Grand Prix motorcycle road racer.
- Peter Willmott, 76, British sociologist.

=== 9 ===
- Alan Betrock, 49, American music publisher, author and record producer, cancer.
- Hansi Brand, 87, Hungarian-Israeli zionist activist and rescue worker during World War II.
- John Brown, 65, Scottish footballer.
- Tony Cliff, 82, British Trotskyist writer and journalist.
- Catherine Crook de Camp, 92, American science fiction and fantasy author.
- Nick Frascella, 85, American basketball player.
- Robert Komer, 78, American diplomat.
- W. Bruce Lincoln, 61, American scholar and author, complications from cancer.
- James William Malone, 80, American prelate of the Catholic Church.

=== 10 ===
- Rabah Bitat, 74, Algerian politician.
- Walter Blattmann, 79, American Olympic gymnast (1952).
- Angela Yu Chien, 57, Chinese-Hong Kong actress, cancer.
- Edward M. Dickson, 88, American politician.
- Arnold Johnson, 78, American actor (Putney Swope, Shaft, Menace II Society).
- Peter Jones, 79, British actor, septicaemia following surgery.
- Larry Linville, 60, American actor (M*A*S*H, Mannix, Earth Girls Are Easy), lung cancer.
- Olappamanna, 77, Indian poet, heart attack.
- Kirsten Rolffes, 71, Danish actress, breast cancer.
- Horacio Siburu, 78, Argentine Olympic modern pentathlete (1948).

=== 11 ===
- George Barr, 84, Scottish-American soccer player.
- Tomas Campo Jr., Philippine Marine Corps soldier, killed in action.
- Diana Darvey, 54, English actress, singer and dancer, fall.
- André Deutsch, 82, Hungarian-British publisher.
- Lucia Dlugoszewski, 74, Polish-American composer, poet, and inventor.
- Dewayne Douglas, 68, American football player (New York Giants), and coach.
- Salvador Lazo Lazo, 81, Filipino prelate of the Roman Catholic Church.
- Flaminio Piccoli, 84, Italian politician.
- Olav Økern, 88, Norwegian cross-country skier and Olympic medalist (1948, 1952).

=== 12 ===
- Niaz Ahmed, 54, Pakistani cricketer.
- Ingemund Bengtsson, 81, Swedish politician, and Speaker of the Riksdag.
- Leonard F. Bersani, 67, American politician.
- Helen Blane, 86, British Olympic alpine skier (1936).
- David Crighton, 57, British mathematician and physicist.
- Carmen Dillon, 91, English film art director and production designer.
- Pierre Dondelinger, 87, French sprinter and Olympian (1936).
- Max Hofmeister, 87, Austrian football player and Olympian (1936).
- Ronald Lockley, 96, Welsh ornithologist and naturalist.
- Gerald Francis O'Keefe, 82, American bishop of the Catholic Church, heart attack.
- Christopher Pettiet, 24, American actor, accidental drug overdose.
- John Read, 74, British Olympic bobsledder (1956).
- Giles Shaw, 68, British politician, stroke.
- James Vorenberg, 72, American legal scholar, heart attack.

=== 13 ===
- Peter Archer, 51, Australian martial artist, cancer.
- Giorgio Bassani, 84, Italian writer.
- Frenchy Bordagaray, 90, American baseball player.
- Philippe Brood, 35, Dutch politician, heart attack.
- Mawuse Dake, Ghanaian politician and academic.
- Aivars Gipslis, 63, Latvian chess grandmaster.
- Inglis Gundry, 94, English composer, novelist, and musicologist.
- Pete Minger, 57, American trumpeter and flugelhornist.
- Carlos Pacheco, 74, Costa Rican Olympic sports shooter (1968).
- Daniel Holcombe Thomas, 93, American district judge (United States District Court for the Southern District of Alabama).
- Albert Turner, 64, American civil rights activist, abdominal bleeding.

=== 14 ===
- Bob Barthelson, 75, American baseball player (New York Giants).
- Gurudas Chatterjee, 56, Indian politician, assassinated.
- Humphrey Cripps, 84, English businessman and a philanthropist.
- Ludwig Durek, 79, Austrian football player and Olympian (1948).
- Sebastián Fleitas, 53, Paraguayan football player, stroke.
- Ted Grouya, 89, Romanian-American composer.
- Donald Gullick, 75, Welsh rugby player.
- Devereaux Jennings, 75, American Olympic alpine skier (1948).
- Phil Katz, 37, American computer programmer (zip file format), pancreatitis.
- August R. Lindt, 94, Swiss lawyer and diplomat.
- Wilf Mannion, 81, English professional footballer.
- Charlie O'Rourke, 82, American football player (Chicago Bears, Los Angeles Dons, Baltimore Colts), and coach.
- George E. Taylor, 94, American sinologist.
- Bo Wallace, 71, American baseball player.

=== 15 ===
- Rainy Brown, 94, English cricketer.
- Guillermo Clavero, 78, Chilean footballer.
- Edward Gorey, 75, American writer and illustrator, heart failure.
- Irina Gubanova, 60, Russian ballerina and film actress, pneumonia.
- Ba Kyi, 87, Burmese artist.
- Thomas Joseph Lobsinger, 73, Canadian Roman Catholic prelate, bishop of Whitehorse (since 1987), plane crash.
- Ernest Nègre, 92, French toponymist.
- Todd Webb, 94, American photographer.

=== 16 ===
- Henry Bird, 90, English artist.
- Abram Chayes, 77, American legal scholar associated with the administration of John F. Kennedy, pancreatic cancer.
- Harry Clarke, 77, English football player.
- Henry Daniels, 87, British statistician.
- Joe DeLaCruz, 62, Native American activist, heart attack.
- Domingo Federico, 83, Argentine bandoneon player, songwriter and actor.
- Policarpo Paz García, 67, Honduran military leader, kidney failure.
- Hayati Hamzaoğlu, 67, Turkish actor.
- Ossi Kauppi, 70, Finnish ice hockey player and Olympian (1952).
- Johnny Malokas, 83, American basketball player.
- Ann Mui, 40, Hong Kong singer and sister of Anita Mui, cervical cancer.
- Syed Putra of Perlis, 79, Malaysian monarch, heart attack.
- Sherwood Washburn, 88, American physical anthropologist.

=== 17 ===
- Sabrina Bulleri, 41, Italian Paralympic athlete.
- Pyotr Glebov, 85, Russian actor.
- Normand Hamel, 44, Canadian outlaw biker and gangster, shot during the Quebec Biker War.
- Alice Marriott, 92, American philanthropist.
- Volodymyr Panteley, 54, Soviet Ukrainian Olympic middle-distance runner (1972).
- Paula Salomon-Lindberg, 102, German classical contralto.
- Megan Williams, 43, Australian actress and singer, breast cancer.

=== 18 ===
- Herb Ball, 81, American basketball player.
- Isaac Berenblum, 96, Polish-Israeli biochemist.
- Mary Cannell, 86, English educator and historian.
- Tony Frank, 56, American actor (North and South, UHF, A Perfect World).
- Maxwell Khobe, 50, Nigerian Army general, encephalitis.
- Irja Lipasti, 94, Finnish sprinter and Olympian (1936).
- Martin Mailman, 67, American composer.
- Erzsi Pártos, 93, Hungarian actress.

=== 19 ===
- Louis Applebaum, 82, Canadian film score composer and conductor.
- Bill Briggs, 75, Canadian football player.
- Robert Glen Coe, 44, American murderer, execution by lethal injection.
- Masakazu Fukuda, 27, Japanese professional wrestler, brain hemorrhage.
- Kyung-Chik Han, 97, Korean pastor.
- Buster Haywood, 90, American baseball player.
- Grigor Khanjyan, 73, Soviet-Armenian artist, painter, and illustrator.
- Chang Kyou-chul, 53, South Korean boxer and Olympic bronze medalist (1968).
- Krum Milev, 84, Bulgarian football player and manager.
- Candace Newmaker, 10, American victim of child abuse, suffocation.
- Sergey Zalygin, 86, Soviet writer and environmentalist.

=== 20 ===
- Fred Boensch, 79, American gridiron football player (Washington Redskins).
- G. Chockalingam, 63, Indian politician.
- Bill Dean, 78, British actor.
- Willy Harlander, 68, German actor, heart attack.
- Philip Childs Keenan, 92, American astronomer.

=== 21 ===
- Simcha Zissel Broide, 87-88, Israeli rosh yeshiva.
- Gunther Gerzs, 84, Hungarian-Mexican painter, director and screenwriter.
- Richard Menapace, 85, Austrian-Italian cyclist.
- Al Purdy, 81, Canadian poet.
- Robert H. Robins, 78, British linguist.
- Susan Stephen, 68, English film actress.
- Nigar Sultana, 67, Indian actress.

=== 22 ===
- Rohitha Neil Akmeemana, Sri Lankan brigadier, dehydration.
- Fritz W. Alexander II, 73, American judge, cancer.
- Carey Hoyt Bostian, 93, American educator.
- Alexander H. Cohen, 79, American theatrical producer, emphysema.
- Arnt Eliassen, 84, Norwegian meteorologist.
- Toon Hermans, 83, Dutch comedian, singer and writer.
- Edwin O'Donovan, 85, American art director (Heaven Can Wait, One Flew Over the Cuckoo's Nest, Hardcore), Oscar winner (1979).
- Robert W. Porter, Jr., 91, United States Army general, heart attack.
- Margaret Singana, 62, South African musician.

=== 23 ===
- Jerry Catena, 98, American mobster (Genovese crime family), heart attack.
- James Chalgren, 48, American gay activist.
- Erle Cocke Jr., 74, American businessman and war veteran, pancreatic cancer.
- Enzo Degani, 65, Italian classical philologist.
- Clarence Hollimon, 62, American guitarist.
- Pearl Padamsee, 69, Indian actress, director and producer.
- Shigeru Sugiura, 92, Japanese manga artist.
- David Thorne, 66, British army general, cancer.
- Raşit Tolun, 80, Turkish Olympic alpine skier (1948).

=== 24 ===
- Derek Allhusen, 86, British Olympic equestrian (1968).
- Margaret Arlen, 83, American talk show host.
- John Beck, 65, New Zealand cricket player.
- Chic Brodie, 63, Scottish footballer, prostate cancer.
- Pru Chapman, 50, New Zealand competition swimmer and Olympian (1968).
- Dilu Melo, 86, Brazilian singer, songwriter, instrumentalist and folklorist.
- Ulla Isaksson, 83, Swedish author and screenplay writer.
- William Moore, 84, English character actor.
- Karamana Janardanan Nair, 63, Indian film actor, stroke complicated by diabetes.
- Barkin' Bill Smith, 71, American blues singer and songwriter, pancreatic cancer.
- George Volkoff, 86, Russian-Canadian physicist and academic, series of strokes.

=== 25 ===
- Ghislaine Alexander, 78, English baroness.
- Jun Aristorenas, 66, Filipino actor.
- Niels Viggo Bentzon, 80, Danish composer and pianist.
- Richard Carr, 89, Indian field hockey player and Olympic champion (1932).
- Richard Donahoe, 90, Canadian lawyer and politician.
- Ben Fernandez, 75, American politician and financial consultant.
- Alla Larionova, 69, Soviet and Russian theater and film actress, heart attack.
- Lucien Le Cam, 75, French mathematician.
- David Merrick, 88, American theatre producer and director.
- Franjo Rupnik, 78, Croatian football player.
- Edna Scheer, 73, American baseball player.
- Mukhram Sharma, 90, Indian film lyricist, script, and story writer.
- Rita Vittadini, 86, Italian Olympic gymnast (1928).

=== 26 ===
- Gregory Gillespie, 63, American magic realist painter, suicide by hanging.
- Ernest Victor Siracusa, 81, American diplomat.
- Len Smith, 82, Australian rugby player, bowel cancer.
- Herbert Wechsler, 90, American legal scholar.

=== 27 ===
- C. R. Boxer, 96, British historian.
- Jerry Buckley, 67, American cartoonist, bacterial pneumonia.
- Ovid S. Crohmălniceanu, 78, Romanian literary critic and science fiction writer.
- André Desjardins, 69, Canadian union official, shot.
- St. Julian Devine, 88, American politician.
- Clifford Forsythe, 70, Northern Irish Ulster Unionist Party politician, complications from a heart attack and stroke.
- Brooks Lawrence, 75, American baseball player (St. Louis Cardinals, Cincinnati Redlegs/Reds).
- William P. Mahoney Jr., 83, American attorney and diplomat.
- Errett Weir McDiarmid, 90, American librarian and academic.
- Yusof Rawa, 76, Malaysian politician, pneumonia.
- Vicki Sue Robinson, 45, American singer ("Turn the Beat Around") and actress, cancer.

=== 28 ===
- Richard Bertram, 84, American boat builder and sailor.
- Kim Borg, 80, Finnish bass, teacher and composer.
- Arthur Dake, 90, American chess player, natural causes.
- Jerzy Einhorn, 74, Polish-Swedish medical doctor, researcher and politician, leukemia.
- Federico Brito Figueroa, 78, Venezuelan marxist historian and anthropologist.
- Penelope Fitzgerald, 83, British writer.
- Sergey Khristianovich, 91, Soviet/Russian mechanics scientist.
- Jack Merson, 78, American baseball player.
- Doug Phillips, 80, Welsh rugby player.

=== 29 ===
- Jane Cadwell, 85, American competition swimmer and Olympian (1932).
- Chen Fangyun, 84, Chinese electrical engineer.
- Chintamani Panigrahi, 78, Indian independence activist and writer.
- John Patrick, 81, American gridiron football player (Pittsburgh Steelers).
- Harriet Lange Rheingold, 92, American child development psychologist, lung cancer.
- Antonio Buero Vallejo, 83, Spanish playwright, stroke.
- Pham Van Dong, 94, Vietnamese communist politician, Prime Minister (1955–1976).
- Buck Varner, 69, American baseball player (Washington Senators).
- Italo Zingarelli, 70, Italian film producer.

=== 30 ===
- Maggie Calloway, 89, Filipina-born American actress.
- Domingo Deluana, Philippine Marine Corps sergeant, killed in action.
- Vasilis Georgiadis, 78, Greek film director and actor.
- Henry Goode, 81, American Olympic field hockey player (1948).
- Poul Hartling, 85, Danish politician, Prime Minister (1973–1975).
- Bernhard Heiden, 89, German-American composer.
- Jonah Jones, 90, American jazz trumpeter.
- Bill Lynn, 78, American baseball player.
- Marjorie Noël, 54, French pop singer, cerebral hemorrhage.
- Edouard Siegrist, 76, Swiss Olympic field hockey player (1948).
- Richard Tsimba, 34, Zimbabwean rugby player, traffic collision.
- Ruth Turner, 86, American marine biologist and malacologist.
- Barry Ulanov, 82, American writer, colorectal cancer.
- Leon Vandaele, 67, Belgian road bicycle racer.
- Arlette Vassy, 87, French geophysicist, identified a hole in the ozone layer in 1961.
