= Lidia Massa Positano =

Italian hellenist (1912–1984)

- Born: Lidia Positano; 1912; Naples, Italy
- Died: 1984 (aged 71–72)
- Occupation: Classical scholar

Academic background
- Education: University of Naples
- Academic advisor: Vittorio De Falco

Academic work
- Discipline: Classics
- Institutions: University of Messina; University of Naples Federico II
- Main interests: Greek literature, Greek palaeography, Byzantine studies

Lidia Massa Positano (b. Lidia Positano; 1912 – 1984) was an Italian classical scholar, Professor at the University of Messina and at the University of Naples Federico II.

== Biography ==
=== Early life and education ===
Born in Naples, Positano graduated in Classics from the University of Naples, a student of Vittorio De Falco. Aged only 13, she published a book of original poetry, followed by a second collection in 1929, both of which were reviewed and praised by Ada Negri. Positano and Negri had an epistolary exchange between 1925 and 1930, which has resurfaced only recently and is now kept at the library of the Università Cattolica.

=== Work ===
As a scholar, she was 'libero docente' in Greek literature at the University of Naples, then (from 1954) Professor in Greek and Latin grammar at the University of Messina, and later in Greek literature at the University of Naples where she also taught Greek palaeography. She published essays on Sappho, Sophocles and Solon. A "filologa classica non classicista", she had an interest in late antique Greek literature and critically edited the letters of Aeneas of Gaza and a treatise by Theophylact Simocatta, and, in the field of Byzantine studies, the scholia on the "Persians" by Aeschylus written by Demetrius Triclinius and John Tzetzes' essay on Ancient Greek comedy as well as his commentary on Aristophanes' "Plutus". She also translated and commented the first four mimiambs by Herodas and the fragments of Epicurean philosophy.

== Selected publications ==
=== Monographs ===
- Arco Magrì, M.; Massa Positano, L., eds. (1964). Lessico sintattico Laurenziano. Collana di studi classici, 1. Naples: Libreria Scientifica Editrice.
- Demetrius Triclinius (1948). Massa Positano, L. (ed.). In Aeschyli Persas scholia. Collana di studi greci, 13. Naples: Libreria Scientifica Editrice.
- Demetrius Triclinius (1963). Massa Positano, L. (ed.). In Aeschyli Persas scholia. Collana di studi greci, 13 (2nd ed.). Naples: Libreria Scientifica Editrice.
- Enea di Gaza (1950). Massa Positano, L. (ed.). Epistole. Collana di studi greci, 19. Naples: Libreria Scientifica Editrice.
- Enea di Gaza (1962). Massa Positano, L. (ed.). Epistole. Collana di studi greci, 19 (2nd ed.). Naples: Libreria Scientifica Editrice.
- Eroda (1970). Massa Positano, L. (ed.). Mimiambo I. Collana di studi greci, 51. Naples: Libreria Scientifica Editrice.
- Eroda (1971). Massa Positano, L. (ed.). Mimiambo II. Collana di studi greci, 55. Naples: Libreria Scientifica Editrice.
- Eroda (1972). Massa Positano, L. (ed.). Mimiambo III. Collana di studi greci, 56. Naples: Libreria Scientifica Editrice.
- Eroda (1973). Massa Positano, L. (ed.). Mimiambo IV. Collana di studi greci, 58. Naples: Libreria Scientifica Editrice.
- Massa Positano, L. (1945). Saffo. Collana di studi greci, 2. Naples: Libreria Scientifica Editrice.
- Massa Positano, L. (1946). L'unità dell'Aiace di Sofocle. Collana di studi greci, 6. Vol. I–II. Naples: Libreria Scientifica Editrice.
- Massa Positano, L. (1947). L'elegia di Solone alle Muse. Collana di studi greci, 12. Naples: Libreria Scientifica Editrice.
- Massa Positano, L. (1950a). Corso ufficiale di letteratura greca. Vol. I. La tradizione manoscritta di Eschilo. Naples: Libreria Scientifica Editrice.
- Massa Positano, L. (1950b). Corso ufficiale di letteratura greca. Vol. II. La metrica dei Persiani. Naples: Libreria Scientifica Editrice.
- Massa Positano, L. (1950c). Corso ufficiale di letteratura greca. Vol. III. Gli scolii di Demetrio Triclinio ai Persiani. Naples: Libreria Scientifica Editrice.
- Massa Positano, L. (1953). La tradizione manoscritta delle Quaestiones physicae di Teofilatto Simocatta. Collana di studi greci, 23-24. Naples: Libreria Scientifica Editrice.
- Massa Positano, L. (1955). Saffo. Collana di studi greci, 2 (2nd ed.). Naples: Libreria Scientifica Editrice.
- Massa Positano, L. (1966). La struttura classica della moderna civiltà occidentale. Libreria Scientifica Editrice.
- Massa Positano, L. (1967). Aspetti della civiltà bizantina. Naples: Libreria Scientifica Editrice.
- Massa Positano, L. (1967–1968). Filologia. Vol. I–III. Naples: Libreria Scientifica Editrice.
- Massa Positano, L. (1968). Corso di Letteratura greca. Naples: Libreria scientifica editrice.
- Massa Positano, L. (1969). Epicurea. Padua: CEDAM.
- Massa Positano, L. (1972). Appunti di paleografia greca. Naples: Libreria Scientifica Editrice.
- Massa Positano, L. (1974). Paleografia greca 1973-1974. Naples: Libreria Scientifica Editrice.
- Positano, L. (1925). Primi canti. Naples: Detken & Rocholl.
- Positano, L. (1929). Il gioco dell'anello. Naples: Detken & Rocholl.
- Teofilatto Simocatta (1953). Massa Positano, L. (ed.). Questioni naturali. Collana di studi greci, 23-24. Naples: Libreria Scientifica Editrice.
- Teofilatto Simocatta (1965). Massa Positano, L. (ed.). Questioni naturali. Collana di studi greci, 23-24 (2nd ed.). Naples: Libreria Scientifica Editrice.
- Tzetzes, J. (1960). Massa Positano, L. (ed.). Prolegomena et commentarium in Plutum. Scholia in Aristophanem, IV.1. Groningen: J. B. Wolters.

=== Articles ===
- Massa Positano, L. (1946). "Nugae". PP. 1 (3): 359–372.
- Massa Positano, L. (1947a). "Osservazioni sull'edizione eschilea di Demetrio Triclinio". Dioniso. 10 (4): 247–265.
- Massa Positano, L. (1948a). "Ettore Romagnoli traduttore". Dioniso. 11 (2): 85–98.
- Massa Positano, L. (1948b). "La battaglia di Psittalia in Eschilo". GIF. 1 (3): 252–254.
- Massa Positano, L. (1948c). "Teopompo e i giardini di Re Mida". GIF. 1 (3): 250–252.
- Massa Positano, L. (1949). "Sopra alcuni versi dei Persiani di Eschilo". Dioniso. 12 (1): 63–67.
- Massa Positano, L. (1952). "Frustula". GIF. 5 (3): 198–211.1
- Massa Positano, L. (1955). "Θεάομαι e θεάω". GIF. 8 (4): 349–358.
- Massa Positano, L. (1957a). "Lessico sintattico laurenziano". GIF. 10 (4): 293–314.
- Massa Positano, L. (1957b). "Lexicon Laurentianum Parvum". RIL. 91: 507–530.

== Bibliography ==
- Degani, E. (1989). "Italia. La filologia greca nel secolo XX". La filologia greca e latina nel secolo XX. Atti del Congresso Internazionale: Roma, CNR, 17-21 settembre 1984. Biblioteca di Studi Antichi, 56. Vol. II. Pisa: Giardini Editori e Stampatori. pp. 1065–1140.
- Gastaldi, M. (1958). Dizionario delle scrittrici italiane contemporanee. Milan: Gastaldi Editore. p. 362.
- Senna, P. (2018). "Nuovi autografi di Ada Negri nella Biblioteca d'Ateneo" (PDF). Tralecarte. 8: 1–2.
- Stagnitti, B. (2018). "«Lei non sa che faticosa strada sia quella dell'arte». Inediti epistolari negriani a Lidia Positano". Rivista di Letteratura Italiana. 36 (1): 129–145. doi:10.19272/201802201008.
