= Gilberto de Syllos =

- de Syllos performing in 2016

Background information
- Also known as: Seo Manouche
- Born: Gilberto de Syllos Rosa; April 27, 1967 (age 59); Campinas, São Paulo, Brazil
- Genres: Brazilian music, jazz
- Occupations: Musician, composer, actor, dubbing director
- Instruments: Upright bass, bass guitar, acoustic guitar, electric guitar
- Years active: 1985–present
- Label: Various

Gilberto de Syllos is a Brazilian musician, voice actor and has been a professional bassist and music professor for more than 30 years. Born Gilberto de Syllos Rosa, in Campinas, Brazil, on 27 April 1967, he is now based in São Paulo, where he teaches music and performs as a solo artist and with a wide variety of popular Brazilian and international acts. Currently, he also voices Nine in the Portuguese dub of Numberblocks.

== Career ==
De Syllos holds a bachelor's degree in music from Campinas State University (UNICAMP) and is currently (April/2018) a master's degree candidate at the same university.

Since 2002, he has been on the faculty at Faculdade de Música Souza Lima in São Paulo, teaching the Electric and Acoustic Bass programs as well as Music History, Theory, and Ear Training.

De Syllos has authored several books, including “Drumset and Bass in Brazilian Popular Music”, “ “Electric Bass Techniques in Brazilian Popular Music,” and "Baião and Northeastern Brazilian Rhythms.” These last two books have been released in Europe and in the United States by Advance Music Editors. De Syllos participated on the play-along recording and book, “Brazilian Music of Roberto Menescal ” and "Brazilian Music in Odd Meters," which were released by Editora Souza Lima.

As a professor, he has participated in clinics, workshops, and music festivals held in the main cities of Brazil and abroad, most recently in the United States, Venezuela, Germany, and Portugal.

In 2015 he produced the show “Basstucada” (available in English and Portuguese on Youtube which was recorded live at the Sesc Campinas. Basstucada covers the entire career of De Syllos as a player and as a composer.

In 2014, he received a special invitation by the Campinas Symphonic Orchestra to play with singer/composer Ivan Lins in the celebrations of the orchestra's 85th anniversary.

Since 2013 he has been the bass player of the Orquestra Rock de Campinas (SP) in spectacles produced and directed by conductor and Martin Lazarov.

De Syllos has been a columnist for the Brazilian Edition of Bass Player magazine (2012/2013), writing articles about acoustic and upright bass playing.

He composed the soundtrack to Diego Ruiz de Aquino and Helton Ladeira's award-winning short film “Noir” (2007).

He was praised by The New York Times critics and referred to as "the genial Gilberto de Syllos" for his work on the show “da Corda pro Pé” on Broadway in 2006.

His first CD, Tocando Baixo (1996), was nominated for the Prêmio Sharp in 1997.

Over the years, de Syllos has been working on a solo career as a composer and band leader, and has accompanied Brazilian and International artists like Ivan Vilela, Izzy Gordon, Paulo Jobim, Roberto Menescal, Ná Ozetti, Toninho Ferraguti, Duofel, Hermeto Pascoal, Lenine, Zeca Baleiro, Marlui Miranda, Lupa Santiago, Pedro de Alcântara, Bina Coquet, Hot Jazz Club, Bloody Mary & Os Caipirinhas, Marcelo Onofri, Connie Evingson, Laura Penn, Maria Sole (Italy), Sally Burgues (New Zealand), Robin Nolan (Netherlands), Richard Smith (England), Thomas Walburn (Denmark), Connie Evingson, Laura Penn, and Jason S. Smith (USA), Niclas Campagnol (Switzerland), Dario Napoli (Italy) among others, in stage performances and recordings.

More recently, De Syllos has dedicated more of his time to be the dubbing and musical director for Atma Entretenimento, in São Paulo, Brazil, where he creates Brazilian versions for a variety of projects including live-action and animated movies, broadcast series and documentaries, as well as supervising the whole dubbing and music production team in the studio.

== Seo Manouche ==
Whenever Gilberto de Syllos plays Gypsy Jazz/Jazz Manouche, he changes his stage name to Seo Manouche (Brazilian Portuguese for Mister Manouche) . His first album for this project, the eponymous Seo Manouche, contains original gypsy jazz songs sung in Brazilian Portuguese as shown in the local press and the Brazilian Edition of Bass Player magazine . The album blends Brazilian root music and Gypsy Jazz together. In 2015 he released both the CD and the awarded video clip titled "Já Que Tá Que Fique”. In 2017, he released his second album named “Cavaquinho de Itu”, in a partnership with songwriter Carlos Castelo (Língua de Trapo).

De Syllos performed with the Bina Coquet Trio in 2017, at the Django Amsterdam Festival in Holland, with a sound combined of Brazilian music with gypsy jazz and Django Reinhardt and received great reviews from Qintette magazine for his performance. Seo Manouche was the first act to be invited by musicologist Zuza Homem de Mello in his project "Zuzando nas Notas".

When describing the Seo Manouche project, De Syllos remarked “I am part of a small group of Brazilian musicians that are interpreters and performers of the style made famous by Django Reinhardt. I am a founding member of the Hot Jazz Club, pioneers in this style since 2003, with 3 CDs released. I started observing several Brazilian gypsy jazz musicians came from a sophisticated academic world, unlike the European performers. As a matter of fact, there was no tradition in the style in Brazil, however, in the last 5 years, several CDs have been released, with new bands being formed. One of the qualities of such a style in Brazil is that most of the performers follow a blend with the rich universe of Brazilian rhythms such as samba, maxixe, xóte, and frevo, with the result being a sort of hybrid music. For this reason, I consider it most important for my research this previous experience with the Brazilian manouche jazz, which has resulted in enthusiasm and new interpretations of a rhythm that has been played form for more than 80 years in Europe.”

Other Seo Manouche short films include "Esta Canção de Natal" (This Christmas Song), "Cavaquinho de Itu" and "Midnight in São Paulo".

== Basstucada ==
The Basstucada concert was performed on September 15, 2013, at the Sesc Theater in Campinas, SP, Brazil. Video made available on Youtube on April 28, 2015.

The performance covered the 30-year career of Gilberto de Syllos. The program, divided in two parts had his original songs played by Fábio Bergamini (percussion), Lucas Casacio (drums) and Edu Guimarães (accordion). For the second part, songs and arrangements by Ivan Vilela who played his 10-string Brazilian guitar, with Gilberto de Syllos playing the upright bass and special guest Paula Pi (viola and fiddle).

The concert was first promoted on YouTube, with the musicians explaining their participations and the importance of their instruments, in a comprehensive way. Songs like “Cyclone” and “Brazilian bass” came about written exercises originally released as part of Gilberto's Guide for the Bass Guitar.

De Syllos himself, when describing the Basstucada project, commented: “When choosing the performances, I considered the importance of the musicians involved in each project, the period in which such performances occurred (from 2013 to 2016), how demanding each of the musical performances were, and how successful they were. As a bassist and interpreter of bass lines in each of these concerts, I needed full knowledge of several elements that characterize the music as a language, resulting in an adequate and different interpretation. Basstucada was the performance that had the greatest impact of all, for it was the celebration of 30 years of my career as a musician and composer. It was also the performance that generated the production and recording of the DVD, which comes with the testimony from all the musicians involved in the project and such a format resulted in “didactic performance”. During the testimonies/interviews, the musicians gave explanations about the function of each instrument and their context within the Basstucada concert. Basstucada is an instrumental performance where I use the bass as an extension of my own body, with moments of great interaction with the audience as is the case of “In prompt to you”, which is an improvisation number where musician and audience interact beautifully".

PART I 01. Cyclone (Gilberto de Syllos) 02. Brazilian bass (Gilberto de Syllos) 03. Basstucada (Gilberto de Syllos) 04. Esposa (Gilberto de Syllos) 05. Santa Teresa (Edu Guimarães) 06. Merlin (Gilberto de Syllos) 07. Carinhoso (Pixinguinha) 08. Aquiles otro loco (Gilberto de Syllos) 09. Forró do Gorducho (Gilberto de Syllos) 10. Tocando baixo (Gilberto de Syllos)

PART II 11. Ar (Ivan Vilela) 12. Fogo (Ivan Vilela) 13. Sertão (Ivan Vilela) 14. Ponteio (Edu Lobo/Capinan) 15. In prompt to you (Gilberto de Syllos) 16. Carreirando (Pereira da Viola) 17. Barquisimeto (Gilberto de Syllos)

== Discography ==
Studio albums and participations

Year	Record/Artist
2018	Izzy Gordon
2017	Cavaquinho de Itu - Seo Manouche
2016	Chama - Hot Jazz Club
2015	Paisagens Interiores - Rafael Tomaz
2015	Já Que Tá Que Fique - Seo Manouche
2015	Bina Coquet - Bina Coquet
2014	Caravane - Hot Jazz Club
2014	Alma Capixaba - Pedro de Alcântara
2014	The Nashville Sessions - Fernando Seifarth
2013	Lancelot's Adventures - Marcelo Onofri
2013	Play Along Música Brasileira - Roberto Menescal
2009	Live Gem - Gilberto de Syllos and Nelson Pinton
2008	Técnicas Para Baixo Elétrico na Música Brasileira - Gilberto de Syllos
2008	Música Brasileira em Métricas Ímpares - Lupa Santiago e Carlos Ezequiel
2007	Soundtrack “Noir” - Gilberto de Syllos and Marcelo Onofri
2007	Temporâneo - Marcelo Onofri
2006	Minha Vontade - Vania Lucas
2006	Desassossego - Izabel Padovani
2004	Matisse - Hot Jazz Club
2002	Bateria e Contrabaixo na Música Popular Brasileira - Gilberto de Syllos and Ramon Montanhaur
2002	Dança - Marcelo Onofri Quinteto
2002	João Alexandre 20 Anos - João Alexandre
2002	Pedra Coração - Pedro de Alcântara
2001	Dualle - Gilberto de Syllos e Flavio Corillow
2000	L - Marco Ferrari
2000	Boy Ya - Ramon Montanhaur
1996	Tocando Baixo - Gilberto de Syllos
1991	Feito Figurante (LP) - Joel Damasceno
