= Ivan Vilela =

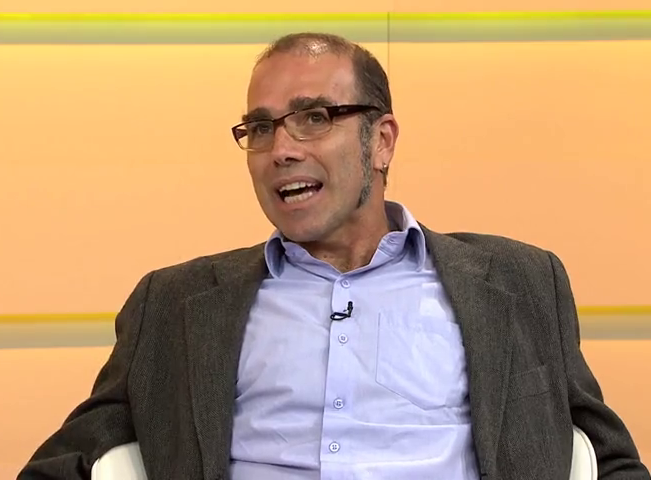
- Ivan Vilela in a program paying tribute to Inezita Barroso (2015).

Background information
- Born: Ivan Vilela Pinto; August 28, 1962 (age 63)
- Origin: Minas Gerais, Brazil
- Occupations: Musician, teacher, researcher
- Instrument: Viola caipira
- Labels: Kalamata, Sesc
- Website: www.ivanvilela.com.br

Ivan Vilela (born August 28, 1962 in Itajubá, Minas Gerais) is a Brazilian composer, arranger, researcher, teacher and viola caipira player. Ivan Vilela is currently a professor at the ECA - School of Communication and Arts of the University of São Paulo. He is the director of the Orquestra Filarmônica de Violas, a Brazilian orchestra composed by Brazilian violas. Ivan Vilela is one of the main ten-string guitarists (viola) nowadays. With a special style and very developed technique, he has more than 15 albums recorded, solo or with different groups, and was nominated for and awarded several prestigious prizes in Brazil.

== Biography ==
Ivan Vilela is the youngest of a family of eleven children. When he was 11 years old, Vilela received a guitar from his father. His first guitar teacher was Amaury Vieira, in 1973. He began his artistic career at age 18 playing with the "Pedra" Group and then the "Água doce" Group, who did research on the music roots from the state of Minas Gerais. Vilela studied History prior to studying Music Composition at the Universidade Estadual de Campinas (UNICAMP), where he earned a BA and an MA in Arts. In 1989, he moved to Campinas. In 1995, he started playing the viola as a solo instrument. Since 1996 he has been frequently performing not only in Brazil, but also in Spain, France, Britain, Italy, and Portugal. Vilela has researched popular culture for over 20 years. He is currently pursuing a doctorate in Social Psychology from the University of São Paulo with a thesis on the social history of Brazilian country music.

== Career ==
Vilela has been a researcher for over 30 years with the main focus of his quest for knowledge being manifestations of the popular culture in the Brazilian States of Minas Gerais and São Paulo.

He was a founding member of the Orquestra Filarmônica de Violas, an institution he ran for 10 years as a director, while also being responsible for the arrangements played by the orchestra during his tenure. Moreover, Vilela directed the prestigious Orquestra de Viola Caipira de São José dos Campos, in a partnership with the Fundação Cultural Cassiano Ricardo.

More recently, Vilela came up with the concept of a new graduate course for music, using the Brazilian Methodology of Teaching in a project ordered by the University of Taubaté, in the State of São Paulo.

Following the release of the album Viola Paulista, distributed by the Sesc label, Ivan Vilela was praised by mass media outlets such as the O Estado de S. Paulo as "one of the most important men in the processes of keeping the viola in the Brazilian culture".

In the booklet that accompanies the album, Vilela stated: "with vulgar origins in medieval and renaissance Portugal, the viola spread all over the lusophone world. However, the development and popularity of the instrument in Brazil is second to none. Here (in Brazil), the viola followed in the footsteps of the classical guitar luthery and slowly but steadily has been conquering markets and spaces once thought unimaginable. The concept we call 'caipira culture' is widespread over a region we call 'Paulistânia' where the caipira music has strength in numbers."

During an interview and performance on TV in 2017, when asked about his arrangements, on whether or not they were intuitive, Vilela explained that "first of all, one has to listen to a lot of music. We tend to think of intuition as a gift from God, whereas intuition is actually a spontaneous decision based on a great deal of work that has to be done beforehand". At the TV Horizonte showcase, Vilela performed the pieces "Viola Quebrada" (by Mario de Andrade, arranged by Vilela) and "Algodão" (Vilela).

== Other achievements ==
Endorser of Giannini strings.

Composer of the Ópera Caipira Cheiro de Mato e de Chão about a booklet authored by Jehovah Amaral.

Author of Cantando a Própria História- Música Caipira e Enraizamento, released at the Frankfurter Buchmesse - Frankfurt Book Fair - Germany, 2013.

== Discography ==
- 1985 — Hortelã (LP)
- 1994 — Trilhas (CD)
- 1997 — Trovadores do Vale (CD)
- 1997 — Espiral do Tempo (CD)
- 1997 — Violeiros do Brasil — SESC-Contemporary Nucleus (CD, live)
- 1998 — Paisagens (CD)
- 1999 — Rumos Musicais (CD)
- 1999 — Teatro do Descobrimento. With the group Anima and singer Anna Maria Kiefer (CD)
- 2002 — Retratos em Vários Compassos (CD)
- 2002 — Quatro Estórias — Stories from Rubem Alves converted into music by Ivan Vilela (CD)
- 2004 — Orquestra Filarmônica de Violas — Classics of Brazilian country music played by 20 violas (CD)
- 2004 — Caipira com Suzana Salles e Lenine Santos (CD) — Label: Rob Digital
- 2004 — Orquestra Filarmônica de Violas (CD)
- 2006 — Vereda Luminosa with Andréia Teixeira (CD)
- 2007 — Dez Cordas - Viola solo (CD)
- 2009 — Do Corpo à Raiz (CD)
- 2010 — Mais Caipira - com Suzana Salles e Lenine Santos
- 2011 — Pulo do Gato convida Ivan Vilela
- 2012 — Orquestra Filarmônica de Violas 2 (arrangements conduction and musical direction)
- 2018 — Piano e Viola, Benjamim Taubkin & Ivan Vilela
- 2018 — Orquestra do Estado do Mato Grosso toca Ivan Vilela. Soloist: Ivan Vilela
- 2018 — Que Língua Você Fala - Original Score for the Documentary

== See also ==
- Viola de cocho
- Braz da Viola
