= Viola de buriti =

Brazilian stringed instrument

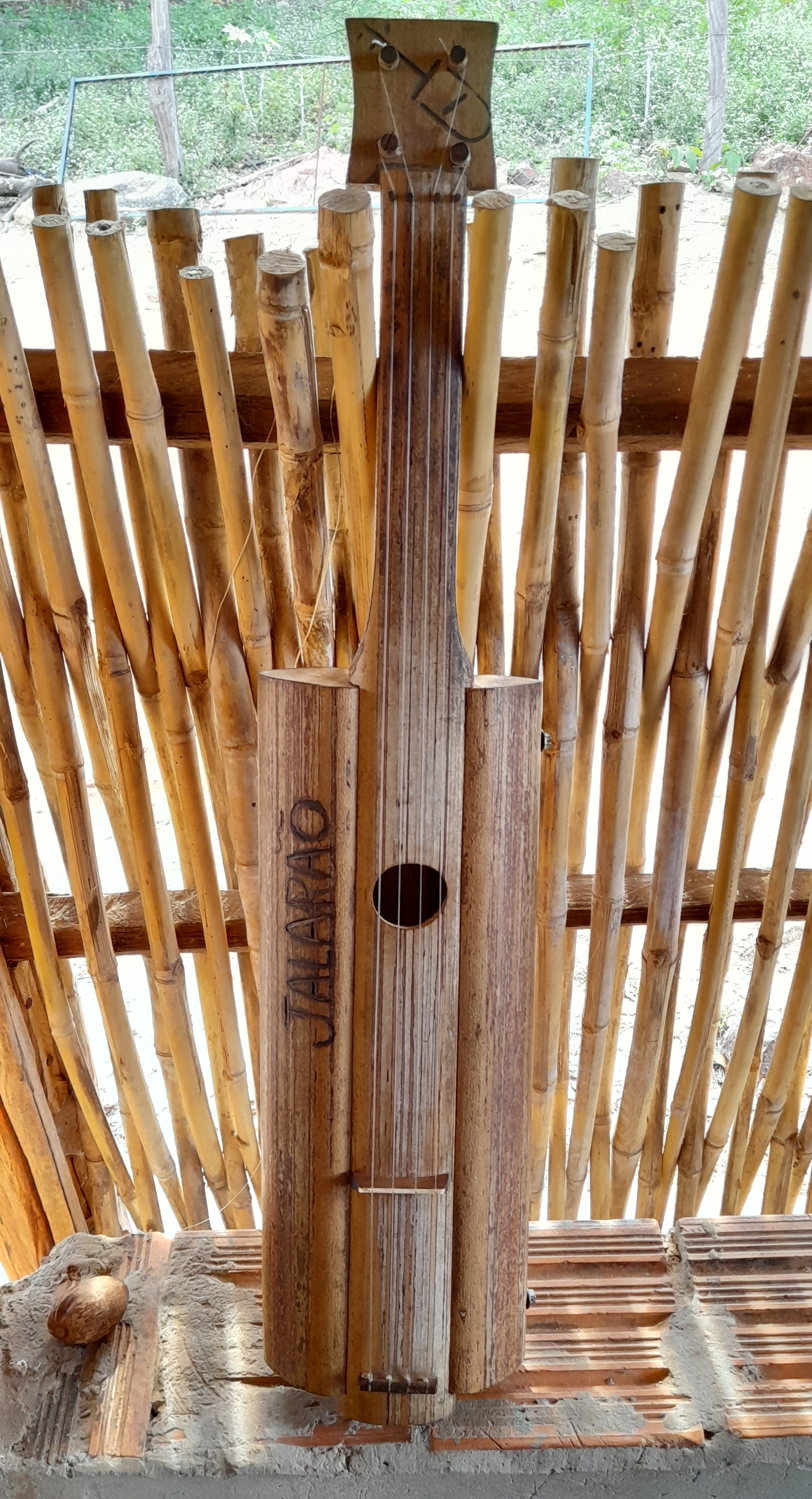
- A viola de buriti in the Mumbuca quilombo in Mateiros.

String instrument
- Classification: String instrument
- Hornbostel–Sachs classification: (Composite chordophone)

Related instruments
- Viola de cocho

The viola de buriti is a Brazilian stringed instrument made from the buriti palm tree. It is very lightweight, has four nylon strings and a tiny sound board and is fretless. It is found in the region of Jalapão in Tocantins and in northwest Minas Gerais.

The viola de buriti was one of the instruments featured in Brazil's Voa Viola Festival, which featured the diverse uses of the guitar in Brazilian music.
