= Inezita Barroso =

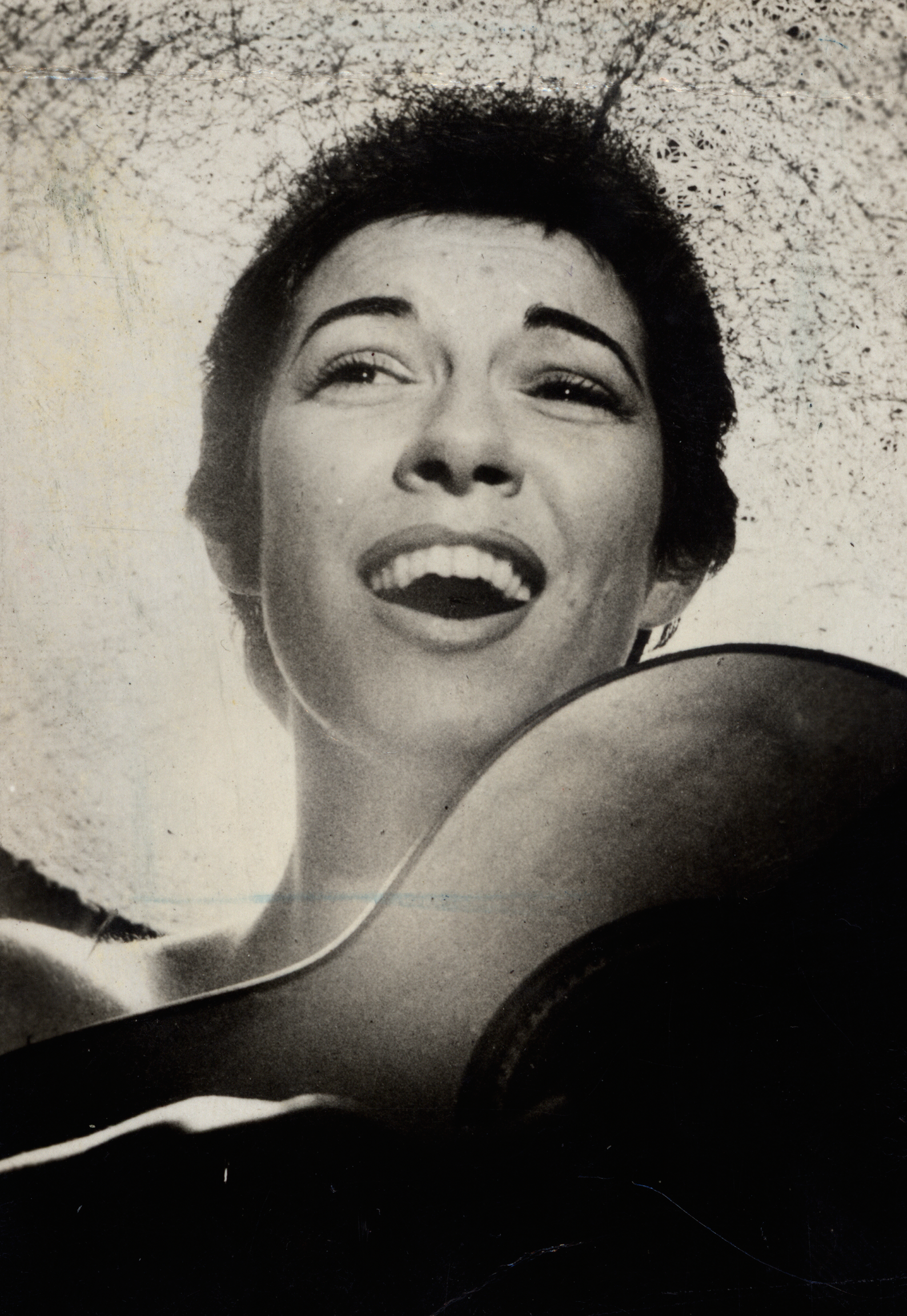
- Barroso in 1956

Background information
- Born: Ignez Magdalena Aranha de Lima; March 4, 1925; São Paulo, Brazil
- Died: March 8, 2015 (aged 90) São Paulo, Brazil
- Genres: Sertanejo
- Occupations: Singer, guitarist, actor, librarian, folklorist, teacher
- Instruments: Vocals, viola caipira
- Years active: 1951–2015
- Website: www.inezitabarroso.com.br

Ignez Magdalena Aranha de Lima Barroso (née Aranha de Lima; March 4, 1925 – March 8, 2015) was a Brazilian sertanejo singer, guitarist, actress, TV presenter, librarian, folklorist and teacher.

== Biography ==
Inês Madalena Aranha de Lima was born on March 4, 1925, in the Barra Funda neighborhood in the city of São Paulo. She started singing at the age of seven. At nine, she already admired the modernist poet Mário de Andrade, who lived next door to her house on Rua Lopes Chaves in Barra Funda, São Paulo, whom she hoped to spend every day while playing rollerblading. At age 11, she began to study piano.

Since she was a child, she knew Raul Torres who, having been his father's colleague on the Sorocabana Railroad, often went to his house, where they sang when she had her birthday.

Despite having been raised in the capital, Inezita had a real passion for country music. Her contact with nature was on weekends and when she spent her holidays at the house of relatives who lived in the countryside. She developed a taste for country music from an early age, but she faced harsh prejudices, because at the time singing and playing the viola was not an activity for women. The family was totally against it. Inezita studied Librarianship, as she had a true love of books

In the 40s, she married a man from Pernambuco and began her career singing folk songs collected by Mário de Andrade, at Rádio Clube do Recife. The name Inezita Barroso came from her name Inês, which was also her mother's name, and Barroso was her husband's last name.

She made her debut as an actress in the film "Ângela", by Tom Payne and Abílio Pereira de Almeida, in 1950, by Companhia Vera Cruz. In the same year, he debuted on Rádio Bandeirantes de São Paulo.

In 1951, she started working at Radio Record, where she presented in 1954 the program "Vamos Falar de Brasil". Still in 1951, she recorded her first album, performing "Funeral de um Rei Nagô", by Hekel Tavares and Murilo Araújo, and also "Curupira", by Waldemar Henrique. In 1953, she recorded "O Canto do Mar" and "Maria do Mar", by Guerra Peixe and José Mauro de Vasconcelos. In the same year, she recorded two of her greatest hits, the fashion "Marvada Pinga", by Cunha Jr., and the samba "Ronda", by Paulo Vanzolini. Also in 1953, she participated in the films "Destino em Apuros", by Ernesto Remani and "Mulher de Verdade", by Alberto Cavalcanti. With this film, she received the Saci Award, for best actress. In 1954, she recorded "Coco do Mané", by Luiz Vieira and began to present weekly programs about folklore on TV Record. She received the Roquette Pinto Award for best Brazilian popular radio singer, and the Guarani Award for best record singer. She participated in the films "É Proibido Beijar" by Ugo Lombardi and "O Craque" by José Carlos Burle. In 1955, Inezita recorded the songs in the public domain, "Meu Casório" and "Nhá Popé". In the same year, she participated as an actress and singer in the film "Carnaval em Lá Maior", by Adhemar Gonzaga, who represented Brazil at the Punta Del Este Festival in Uruguay. Also in 1955, she received the Saci Awards, as best actress, and Roquette Pinto, as best singer of Popular Music, with the album "Vamos Falar de Brasil".

On the LP "Inezita Presente", she recorded compositions by Babi de Oliveira, Juraci Silveira, Zica Bergami, Leyde Olivé and Edvina de Andrade, from São Paulo, Minas Gerais and Bahia folklore. In 1956, Barroso published the book "Roteiro de um Violão". In 1958, she recorded another of her greatest hits, the waltz "Lampião de Gás", by Zica Bergami and Hervé Cordovil. She also recorded the classic tune "Fiz a Cama na Varanda", by Dilu Melo and Ovídio Chaves. In 1960, she recorded, by Mariano da Silva and Cornélio Pires, the viola moda "Moda do Bonde Camarão", which became another great success of her career, and "Moda da Onça", from the folklore she collected.

In 1962, she left Record and began to face difficulties in making recordings, due to the intransigent maintenance of a line of work that she did not give up. In 1969, she received a trophy from the 1st South American Folklore Festival, in the city of Salinas, Uruguay. In the 1970s, she dedicated herself to traveling, conducting musical research, in addition to holding recitals throughout the country and recording for special programs for several countries, including the Soviet Union, Israel and the United States.

In 1970, she made a documentary that represented Brazil at Exposition 70, in Japan. In 1972, Inezita released the second volume of "Clássicos da Música Caipira", in which she performed, among others, "Rio de Lágrimas", by Piraci, Lourival dos Santos and Tião Carreiro, "Divino Espírito Santo", by Canhotinho and Torrinha, "Destinos Iguais", by Capitão Furtado and Laureano and "Rei do Café", by Teddy Vieira and Carreirinho. In 1975 she recorded the album "Inezita de Todos os Cantos", in which she sang candomblé songs, anonymous sambas from Rio de Janeiro and Niterói, folkloric numbers from Mato Grosso, as well as compositions "Negrinho do Pastoreio", by Barbosa Lessa and "Asa Branca", by Luiz Gonzaga and Humberto Teixeira. From 1980 onwards, he began to present the program "Viola Minha Viola", on Sundays, on TV Cultura of São Paulo. At the same time, he held recitals and conferences throughout Brazil, in addition to performing with Oswaldinho do Accordion in shows for the Pixinguinha Project. In 1985, she was honored by the Escola de Samba Oba-Oba, from Barueri, in São Paulo, which sang her life and work in a carnival plot. In the same year, after five years without recording, she released the LP "Inezita Barroso: A Incomparável" on the independent label Líder, whose repertoire was chosen by fans. During this period, she presented the program "Mutirão" on Rádio Universidade de São Paulo for five years. From 1990 onwards, and for nine years, she presented the program "Estrela da Manhã" on Rádio Cultura AM, from five to seven in the morning. In 1996, she recorded the CD "Voz e Viola" with guitar player Roberto Corrêa, in which she performed, among others, "Flor do Cafezal", by Luiz Carlos Paraná, "Perfil de São Paulo", by Bezerra de Menezes, "Tamba- tajá", by Waldemar Henrique, "Chalana", by Mário Zan and Arlindo Pinto and "Romaria", by Renato Teixeira. Also with Roberto Correia, she recorded the CD "Caipira de Fato", in 1997, interpreting, among others, "A Coisa Tá Feia" and "A Viola eo Violeiro", by Tião Carreiro and Lourival dos Santos, "Siriema", by Mário Zan and Nhô Pai and "Adeus Campina da Serra", by Cornélio Pires and Raul Torres. In the same year, she received the Sharp Award for Best Regional Singer.

She became known as "The Queen of Folklore" and is identified with what many define as "genuine country music".

Inezita Barroso presented the traditional program "Viola Minha Viola" on TV Cultura of São Paulo, for 34 1/2 years. She performed in the third edition of the program, and from then on she started to lead the presentation of the program alongside Moraes Sarmento.

In her glorious career, Inezita has recorded more than 60 discs recorded between 78 rpm, LPs, compacts and CDs. In 2009 she released her latest work, entitled "Sonho de Caboclo", and in 2013 she released her first DVD. Four books were released telling her life. The first by the name "A Menina Inezita Barroso" by Assis Ângelo, released in 2011, the second of the Official Press Applause Series by the title "Com a Espada e a Viola na Mão" by Valdemar Jorge, released in 2012, the third released in 2013 with the title "Inezita Barroso – A História de uma Brasileira", by Arley Pereira, and the fourth released in 2014, with the title "Inezita Barroso – Rainha da Música Caipira", by Carlos Eduardo Oliveira.

As an actress, she acted in nine films: "Angela" in 1950, "Destino em Apuros" and "Mulher de Verdade" in 1953, "O Craque" and "É Proibido Beijar" in 1954, "Carnival in A Major" in 1955, "O Preço da Vitória" in 1956, "Isto é São Paulo" in 1970, and "Desejo Violento" in 1978.

There have been countless hits over the years, including "Marvada Pinga" and "Lampião de Gás".

Inezita was admitted into Hospital Sírio-Libanês, in São Paulo, at February 19, 2015, due to respiratory failure, and died at March 8, just four days after her 90th anniversary.

== Marriage ==
She was married to Adolfo Cabral Barroso from 1947 until his death in 2006; the couple had one child.

== Discography ==
=== Studio albums ===
- 1955 – Lá Vem o Brasil (Copacabana)
- 1955 – Coisas do Meu Brasil (RCA Victor)
- 1955 – Inezita Barroso (Copacabana)
- 1955 – Danças Gaúchas (Copacabana)
- 1958 – Vamos Falar de Brasil (Copacabana)
- 1959 – Canto da Saudade (Copacabana)
- 1960 – Eu me Agarro na Viola (Copacabana)
- 1961 – Inezita Barroso Interpreta Danças Gaúchas (Copacabana)
- 1961 – Inezita Barroso Interpreta Músicas Gaúchas, Volume, 2 (Copacabana)
- 1961 – Inezita Barroso (Copacabana)
- 1962 – Clássicos da Música Caipira (Copacabana)
- 1962 – Recital de Inezita Barroso (Coacabana)
- 1964 – A Moça e a Banda (Copacabana)
- 1966 – Vamos Falar de Brasil, Novamente (Copacabana)
- 1969 – Recital Número 2 (Copacabana)
- 1970 – Moinhas (Copacabana)
- 1972 – Clássicos da Música Caipira, Volume 2 (Copacabana)
- 1972 – Inezita Barroso (Copacabana)
- 1975 – Modas e Canções (Copacabana)
- 1975 – Inezita Barroso em Todos os Cantos (Copacabana)
- 1977 – Seleção de Ouro (Copacabana)
- 1977 – Inezita Barroso (SOM)
- 1978 – Jóia da Música Sertaneja (Copacabana)
- 1979 – Inezita Barroso e Evandro e Seu Regional (Copacabana)
- 1980 – Jóias da Música Sertaneja (Copacabana)
- 1985 – A Incoparável, 30 Anos de Carreira (LIDER)
- 1992 – Memória da Música Brasileira (MOVIEPLAY)
- 1993 – Alma Brasileira (Copacabana)
- 1996 – Voz e Viola, Inezita Barroso e Roberto Corrêa (RGE)
- 1997 – Caipira de Fato, Inezita Barroso e Roberto Corrêa (RGE)
- 1999 – Sou Mais Brasil (CPC UMES)
- 2000 – Perfil de São Paulo, Inezia Barroso e Izaias e seus Chorões (Inter CD Records)
- 2000 – Ronda (Revivendo)
- 2001 – A Música Brasileira Desde Séculos Por Seus Autores e Intérpretes (SESC)
- 2003 – Hoje Relembrando (Trama)
- 2006 – Inezita Barroso e Roberto Corrêa – Globo Rural (Som Livre)
- 2009 – Sonho de Caboclo
- 2010 – Viola Minha Viola – Sucessos da Música Sertaneja, Vol.1 (Atração)
- 2010 – Viola Minha Viola – Sucessos da Música Sertaneja, Vol.2 (Atração)
- 2011 – O Brasil de Inezita Barroso (Copacabana)

=== Compilation albums ===
- 1998 – Raízes Sertanejas, Vol.1 (EMI)
- 1999 – Raízes Sertanejas, Vol.2 (EMI)
- 2000 – Bis Sertanejo
- 2011 – Sucessos Inesquecíveis do Vinil, Vol.1
- 2011 – Sucessos Inesquecíveis do Vinil, Vol.2

== Filmography ==
=== DVDs ===
- 1991 – Ensaio
- 2007 – Viola Minha Viola
- 2010 – Inezita Barroso – Roda Viva
- 2013 – Cabocla eu Sou
- 2013 – Inezita Barroso – Trajetória
- 2014 – Inezita Barroso – Voz e Viola

=== Feature films ===
- 1950 – Ângela
- 1953 – Destino em Apuros
- 1953 – Mulher de Verdade
- 1954 – O Craque
- 1954 – É Proibido Beijar
- 1955 – Carnaval em Lá Maior
- 1956 – O Preço da Vitória
- 1970 – Isto é São Paulo
- 1978 – Desejo Violento

== See also ==
- Viola caipira
- Braz da Viola
