= Braz da Viola =

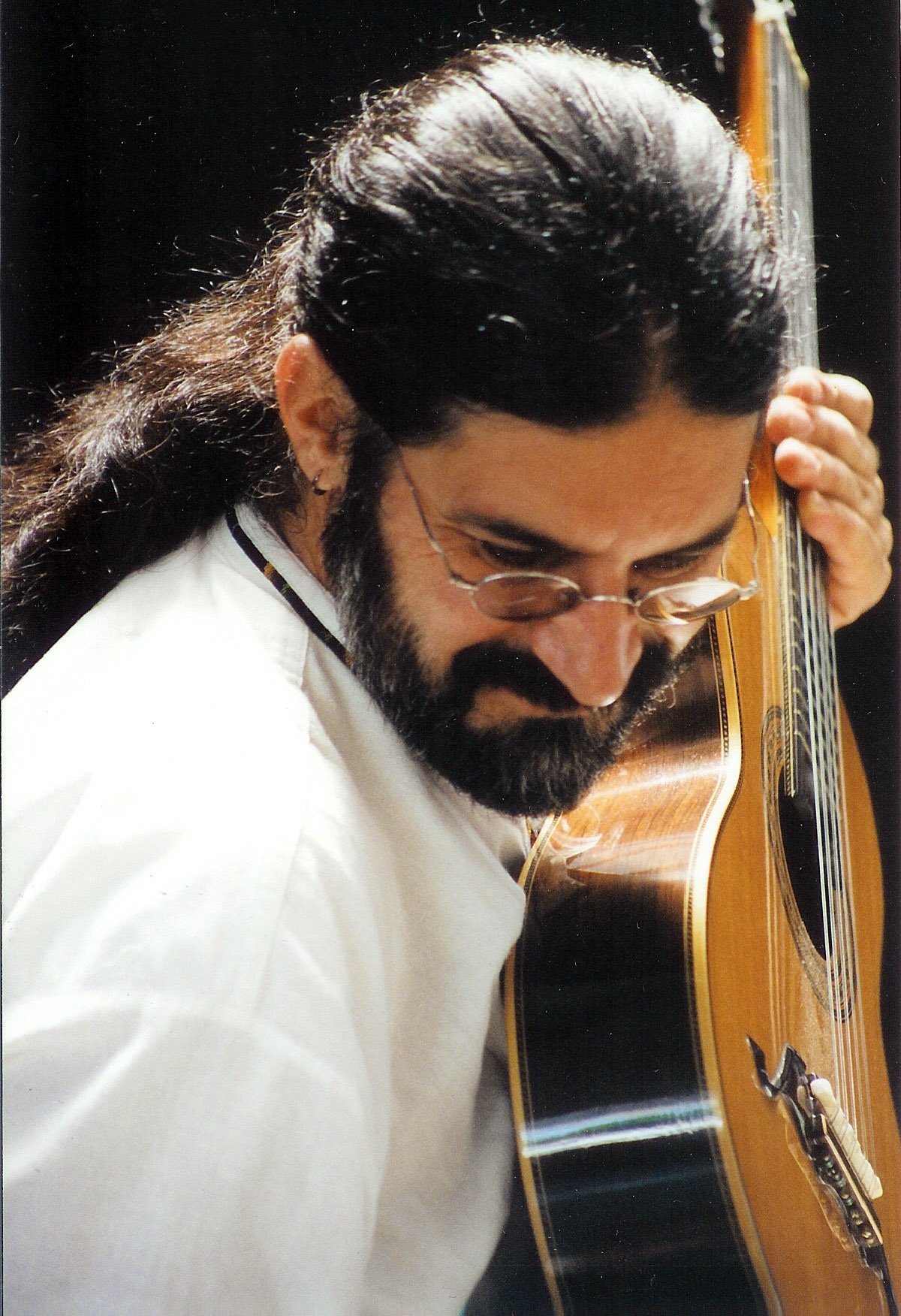
- Braz da Viola with a viola caipira

Background information
- Birth name: Braz Roberto da Costa
- Born: 1961 (age 63–64)
- Origin: Minas Gerais, Brazil
- Occupation(s): Musician, Teacher, Researcher
- Instrument: Viola caipira
- Labels: Independent
- Website: www.brazdaviola.com.br

Braz Roberto da Costa (born 1961), known professionally as Braz da Viola, is a Brazilian multi-instrumentalist musician, luthier, conductor and teacher. He runs workshops of viola caipira in several cities in Brazil. He played with several guitar players in Brazil, such as Roberto Corrêa, Paulo Freire, Renato Andrade, Pereira da Viola, Ivan Vilela and dual Zé Mulato and Cassiano. He worked with Inezita Barroso, when the singer appeared accompanied by the Orquestra de Viola Caipira de São José dos Campos.

== Biography ==
He began playing guitar at age 15. He was introduced to the guitar by his uncle, Braz Aparecido, broadcaster and composer, who has recorded works by Tonic and Tinoco, Vieira and Vieirinha and Liu and Léu. He learned to play guitar with Dean Barioni. In 1991, he founded the Orquestra de Viola Caipira de São José dos Campos in order to publicize and popularize the viola caipira and also to organize viola players. He is conductor of that orchestra. In 1999, he developed works for the dissemination and popularization of the viola with the Orchestra Viola de Coité. That same year he founded "Viola Serena" in Itamonte - MG. In August 2006, he was one of Brazil's representatives at the Festival of World Cultures in Dublin, Ireland.

== Lutenist ==
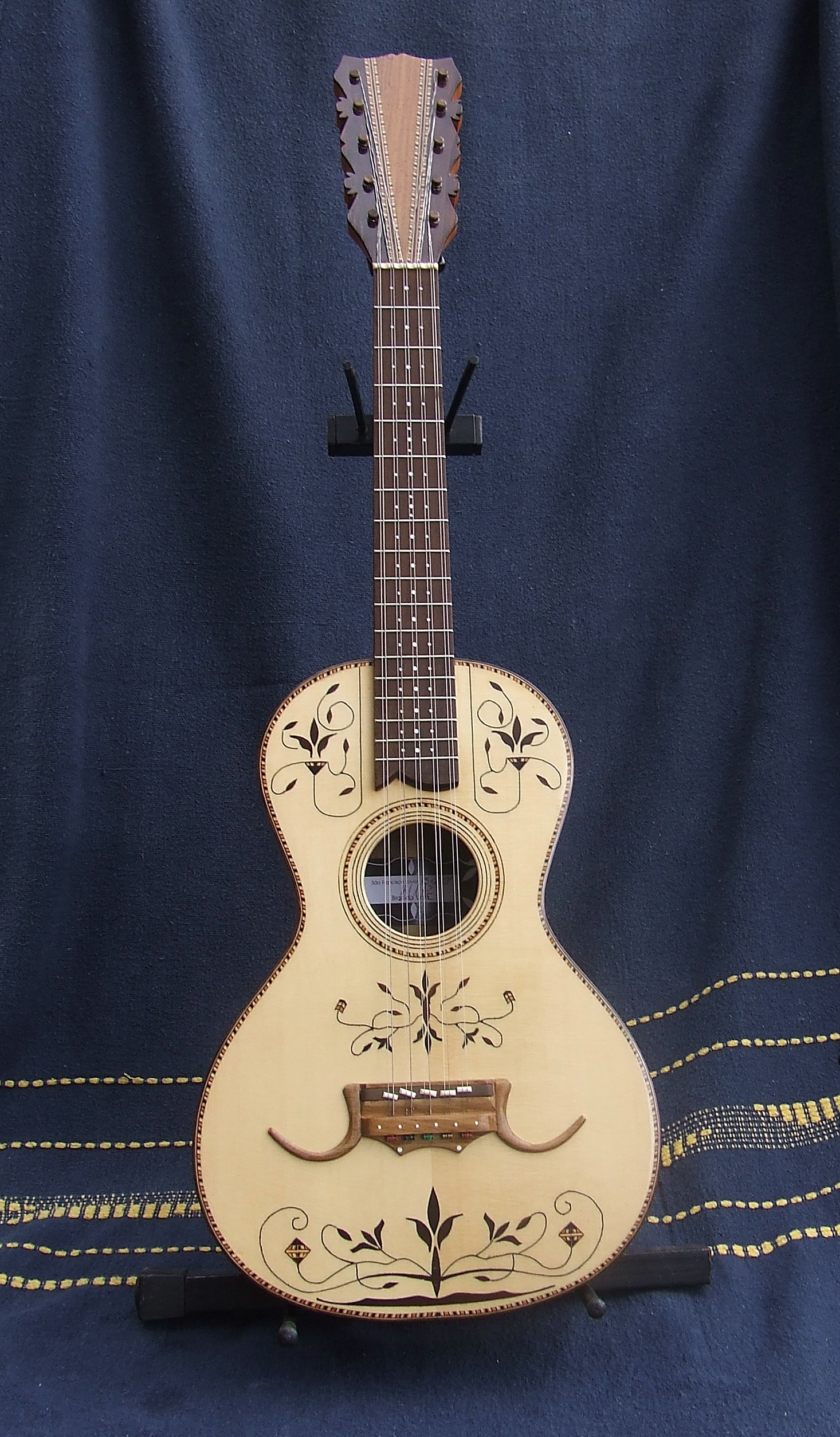
Viola caipira with fine marquetry work (Braz da Viola)

He learned the craft of building viola caipira from Renato Vieira, factory of violas Xadrez. In 1994, deployed two lutenist of viola workshops in Sao Jose dos Campos and São Francisco Xavier. Currently he is building violas de cocho in his own atelier, a typical instrument of the Brazilian Pantanal.

== Discography ==
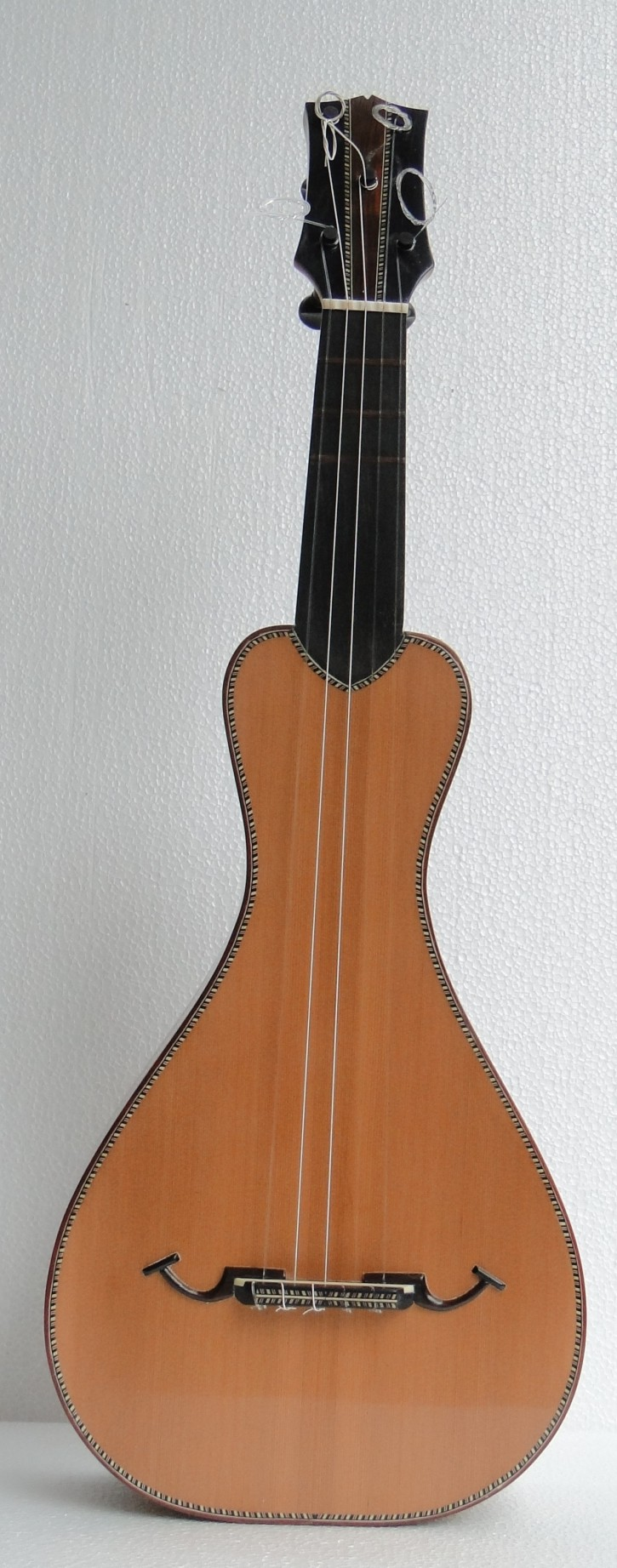
Viola-de-Cocho made by Braz da Viola

- 1994 - Paraiba vivo, o rio da minha terra - with the Orquesta de Viola Caipira
- 1995 - Modas e violas do vale - with the Orquesta de Viola Caipira
- 1996 - Crisálida - with Roberto Corrêa and Orquestra Juvenil
- 1997 - Clarão do luar
- 1998 - Violeiros do Brasil - Various artists
- 1998 - Feito na Roça - with the Orquesta de Viola Caipira
- 2000 - Festa no Lugar - with the Orquesta de Viola Caipira
- 2001 - Florescê
- 2001 - Viola de Coité - with the Orquesta de Viola Caipira from Londrina
