= Egil Jevanord =

Norwegian footballer (1918-2000)

Personal information
- Date of birth: 3 July 1918
- Date of death: 3 April 2000 (aged 81)

International career
Years	Team	Apps	(Gls)
1945–1947	Norway	5	(0)

Egil Jevanord (3 July 1918 – 3 April 2000) was a Norwegian footballer. He played in five matches for the Norway national football team from 1945 to 1947.
