= Viola de cocho =

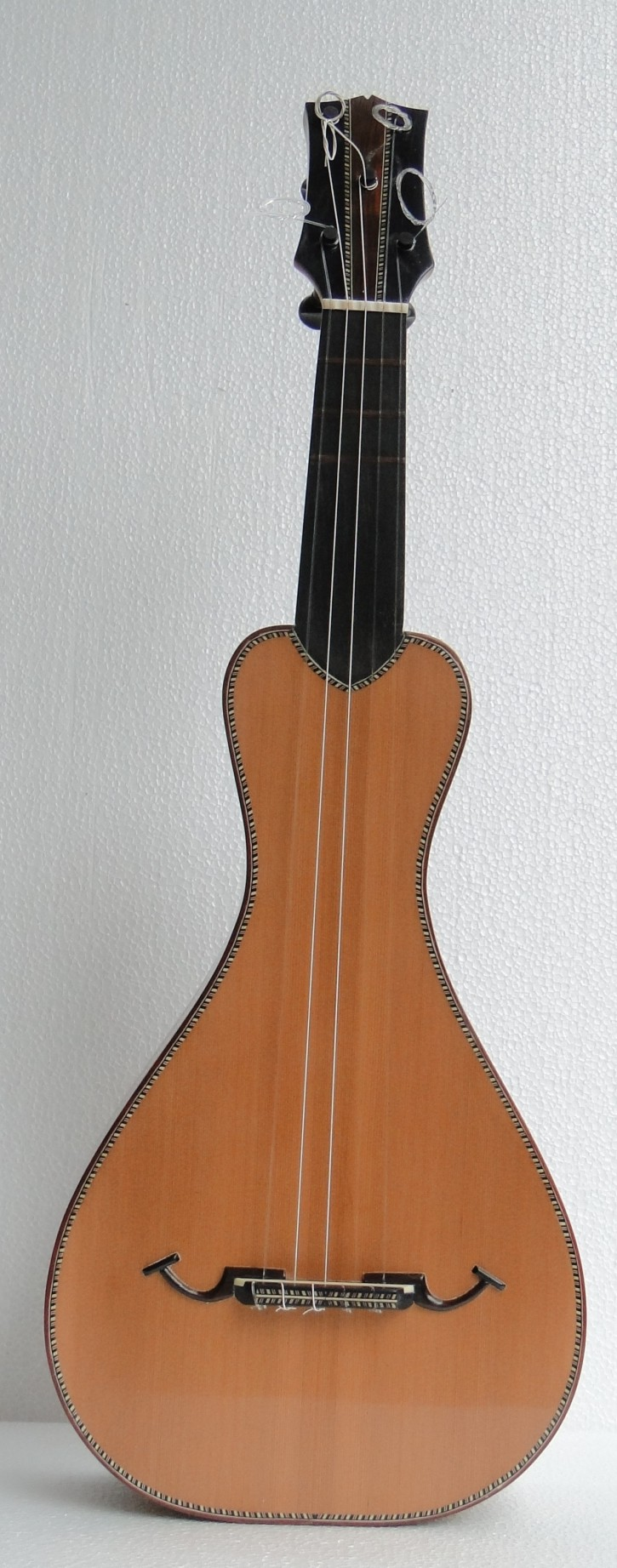
- Viola de Cocho made by Braz da Viola

String instrument
- Classification: String instrument
- Hornbostel–Sachs classification: (Composite chordophone)
- Developed: Mato Grosso, Brazil.

Related instruments
- Viola caipira, Mejoranera, Viola De Buriti

The viola de cocho is a singular plucked string instrument from Brazil. It is typical in the states of Mato Grosso and Mato Grosso do Sul and has been designated a part of Brazil's intangible national heritage by IPHAN, the Brazilian institution responsible for the preservation of the national cultural heritage. It is unusual in that although it has only three frets at most and is left unvarnished. The Portuguese word cocho, used by farm labourers, refers to a hollowed-out log forming a sort of container. The cocho is widely used, for example, to provide salt for cattle on grassland farms.

== Design ==
The viola-de-cocho is a musical instrument of the group of short lutes, produced by master craftsmen. After choosing the wood, cut the trunk into two flat parts. With a cast the wood is scratch and on which is carved a sounding board. Once carved the body of the instrument, the soundboard is glued and then the bridge, fingerboard and pegs are placed, and, finally, the frets and strings. Some instruments have a small circular hole on top, sometimes not. The viola without hole is something new. Some viola players justified that the viola with hole gave a lot of work, because always came by this hole, spiders or other animals, damaging the instrument's sound. Some former viola players prefer it to the hole because, in the words of one, the hole gives a better sound.

== Gallery ==
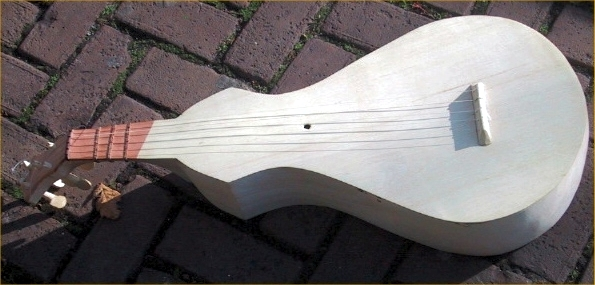
A traditional viola de cocho

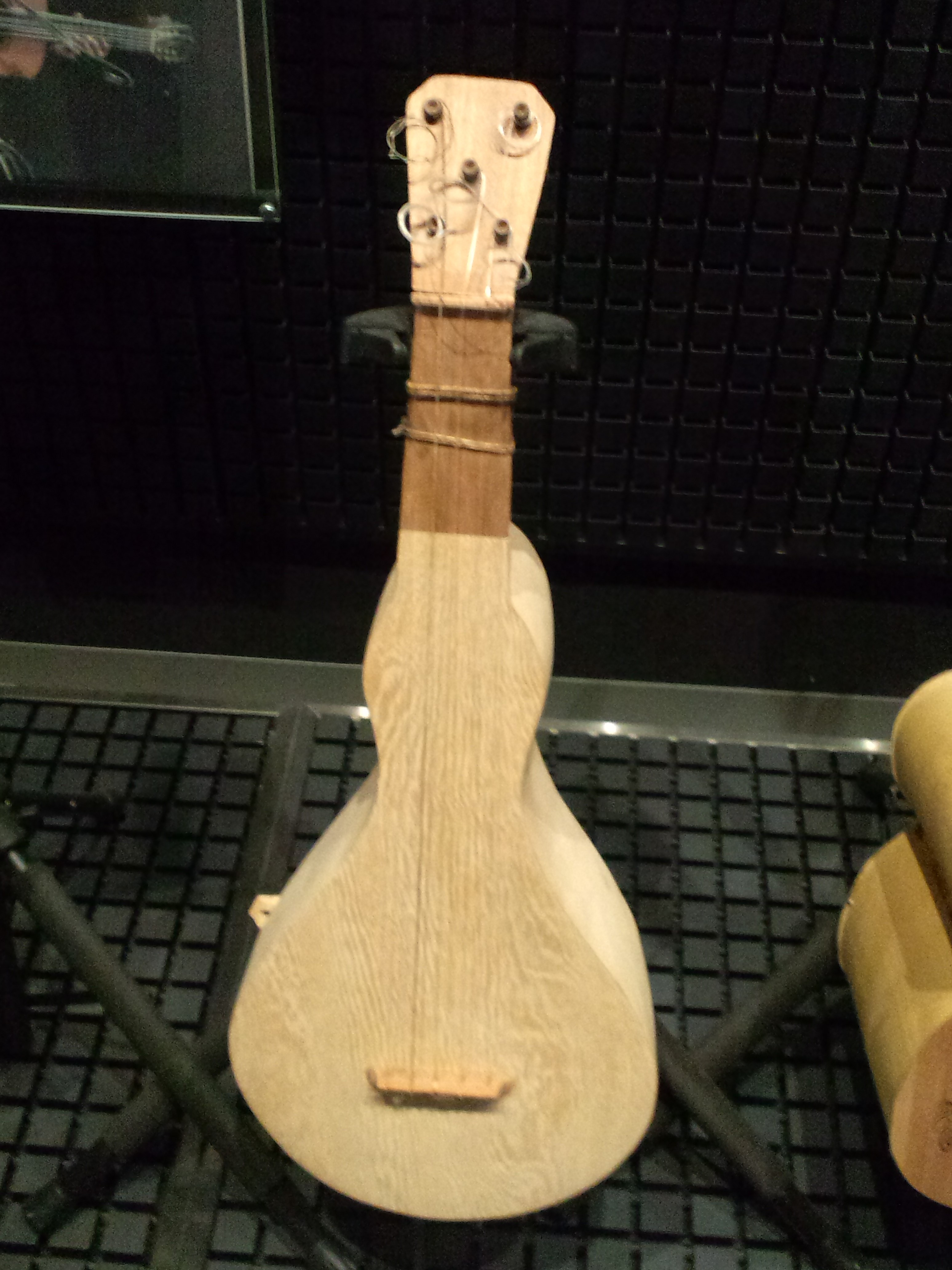
Viola de cocho in a museum in Osaka, Japan.

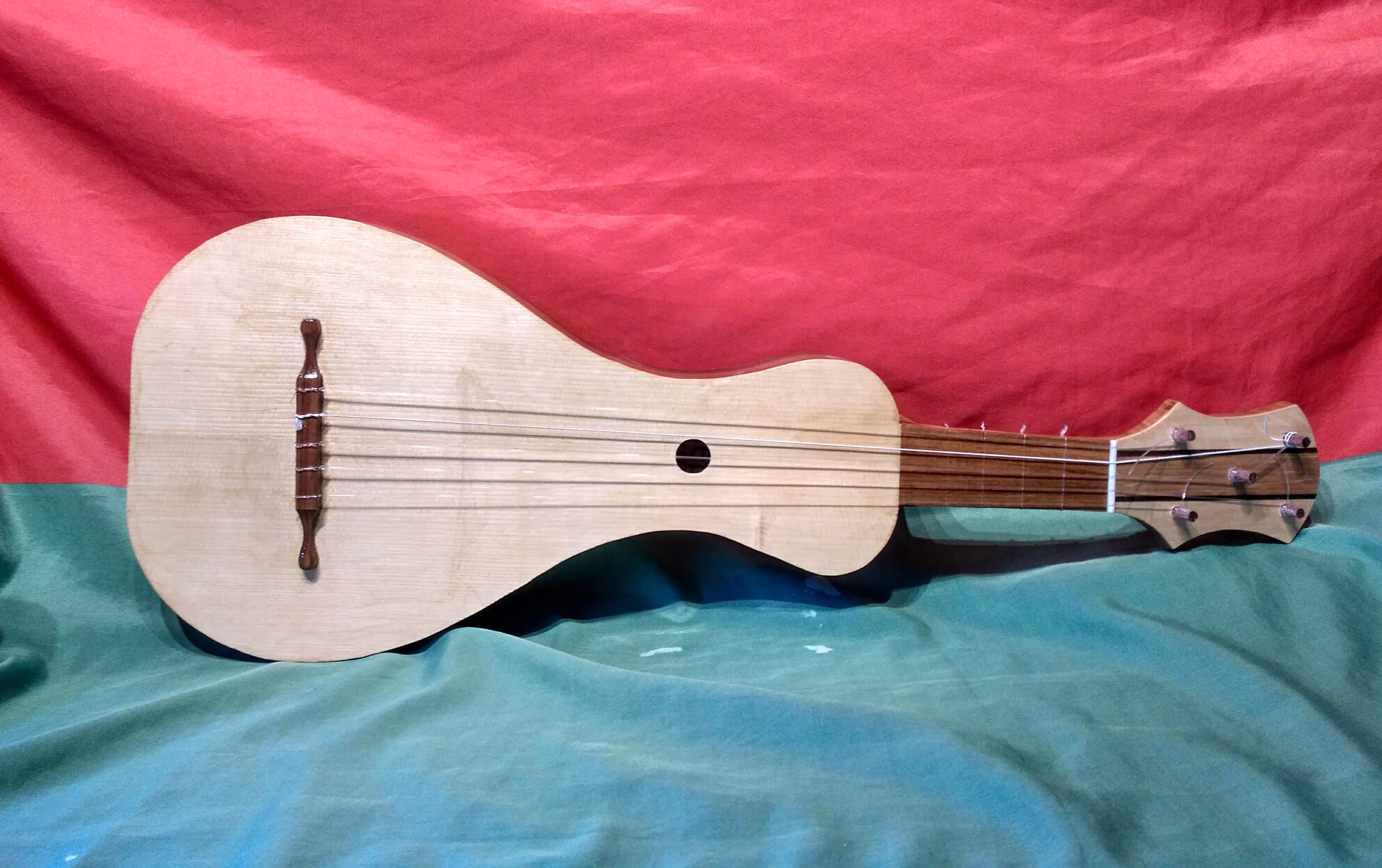
Viola de cocho, Front view.

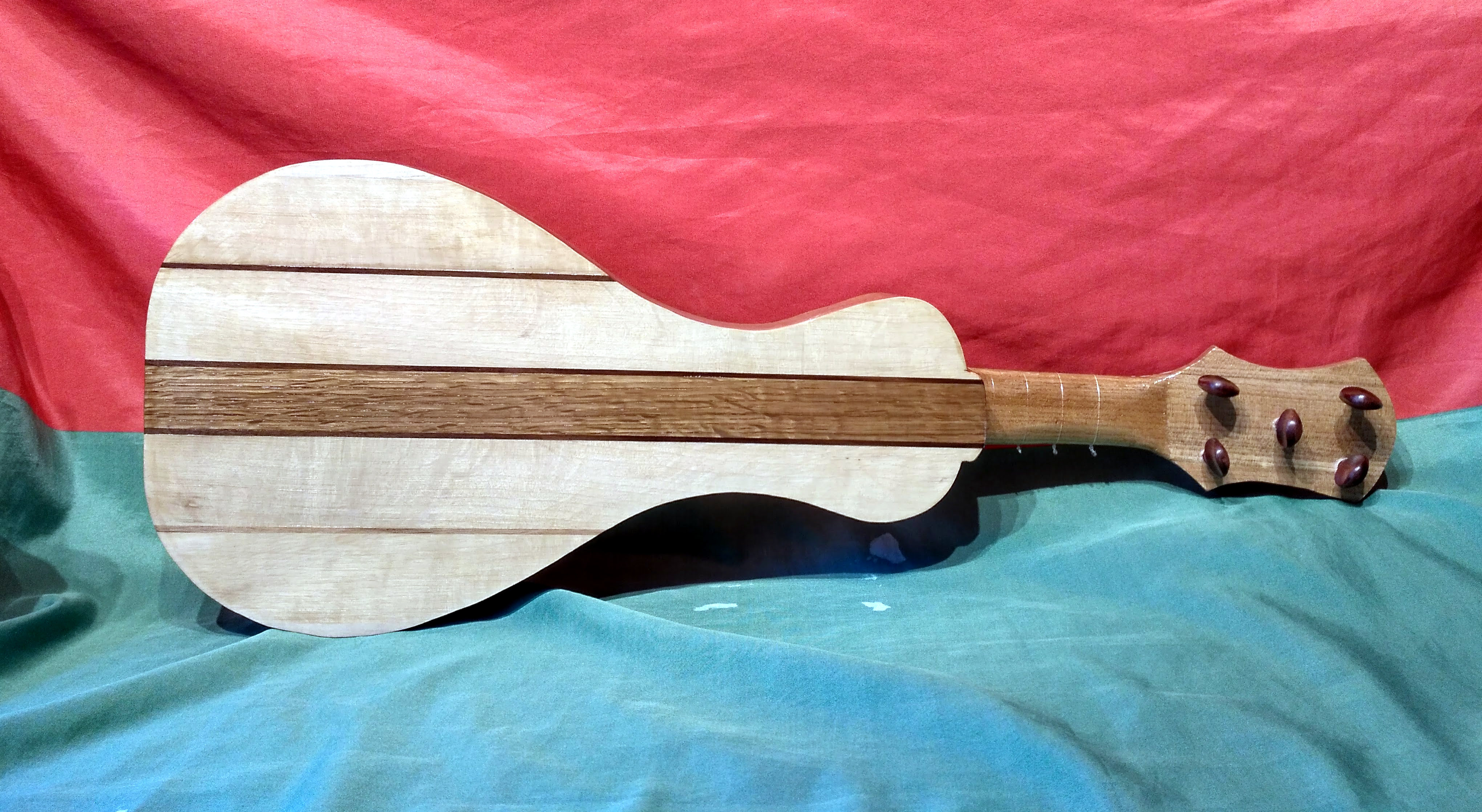
Viola de cocho, Back view.

== Tuning ==
With unique shape and sound, the viola-de-cocho has always five orders of strings, called prima, contra, corda do meio, canotio and resposta. The strings are tuned in two different ways, canotio solto (open) and canotio preso (stopped): bottom-up, re, la, mi, re, sol, and re, la, mi, do, sol.

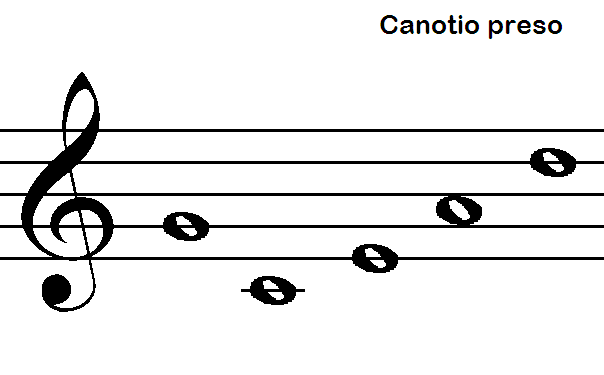
canotio preso

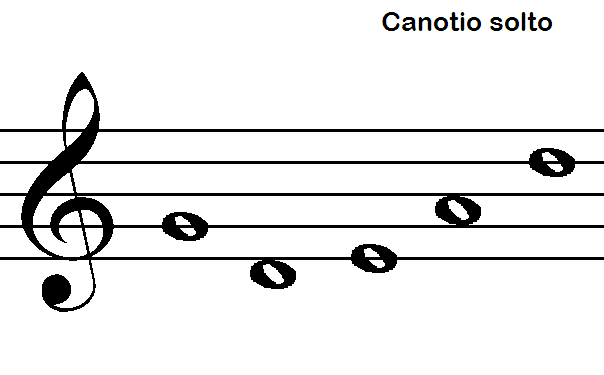
canotio solto

(Tunings sound one octave below than notated.)

== Notable performers ==
Braz da Viola, besides being a virtuoso instrumentalist is also a maker of beautiful violas-de-cocho. Another well known performer of the viola-de-cocho is the Brazilian instrumentalist Roberto Corrêa.

== See also ==
- Viola caipira
- Braz da Viola
