= Bill Lynn =

American baseball player

- Pitcher
- Born: August 22, 1921; Cleveland County, North Carolina, U.S.
- Died: April 30, 2000 (aged 78); The Bronx, New York, U.S.
- Threw: Left

Negro league baseball debut
- 1943, for the Homestead Grays

Last appearance
- 1943, for the Homestead Grays

Teams
- Homestead Grays (1943)

William Henry Lynn (August 22, 1921 – April 30, 2000) was an American Negro league pitcher in the 1940s.

A native of Cleveland County, North Carolina, Lynn attended North Carolina A&T State University and played for the Homestead Grays in 1943. He died in Bronx, New York in 2000 at age 78.
