= Edouard Siegrist =

Swiss field hockey player

Personal information
- Nationality: Swiss
- Born: 13 December 1923
- Died: 30 April 2000 (aged 76)

Sport
- Sport: Field hockey

Edouard Siegrist (13 December 1923 – 30 April 2000) was a Swiss field hockey player. He competed in the men's tournament at the 1948 Summer Olympics.
