= Eli Coppola =

American poet (1961–2000)

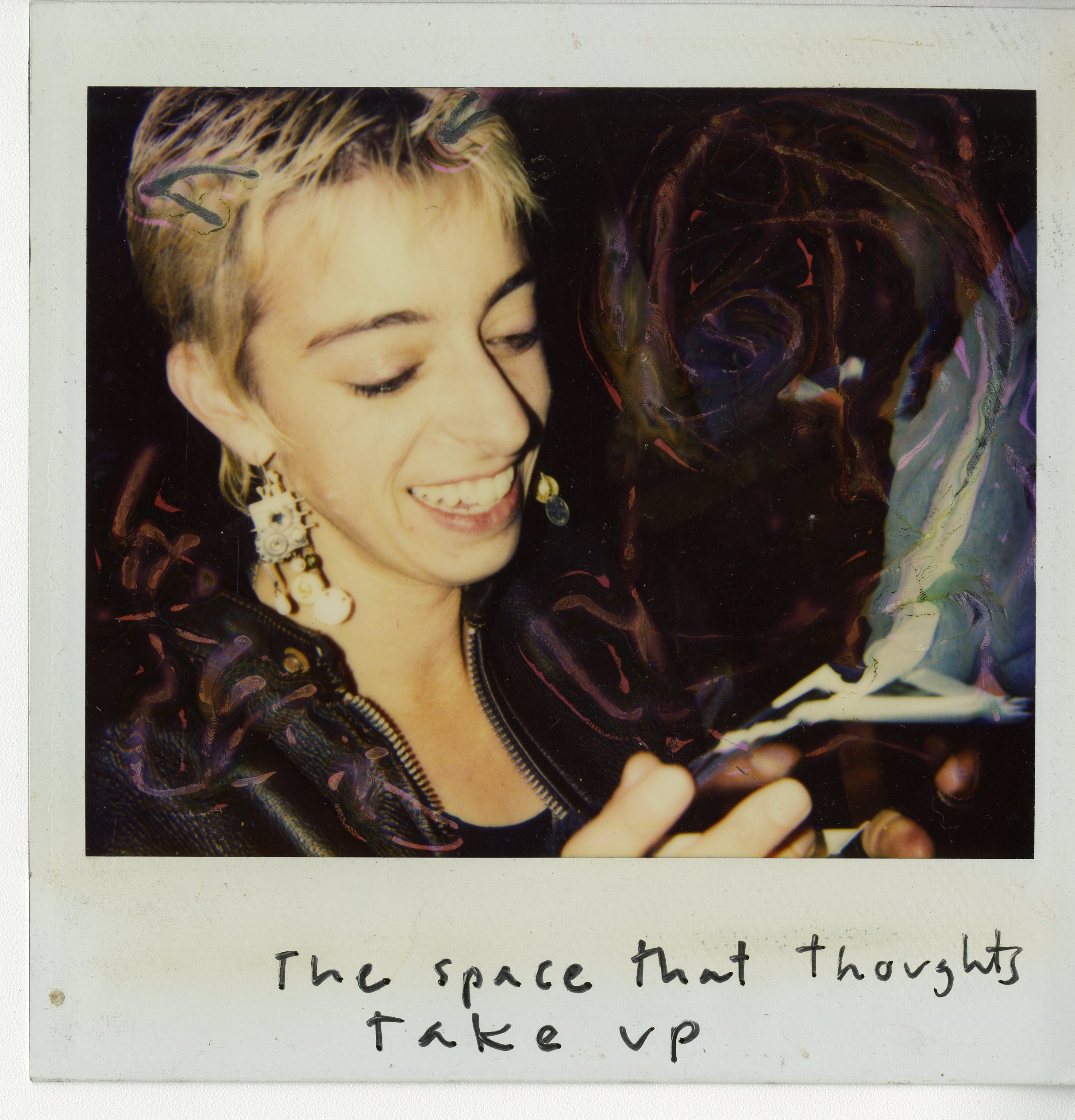
- Polaroid photo of Eli in 1992, captioned by Eli
- Born: November 13, 1961
- Died: April 2, 2000 (aged 38); San Francisco, California, u.S.
- Education: Connecticut College (BA); San Francisco State University (MFA)
- Occupation: Poet

JoAnn Elizabeth "Eli" Coppola (November 13, 1961 – April 2, 2000) was an American poet and active contributor to the San Francisco spoken word scene in the mid 1980s and 1990s. She wrote poetry on a variety of subjects including disability, sexuality, and social injustice.

== Early life and education ==
Coppola was diagnosed with muscular dystrophy in her early 20s. She grew up in Hamden, Connecticut and graduated cum laude with a B.A. in English from Connecticut College in 1983.

== Career ==
After graduating from Connecticut College, Coppola moved to San Francisco in 1985 where she entered the Bay Area poetry scene with readings at Cafe Babar. Coppola was one of the most popular and beloved poets who found voice at the Cafe Babar readings. Her work set a standard for genuine emotion among the raucous spoken word scene of 1980s San Francisco. In the late 80s and early 90s, Coppola worked at the UC Berkeley Women's Studies Program as June Jordan's assistant. Coppola received her MFA from San Francisco State University in 1994. Coppola published five chapbooks of her poetry; Animals We Keep in the City (Zeitgeist Press, 1989), Invisible Men's Voices (Blue Beetle Press, 1992), As Luck Would Have It (Zeitgeist Press, 1993), no straight lines between no two points (Apathy Press Poets, 1993), and Anyway (Monkey Business Books, 1999).

== Death and legacy ==
On April 2, 2000, Coppola died of a heart attack in her San Francisco apartment. After her death, Coppola's family worked with her agent, David West, to publish a collection of her chapbook poetry in Some Angels Wear Black (Manic D Press, 2005) and the poetry recordings Eli Coppola: Some Words (2000) and Flying at Cafe Babar: Readings (live) by Eli Coppola (2006). In 2009, Michelle Tea and Ali Liebegott of Sister Spit and Radar Productions founded the Annual Eli Coppola Poetry Chapbook Prize for new poets. In 2014, Coppola was awarded a Kathy Acker Award for lifetime achievement and outstanding contribution to the avant garde arts community. She was remembered by the San Francisco Gate as, "An incredibly respected and adored member of the city's poetry community, Coppola was known for her gorgeous and unsentimental poems, many dealing with her muscular dystrophy."

== Awards and honors ==
While at Connecticut College, Coppola won the 1983 Charles B. Palmer Prize of the Academy of American Poets and the 1983 Nancy Rockmaker Memorial Prize.

== Selected works ==
=== Publications ===
- Animals We Keep in the City (Zeitgeist Press, 1989)
- Invisible Men's Voices (Blue Beetle, 1992)
- As Luck Would Have It (Zeitgeist Press, 1993)
- no straight lines between no two points (1993)
- Anyway (Monkey Business Books, 1999)
- Some Angels Wear Black (Manic D Press, 2005)

=== Recordings ===
- Eli Coppola: Some Words (2000)
- Flying at Cafe Babar: Readings (live) by Eli Coppola (Zeitgeist Press, 2006)
