= Gail O'Rourke =

American volleyball player (1942-2000)

Personal information
- Born: December 23, 1942; New York. United States
- Died: April 3, 2000 (aged 57); Honolulu, Hawaii, United States

Gail O'Rourke Wong (December 23, 1942 – April 3, 2000) was a volleyball player. She played for the United States national team at the 1964 Summer Olympics and was an All-American at Marymount College in Los Angeles.
