= Università Cattolica del Sacro Cuore Library =

University library in Milan

- Location: Milan, Italy
- Established: 1921

Access and use
- Access requirements: depends on library

Other information
- Website: www.unicatt.it/biblioteche/sbda-home

The Università Cattolica del Sacro Cuore Library was established (founded) in 1921 by Agostino Gemelli, who based its design and organisation on that of highly prestigious foreign libraries. All the libraries of the four UCSC campuses (Milan, Brescia, Piacenza-Cremona and Rome) use a centralized general catalogue.

== History ==
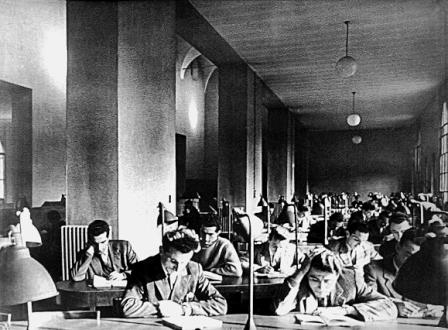
Library in 1930

The library of the Milan office, present since the founding of the university in 1921 with capital of 50,000 volumes, is the largest and oldest of the libraries of the whole university.

The library of Milan boasts in its library also numerous special funds. The collection consists of Sumerian tablets, Egyptian papyri (Papyrus 88), an original diploma of Matilde di Canossa (9 January 1106), a group of 30 manuscripts, an incunabulum, 60 books printed in the 16th century and a collection of 18th- and 19th-century editions of literature and historiography, the first edition of Alessandro Manzoni's novel The Betrothed.

== Libraries in the UCSC system ==
The library consists of a central library with deposit, 8 branch libraries (located at institutes and departments), some special libraries, the reference room "Joseph Billanovich" and 12 reading rooms.

Branch libraries

- Library in the Gregorianum building - first floor (Classical philology and papyrology - Ancient history - Archaeology and history of Greek and Roman art - Medieval, humanistic and Renaissance studies - Italian studies)
- Library in the Gregorianum building - second floor (Medieval History - Modern and contemporary history - Political sciences - English and French languages and literature - Religious sciences - Palaeography - United Nations publications)
- Library in the Gregorianum building - third floor (Philosophy - German, Spanish, Slavic languages and literature - Public and industrial law)
- Library in the Gregorianum building - fourth floor (Law)
- Media Library in the Gregorianum building - ground floor (New media)
- Library in the Franciscanum building - lower ground floor (Pedagogy, Psychology, Sociology, Ethnology, Geography - Family studies and research - Fashion centre)
- Library in the Franciscanum building - ground floor (History of medieval and modern art - Linguistics)
- Library at Via Necchi 5 (Economic sciences, mathematics, statistics)

Other special libraries

- Negri da Oleggio Library (Negri da Oleggio and Silvio Cipriani Collections)
- Cinquecentine Room (Incunabula and Sixteenth-century works)
- United Nations publications Room
- Sport Sciences Library (at the academic center "Rino Fenaroli", viale Suzzani 279)
