= George E. Taylor (historian) =

American historian

George Edward Taylor (13 December 1905 – 14 April 2000) was a prolific and influential scholar of Chinese studies, professor at University of Washington, Seattle from 1939 to 1969, and director of the Far Eastern and Russian Institute (later the Henry Jackson School) at the University of Washington from 1946 to 1969. He became a naturalized U.S. citizen on May 11, 1943. He married Roberta Stevens White in 1933. She died in 1967. He married Florence R. Kluckhohn in 1968.

== Life and career ==
George Taylor was born in Coventry, England, on December 13, 1905, and received degrees in history and politics from the University of Birmingham before coming to the United States in 1928 on a Commonwealth Fund fellowship. After study at Johns Hopkins University and Harvard University, he studied in Peking from 1930 to 1932 on a fellowship from the Harvard-Yenching Institute. He began his long term interest in the mid 19th century Taiping Rebellion with an article which combined documentary research with social analysis. From 1933 to 1936, he was professor of international relations at the Central Political Institute in Nanking, then moved to teach at Yenching University in Beiping. While applying social analysis to the problems of the China of his day, he was among the group of scholars in Peking who exchanged ideas and advanced the study of Chinese history with new techniques, laying the groundwork for, among other projects the Chinese Dynastic Histories Project organized by Karl August Wittfogel and sponsored by the Institute of Pacific Relations. After war broke out in 1937, Taylor spent the summer of 1938 traveling with the Chinese Communist Eighth Route Army, and smuggled medical supplies to them. These experiences were the basis of his book, The Struggle for North China.

In 1939 Taylor became chair of the Department of Oriental Studies at the University of Washington, Seattle. He took leave in 1942 to become deputy director of the United States Office of War Information in charge of Pacific operations. Under his leadership the Foreign Morale Analysis Division recruited Clyde Kluckhohn, the Harvard anthropologist, and a team of twenty five others to study Japanese culture in order to formulate policy based on the best understanding. These studies included Ruth Benedict’s The Chrysanthemum and the Sword. After the war he was director of the Office of War Information at the United States State Department. Among the others who worked for Taylor were John Fairbank, who Taylor later criticized for failing to understand the dangers of Soviet Communism.

Back in Seattle in 1947, Professor Taylor contended that the decision to drop the atomic bombs on Japan had not been based on all the available evidence. It is essential for the future, he said, that the skills of social scientists be used in the formulation of key decisions. Under his leadership as director, the Far Eastern and Russia Institute was home to scholars such as Wittfogel, Franz H. Michael, Hsiao Kung-ch’uan, and Chu T’ung-tsu.

As the Chinese Communists gained the upper hand in China, Taylor was among the strongest voices condemning American policy and opposing diplomatic recognition of the new government. With his colleagues Wittfogel and Nicholas Poppe, Taylor testified before the McCarran Committee that the scholar and activist Owen Lattimore had acted in the interests of the Soviet Union and had not recognized the danger of Soviet expansionism. In addition to these scholarly and political activities, Taylor co-authored a standard survey text, The Far East in the Modern World, which went through three editions. In the 1960s he was a strong supporter of American policies in the Vietnam War.

He retired from the University of Washington in 1969, but turned to the promotion of trade, serving as president of the Washington Council on International Trade from 1976 to 1987.

== Major works ==
- George E. Taylor, The Struggle for North China (New York: International Secretariat Institute of Pacific Relations, 1940).
- - America in the New Pacific (New York: Macmillan 1942).
- -, Maxwell Slutz Stewart, et al., Changing China (St. Louis, Dallas, Institute of Pacific Relations, American Council, 1942).
- Franz H. Michael, George E. Taylor, The Far East in the Modern World (New York,: Holt, 1956; Hindsdale, Illinois: Dryden Press, 3rd, 1975).
