= Edward M. Dickson =

Massachusetts politician (1912–2000)

Member of the Massachusetts House of Representatives from the 38th Middlesex district
- In office 1965–1978

Personal details
- Born: March 12, 1912 Weston, Massachusetts, US
- Died: April 10, 2000 (aged 88) Weston, Massachusetts, US
- Education: Harvard College (BA); Harvard Business School (MBA)

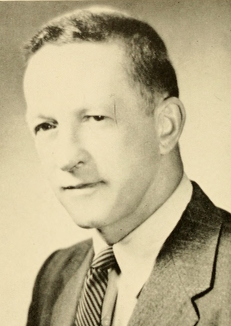
Portrait of Edward Dickson, member of the Massachusetts House of Representatives

Edward M. Dickson (March 12, 1912– April 10, 2000) was an American politician who was the member of the Massachusetts House of Representatives from the 38th Middlesex district.
