= Rainy Brown =

English cricketer

Personal information
- Full name: George Rainy Reynolds Brown
- Born: 8 December 1905; Maldon, Essex, England
- Died: 15 April 2000 (aged 94); Storrington, Sussex, England
- Batting: Right-handed
- Bowling: Left-arm orthodox spin
- Role: Bowler

Domestic team information
- Years: Team
- 1924–1932: Essex

Career statistics
Competition	FC
Matches	29
Runs scored	396
Batting average	11.64
100s/50s	0/0
Top score	38*
Balls bowled
Wickets	46
Bowling average	29.52
5 wickets in innings	1
10 wickets in match	0
Best bowling	5/55
Catches/stumpings	15/0
- Source: Cricinfo, 21 July 2013

George Rainy Reynolds Brown (8 December 1905 – 15 April 2000) was an English cricketer.

Brown played for Essex between 1924 and 1932 and for Cambridge University in 1925; he later played a few first-class matches in India.
