= Enzo Degani =

- Born: September 30, 1934; Terrazzo (VE), Veneto, Kingdom of Italy
- Died: April 23, 2000 (aged 65); Bologna, Emilia-Romagna, Italy
- Occupation: Classical scholar

Academic background
- Education: University of Padua
- Thesis: Αἰών. Da Omero ad Aristotele (1958)
- Doctoral advisor: Carlo Diano

Academic work
- Discipline: Classical philology
- Sub-discipline: Ancient Greek literature • textual criticism
- Institutions: University of Cagliari; University of Bologna

Enzo Degani (30 September 1934 – 23 April 2000) was an Italian classical philologist, Professor in Greek literature at the University of Bologna.

== Biography ==
Born in Terrazzo (Verona), from Garibaldi and Angelina Degani (née Pasquale), Enzo Degani studied at the liceo classico Pigafetta in Vicenza and enrolled at the University of Padua, initially in the Faculty of Classics, moving to Engineering for about a semester, and finally returning to Classics. He graduated in 1958, tutored by Carlo Diano. From 1959 to 1969 he was assistant professor in Greek literature at the University of Cagliari. From 1965 to 1970 he taught Byzantine philology at the University of Cagliari.

In 1969, Degani became Professor in Greek Literature at the University of Bologna, where he spent the rest of his career. In Bologna, Degani was chair of Greek literature, also teaching History of Ancient Greek language (1970–1972), History of Classical Philology (1973–1977, 1987–1988), Byzantine philology (1977–1978), Greek philology (1990–1992), Medieval Greek (1990–1992, at the Scuola per Archivisti in Ravenna).

A lifelong Marxist, Degani married Maria Grazia Bonanno, would-be Professor in Greek literature at the University of Rome Tor Vergata, but the marriage ended in divorce. He died in 2000.

== Research activity ==
Degani's first and foremost interest was in Greek elegy and iambic poetry, but he also was interested in Greek tragedy and philosophy. He published the Teubner edition of Hipponax and monographs on Greek parodic poetry. With Gabriele Burzacchini, he edited an anthology of Greek lyrics. In Cagliari, Degani started working on Greek lexicography, and in particular on Hesychius of Alexandria, publishing philological notes on the Lexicon and the critical edition of a selection of entries from letter alpha.

In his last years, he was working on a research project on Athenaeus, which aimed at the first Italian translation and commentary of The Learned Banqueters. His translation of Book I was published posthumously. Occasionally, he wrote on Byzantine literature: Nikephoros Basilakes, Niketas Choniates, Byzantine epigram. He developed an interest in history of classical scholarship, in particular for modern Italian scholars and the academic body of the University of Bologna, and published a substantial overview of Greek philology in Italy in the XX century and an essay on the methodological relationship between history and philology.

== Publications ==
The full list of publications, totalling more than 350 items, was compiled and published in 2000.

=== Monographs ===
- Aristofane (1982). Le nuvole. Translated by Degani, E. Siracusa: INDA.
- Ateneo (2010). Degani, E.; Burzacchini, G. (eds.). I deipnosofisti. Epitome dal libro I. Eikasmós. Studi 17. Bologna: Pátron. ISBN 978-88-555-3064-4.
- Degani, E. (1961). Αἰών da Omero ad Aristotele. Padua: CEDAM.
- Degani, E. (1974). Tammaro, V. (ed.). Poeti parodici greci. Bologna: CLUEB.
- Degani, E. (1977). Poeti giambici ed elegiaci. Letture critiche. Milan: Mursia.
- Degani, E. (1984). Studi su Ipponatte. Bari: Adriatica.
- Degani, E. (1989). Da Gaetano Pelliccioni a Goffredo Coppola: la letteratura greca a Bologna dall'Unità d'Italia alla Liberazione. Bologna: CLUEB.
- Degani, E. (2001). Αἰών. Da Omero ad Aristotele. Eikasmós. Studi 5. Bologna: Pátron. ISBN 978-88-555-2590-9.
- Degani, E. (2004). Albiani, M. G.; et al. (eds.). Filologia e storia. Spudasmata 95/I–II. Vol. I–II. Hildesheim – Zürich – New York: Olms. ISBN 978-34-871-2571-8.
- Degani, E., ed. (1982). Poesia parodica greca. Bologna: CLUEB.
- Degani, E., ed. (1983). Hipponax. Leipzig: Teubner.
- Degani, E., ed. (1991). Hipponax (2nd ed.). Leipzig – Stuttgart: Teubner. doi:10.1515/9783110949759.
- Degani, E.; Burzacchini, G., eds. (1977). Lirici greci. Antologia. Florence: La Nuova Italia.
- Degani, E.; Burzacchini, G., eds. (2005). Lirici greci. Antologia. Eikasmós. Studi 11 (2nd ed.). Bologna: Pátron. ISBN 978-88-555-2840-5.
- Ipponatte (2007). Degani, E.; Burzacchini, G. (eds.). Frammenti. Eikasmós. Studi 15. Bologna: Pátron. ISBN 978-88-555-2917-4.

=== Articles and book chapters ===
- Degani, E. (1965a). "Hesych. α 7055 etc., Latte". Helikon. 5: 486–491.
- Degani, E. (1965b). "Hesychiana". Rendiconti della Classe di Scienze morali, storiche e filologiche dell'Accademia dei Lincei. 20: 327–329.
- Degani, E. (1967a). "Hesych. A 7001–7330". Quaderni dell'Istituto di Filologia Greca. 2: 133–150.
- Degani, E. (1967b). "Hesychiana". Quaderni dell'Istituto di Filologia Greca. 2: 113–119.
- Degani, E. (1968). "Hesychiana". Quaderni dell'Istituto di Filologia Greca. 3: 101–110.
- Degani, E. (1969). "Contributi critico-testuali a due Encomi di Niceforo Basilace". Museum Criticum. 4: 90–109.
- Degani, E. (1975–1977). "Hesychiana". Museum Criticum. 10–12: 273–274.
- Degani, E. (1979). "Il De signis Constantinopolitanis di Niceta di Chone". XVI Corso sulla cultura e l'arte ravennate. Ravenna: Università di Bologna. pp. 29–40.
- Degani, E. (1981). "Il De signis Constantinopolitanis di Niceta Coniate". In Gallo, I. (ed.). Studi salernitani in memoria di Raffaele Cantarella. Salerno: Pietro Laveglia Editore. pp. 507–512.
- Degani, E. (1984). "Macedonian Glosses in Hesychius' Lexicon". Hellenika. 35: 3–28.
- Degani, E. (1988). "Da Gaetano Pelliccioni a Vittorio Puntoni: un capitolo di storia della filologia classica nel nostro Ateneo". Profili Accademici e culturali di '800 e oltre. Bologna: Accademia delle Scienze. pp. 117–137.
- Degani, E. (1989a). "Italia. La filologia greca nel secolo XX". La filologia greca e latina nel secolo XX. Atti del Congresso Internazionale: Roma, CNR, 17-21 settembre 1984. Biblioteca di Studi Antichi, 56. Vol. II. Pisa: Giardini Editori e Stampatori. pp. 1065–1140.
- Degani, E. (1998). "L'epigramma bizantino". In Conca, F.; Maisano, R. (eds.). La mimesi bizantina. Atti della quarta Giornata di studi bizantini sotto il patrocinio della Associazione Italiana di Studi Bizantini, Milano, 16–17 maggio 1996. Naples: D'Auria. pp. 41–52.
- Degani, E. (1999). "Filologia e storia". Eikasmos. 10: 279–314.

== Bibliography ==
- Alvoni, G. (2000). "Bibliografia di Enzo Degani" (PDF). Eikasmós. 11: 347–358.
- Bossi, F. (2000). "Enzo Degani" (PDF). Eikasmós. 11: 337–344.
- Burzacchini, G. (2001). "Enzo Degani". Gnomon. 73 (5): 470–476. JSTOR 40493602.
- Pasquale Degani, A. (1945). La voce di un ostaggio. Vita vissuta. Vicenza: N.A.
- Pasquale Degani, A. (1950). La grande bufera. Milan: Stampa d'oggi.
