= Dilu Melo =

Brazilian singer

- Born: Maria de Lourdes Argollo Oliver; September 25, 1913
- Died: April 24, 2000 (aged 86); Rio de Janeiro
- Occupations: singer, composer, instrumentalist and folklorist

Maria de Lourdes Argollo Oliver (Viana, September 25, 1913 – Rio de Janeiro, April 24, 2000), better known by the stage name Dilu Melo, was a Brazilian singer, songwriter, instrumentalist and folklorist.

At the age of 5, she started studying music and violin. At the age of nine, started learning guitar with her mother, D. Nenê, and piano with professor Elizéne D'Ambrósio. At the age of 10, composed her first work, a waltz entitled "Heloísa", in honor of her younger sister.

In 1958, she recorded the song "Nos velhos tempos", by Altamiro Carrilho and Armando Nunes. Influenced by Antenógenes Silva, she began to play the accordion, receiving from the press the name "Queen of the Accordion".

She was the author of more than one hundred songs. Among her interpreters were Ademilde Fonseca, Amália Rodrigues, Carmen Costa, Nara Leão, Fagner, Clara Nunes, Marlene and Dóris Monteiro.

== Discography ==
- Engenho d'água/Coco babaçu (1938)
- Fiz a cama na varanda/Sapo cururu (1944)
- Cesário/Planta milho (1945)
- Menino dos olhos tristes/Coisas do Rio Grande (1945)
- Lá na serra/Qual o valor da sanfona (1949)
- Recordando os pagos/As coisas erradas do mundo (1950)
- Maravia/Tudo é verdade (1952)
- Redinha de algodão/Meia canha (1952)
- Carta a Papai Noel/Tempinho bom (1952)
- Sans souci/Os 10 mandamentos do sanfoneiro (1954)
