= Viola de Queluz =

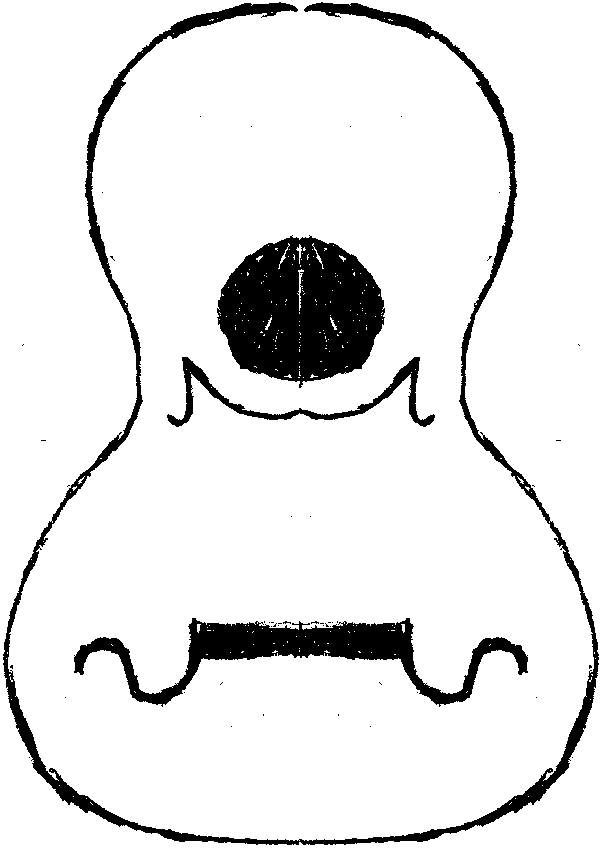
- A plan of the body shape of a Viola de Queluz, with typical decorations of the soundboard and bridge design.

String instrument
- Classification: String instrument
- Hornbostel–Sachs classification: (Composite chordophone)
- Developed: Brazil

Related instruments
- Viola caipira, Viola beiroa, Viola braguesa, Viola campaniça, Viola da terra, Viola sertaneja, Viola terceira, Viola toeira, Viola amarantina, Viola de arame.

The viola de Queluz is a stringed instrument from Queluz, Brazil. It has 12 strings in 5 courses. The lower 2 are tripled, and the rest are doubled.

They were produced mainly between the late 19th and early 20th century, and inspired by the viola toeira from Portugal.

They were traditionally handmade, and are still made today, despite not being as popular as they once were. There was a conference of players and luthiers in 2010, also attended by local government officials. The most prestigious guitar player and craftsman of the old Queluz was José Rodrigues Salgado, who, after having played for Pedro II at the residence of the Baron of Queluz (during the Emperor's trip to Ouro Preto, in 1889, for the inauguration of the railway branch), started to make guitars for the Court. His craft - an art passed on through generations - was passed on to his descendants, who, until the middle of the last century, still made violas. The last viola manufactured by the Salgado family was made in the year 1969.
