= Folk instrument =

Musical instrument

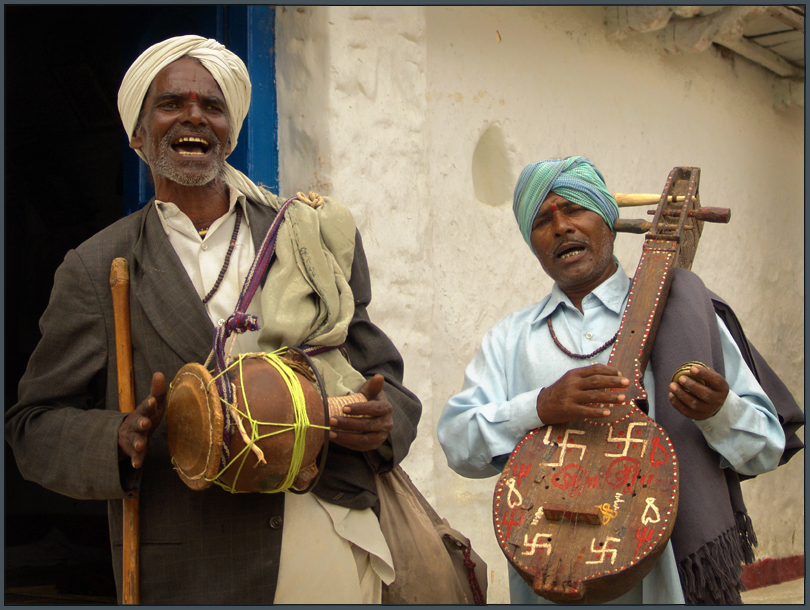
Indian village musicians. Indians have always distinguished between classical and folk music, though in the past even classical Indian music used to rely on the unwritten transmission of repertoire.

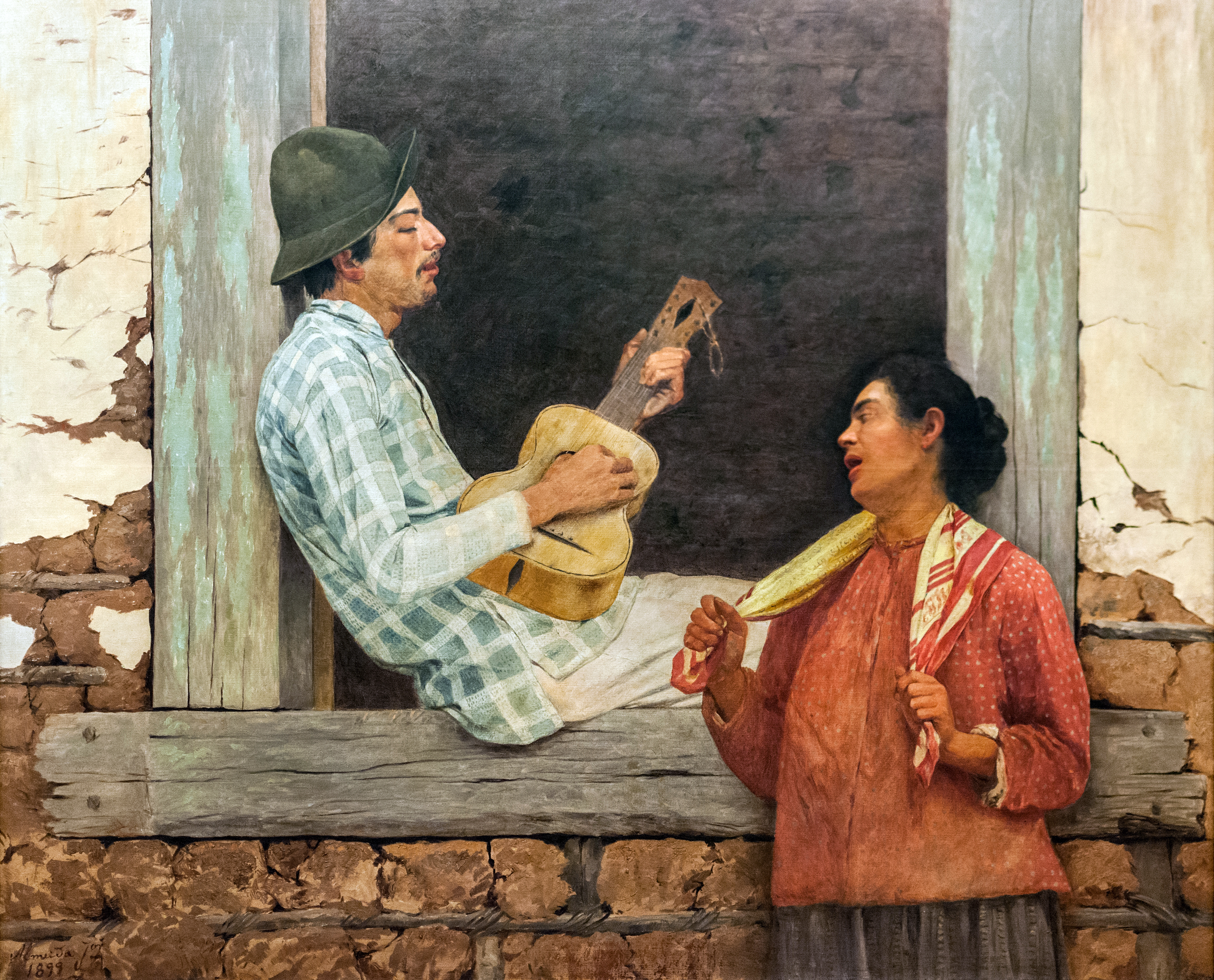
Violeiro playing, by Almeida Júnior. The viola caipira is a Brazilian folk instrument.

A folk instrument is a traditional musical instrument that has remained largely restricted to traditional folk music, and is not usually used in the classical music or other elite and formal musical genres of the culture concerned, though related instruments may be.

It can be made from wood, metal or other material; all the major families of instruments are represented. The instruments can be percussion instruments, or different types of flutes or trumpets, or string instruments that are plucked, hammered or use a form of bow.

Some instruments are referred to as folk instruments because they commonly appear in folk music, even though they are also used in other types of music; for example, the classical violin and the folk fiddle are usually identical.

== List of folk instruments ==
For instruments used in particular European folk styles, see the List of European folk music traditions

- accordion
- alboka
- angklung
- appalachian dulcimer
- autoharp
- bağlama
- bagpipe
- balalaika
- bandura
- banjo
- bass
- binioù kozh
- birimbau
- bodhrán
- bombard
- bouzouki & Irish bouzouki
- brommtopp
- bukkehorn
- bullroarer
- cajón
- catá
- cavaquinho
- chajchas
- charango
- çifteli
- cimbalom
- çığırtma
- claves
- concertina
- concheras
- cuatro
- daegeum
- damphu
- darbuka
- dhol
- dholak
- didgeridoo
- dingulator
- dizi
- djembe
- dotara
- dranyen
- drum
- ektara
- erhu
- fiddle
- fujara
- gadulka
- gaida
- gayageum
- guan
- gudok
- guitalin
- guitar
- guitarra Portuguesa
- gusle
- gusli
- haegeum
- hammered dulcimer
- hank drum
- hardingfele
- harmonica
- harmonium
- hurdy-gurdy
- jew harp
- jouhikko
- jug
- kantele
- kaval
- kazoo
- khamak
- klopotec
- kobza
- kokle
- komuz
- kora
- kulintang
- låtfiol
- launeddas
- lur
- madal
- mandocello
- mandola
- mandolin & octave mandolin
- marimbula
- mbira/thumb piano
- melodeon
- mountain dulcimer
- mridangam
- musical saw
- nyckelharpa
- ocarina
- oud
- pan flute
- pipa
- pogo cello
- quena
- rabeca
- ravanahatha
- rebab
- rebec
- recorder
- rubab
- salamiyyah
- sarangi (Indian)
- sarangi (Nepali)
- sasando
- shehnai
- shofar
- sinfonia
- sitar
- smallpipes
- snare drum
- sopilka
- spilåpipa
- steel guitar
- steelpan
- stompbox
- suona
- švilpa
- tabla
- talking drum
- tambura
- tin whistle
- tiple
- trembita
- tres
- udu
- uilleann pipes
- ukulele
- viola beiroa
- viola braguesa
- viola caipira
- viola campaniça
- viola da terra
- viola toeira
- vuvuzela
- washboard
- washtub bass
- willow flute
- xylophone
- yangqin
- zampoña
- zhaleika
- zither
- zurna
