= List of Portuguese musical instruments =

This is an incomplete list of Portuguese traditional musical instruments.

== Membranophones ==
- Adufe: the adufe is a square double skinned frame drum. The skins are sewn together, often with seeds between them. It is held with the thumbs of both hands and the pointer of the right hand, leaving the other fingers free to hit the instrument. This instrument was introduced into Portugal (and Spain) when the Moors of North Africa invaded the Iberian Peninsula, beginning in the early 700s A.D. (see Al-Andalus).
- Bombo: bombos are large bass drums that are played in a vertical fashion. They can be up to eighty cm in diameter. Usually the musician hits only one side of the skins, producing a deep and low sound.
- Sarronca: the sarronca is a friction membranophone composed of a stretched skin over a jug that will serve as a resonance box. Sound is emitted when a stick or a reed is rubbed against the skin.

== Chordophones ==
- Braguinha: the braguinha is a kind of cavaquinho (see below) that is usually found in Madeira.
- Cavaquinho: the cavaquinho is a small string instrument of the European guitar family with four wires or gut strings. The Hawaiian Islands have an instrument similar to the cavaquinho called the ukulele, which is thought to be a development of the cavaquinho, brought to the island by Portuguese immigrants. The Hawaiian ukulele has four strings and a similar shape to the cavaquinho, which was introduced into Hawaii by Augusto Dias, Manuel Nunes, and João Fernandes in 1879.
- Guitarra portuguesa: the guitarra portuguesa is a 12 string instrument originating in the Middle Ages, based on the cittern. It is a local adaptation of the English guitar, introduced to Portugal in the second half of the 1700s through the British trading post in Porto.
- Machete de braga: the machete de braga is a small stringed instrument from Madeira, Portugal, with four metal strings.
- Machete de rajão: the machete de rajão is a 5-stringed instrument from Madeira.
- Viola amarantina: The viola amarantina is from Amarante, Northern Portugal. It has 10 strings in 5 courses. It is also named viola de dois corações (two-hearted guitar) because of the two heart-shaped frontal openings.
- Viola de arame: the viola de arame is similar to the viola braguesa and may have a sound hole in the shape of two hearts, a half moon, or an oval. It is common on Madeira and the Azores, and has nine strings arranged in five courses: 2-2-2-1-2.
- Viola braguesa: the viola braguesa is an instrument resembling the guitar strung with five steel strings. It is played using all five strings at the same time.
- Viola da Terceira: the viola da terceira is a guitar associated with the island of Terceira in the Azores. It has either 15 strings, arranged in 6 courses of 3-3-3-2-2-2, or 18 strings, arranged in 7 courses of 3-3-3-3-2-2-2.
- Viola da terra: The viola da terra is a small guitar from the Portuguese islands of the Azores. It has two sound holes in the shape of hearts, and it may have either 12 strings arranged in 5 courses, or 15 strings, arranged in either 5 or 6 courses.
- Viola toeira: the viola toeira has a horizontal oval shape sound hole and 12 strings organized in five courses. See also viola caipira.

== Aerophones ==
- Concertina: is the name by which the diatonic button accordion is known in Portugal.
- Gaita de Foles (bagpipe): the gaita de foles has two or more single- or double-reed pipes, the reeds being vibrated by wind fed by arm pressure on a skin or cloth bag.
- Palheta: the palheta is a double reed woodwind instrument similar to the oboe.
