= Music of Madeira =

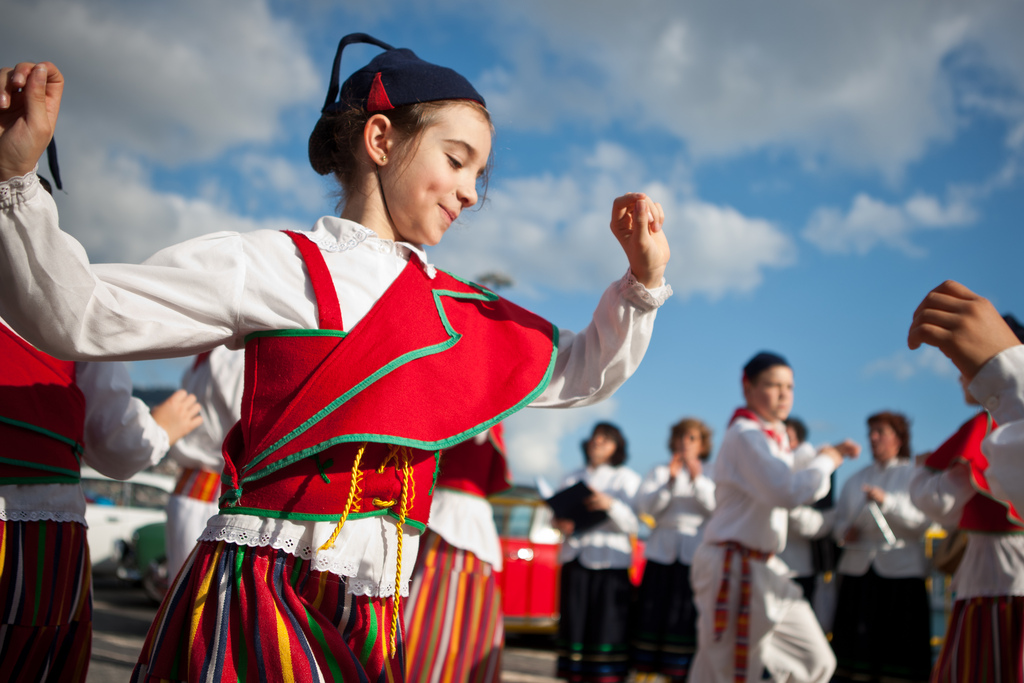
Bailinho da Madeira

The Music of Madeira reflects its cultural heritage, this can be seen in the local folklore music, which in Madeira is widespread and mainly uses local musical instruments such as the machete, rajão, brinquinho and cavaquinho, which are used in traditional folkloric dances like the bailinho da Madeira.

== History ==
Emigrants from Madeira also influenced the creation of new musical instruments. In the 1880s, the ukulele was created, based on several similar small guitar-like instruments of Madeiran origin, the machete,cavaquinho and the rajão. The ukulele was introduced to the Hawaiian Islands by Portuguese immigrants from Madeira and Cape Verde. Three immigrants in particular, Madeiran cabinet makers Manuel Nunes, José do Espírito Santo, and Augusto Dias, are generally credited as the first ukulele makers. Two weeks after they disembarked from the SS Ravenscrag in late August 1879, the Hawaiian Gazette reported that "Madeira Islanders recently arrived here, have been delighting the people with nightly street concerts."

== Famous musicians ==
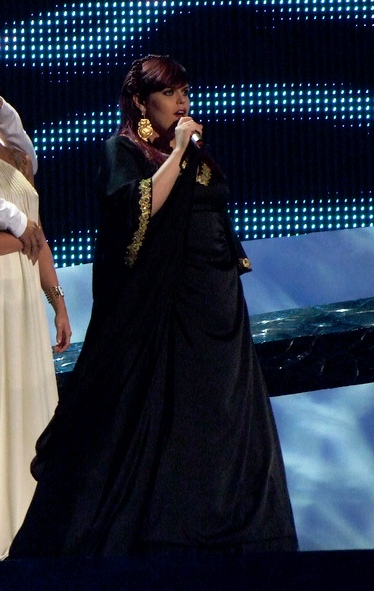
Vânia Fernandes at the Eurovision Song Contest 2008

- Ana da Silva
- Elisa Silva - winner of Festival da Canção 2020 with the song "Medo de Sentir".
- Luís Jardim
- Ruben Aguiar
- Maria Ascensão (1926–2001), folklorist
- Maximiano de Sousa
- Pedro Camacho
- Vânia Fernandes – represented Portugal in the Eurovision Song Contest 2008 with the song "Senhora do Mar (Negras Águas)".
- NAPA – represented Portugal in the Eurovision Song Contest 2025 with the song "Deslocado".
