= Deolinda =

Portuguese musical group

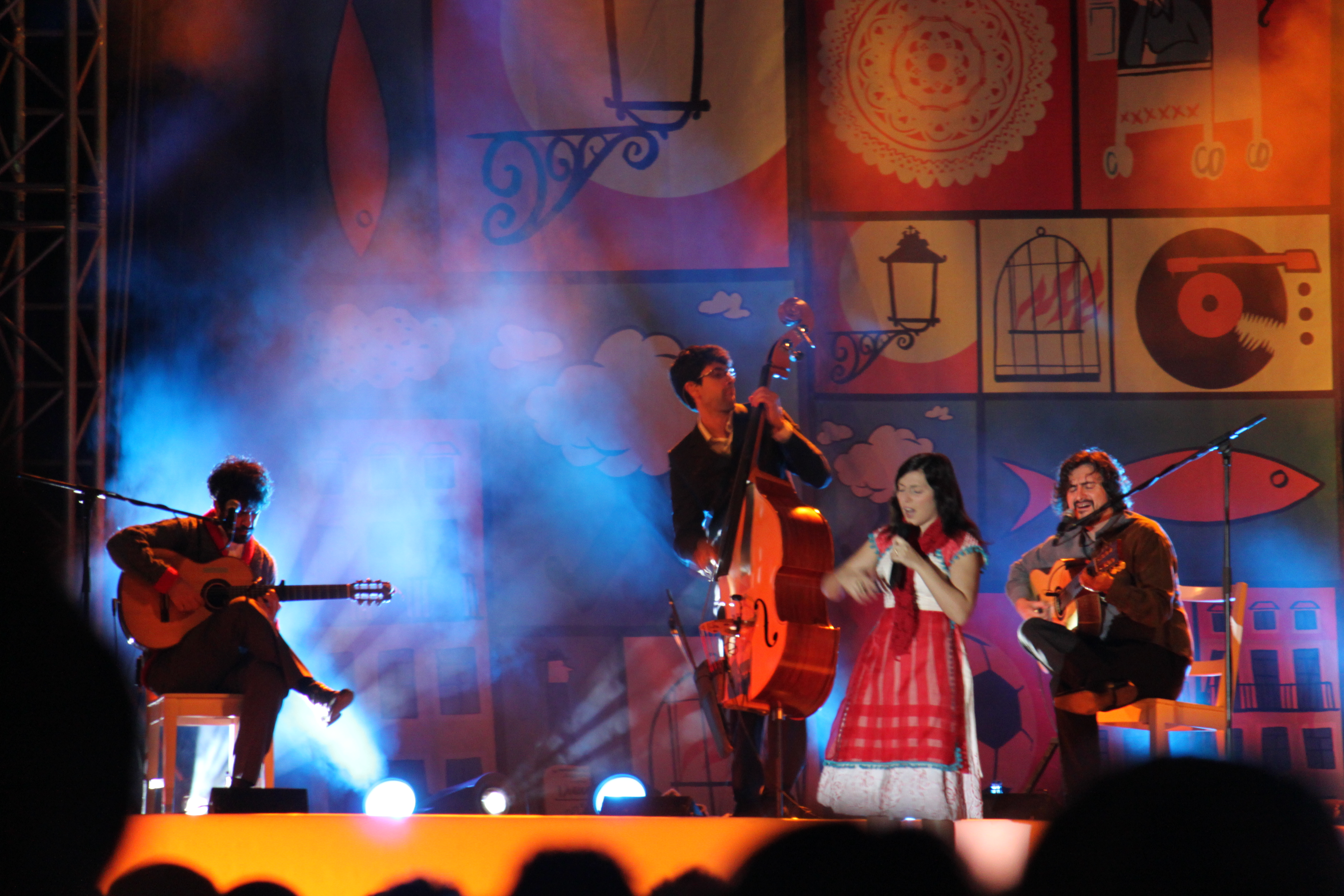
- Deolinda live in Monchique

Background information
- Origin: Lisbon, Portugal
- Genres: Portuguese; Fado; World music; Folk
- Years active: 2006–2017
- Labels: EMI
- Members: Ana Bacalhau; Luís José Martins; Pedro da Silva Martins; José Pedro Leitão

Deolinda (Portuguese pronunciation: [diuˈlĩdɐ]) were an acoustic Portuguese "neofado" group, whose music often deals with social and political commentary. Founded in 2006, their first album was released in 2008, which went double platinum. Their second was in the top ten in Portugal for over fifteen weeks. They have toured the United States, Canada, and Europe and have played at festivals such as the World Music Expo, Mawazine and the Festival Internacional Cervantino.

== History ==
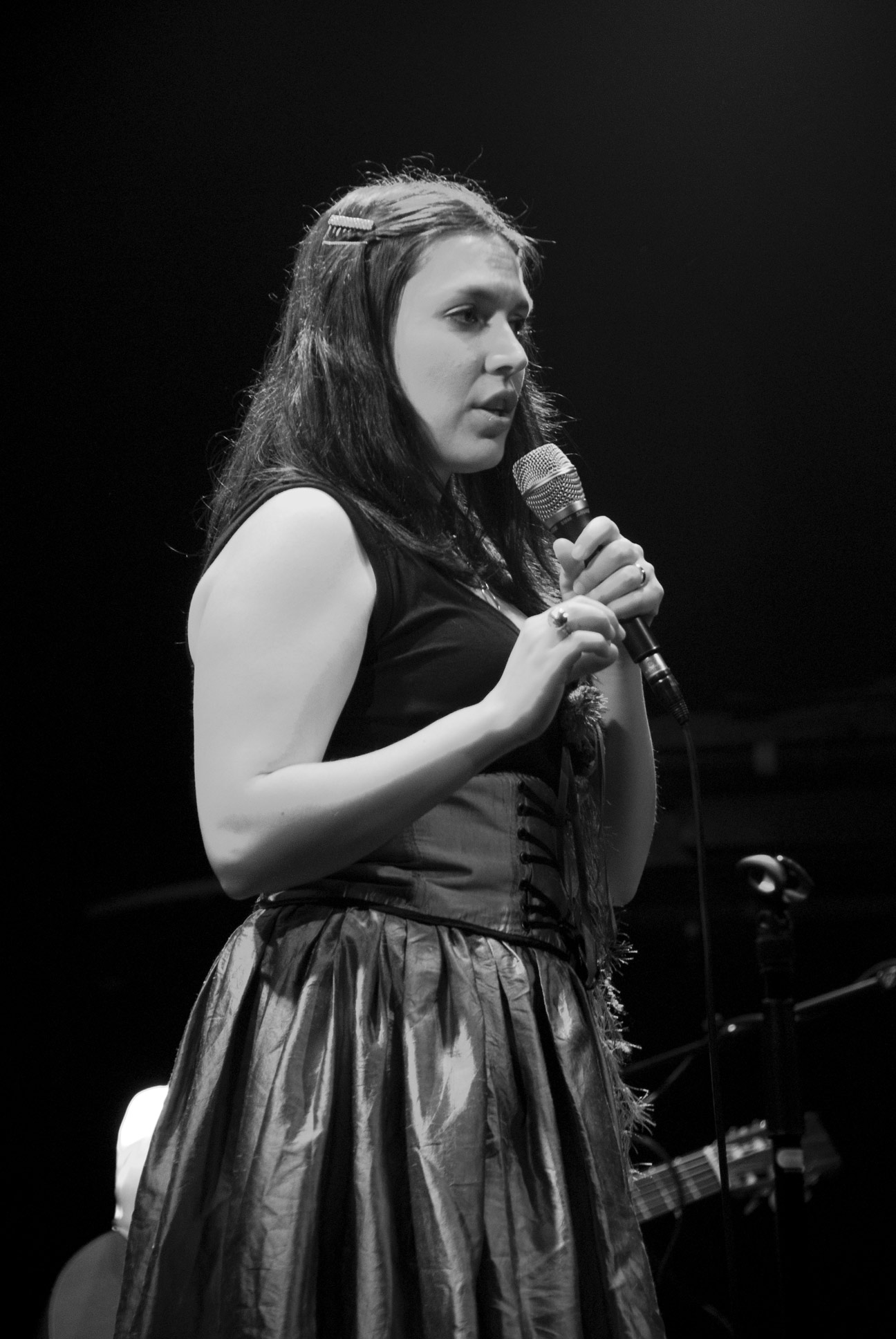
Ana Bacalhau

Deolinda was founded in 2006 as an acoustic group named after a fictional young woman, who loves fado and comments on contemporary Portugal. Singer Ana Bacalhau stated that she is "the sum of our four personalities."

The group has four members, singer Ana Bacalhau, brothers (and Ana's cousins) Pedro da Silva Martins and Luís José Martins, and Ana's husband José Pedro Leitão. All four had been involved in various musical activities before Deolinda. Ana Bacalhau was a fado-jazz punker in a band called Lupanar (2001-2006), which was much more macabre and cutting. Luís José Martins (guitar, ukulele, viola, Portuguese cavaco, and guitarlele) is conservatory trained, and double bass player José Pedro Leitão has a classical and jazz background.

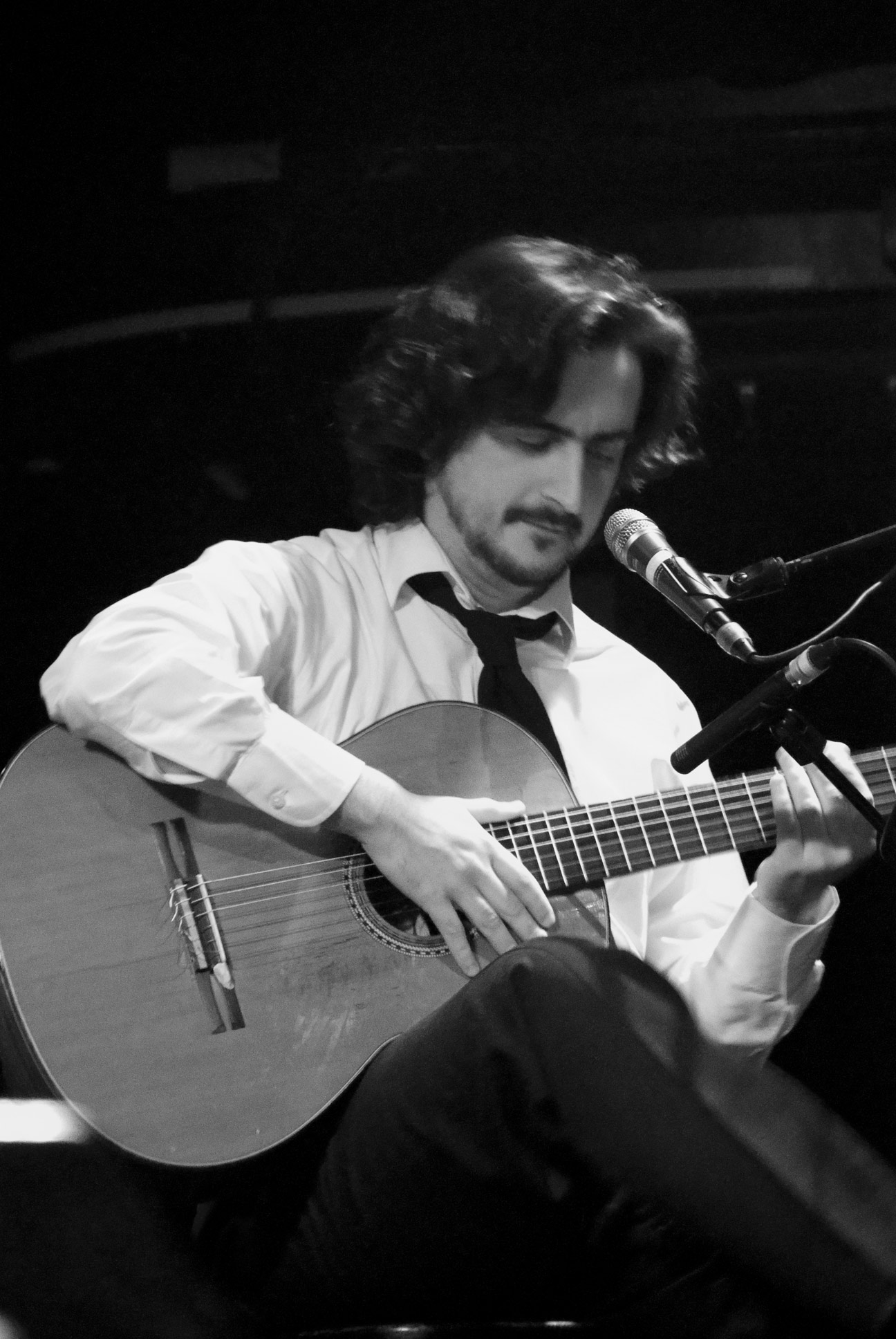
Pedro da Silva Martins

The ensemble's origin was over a dinner between Ana, her cousins and Zé Pedro discussing the idea of collaborating. They stated they pulled out their instruments and found they had an unspoken "chemistry." They quickly became popular in clubs, with a reputation gained by word-of-mouth, attracting attention from record labels by 2007.

Their debut album Canção Ao Lado (2008) went double-platinum in Portugal with shows beginning to sell out. The album remained one of the most popular in Portugal for over two years. Their second album, Dois Selos E Um Carimbo (2010), was in the top ten in the country for fifteen weeks after it came out.

== Music ==
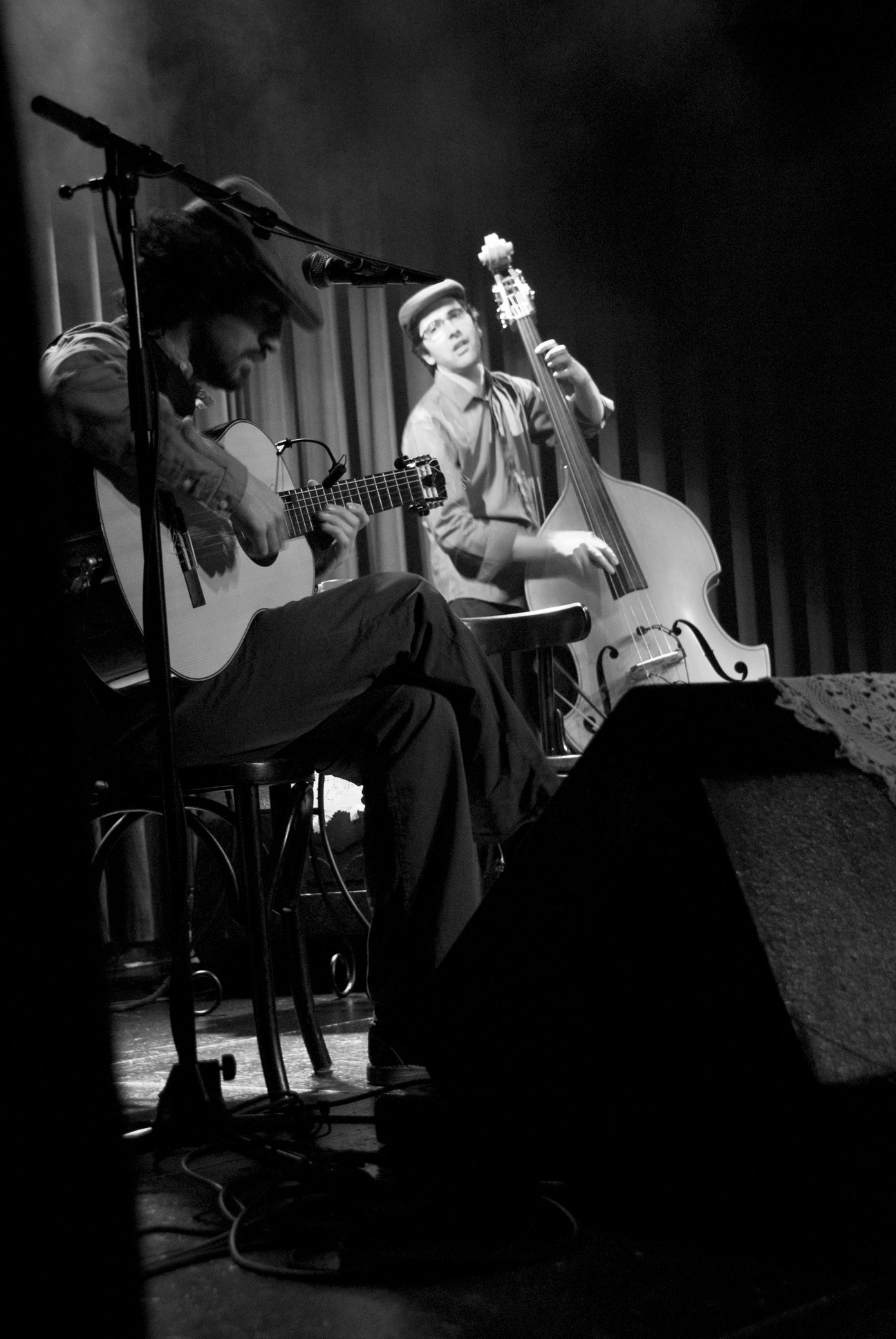
Luís José Martins (left) and Zé Pedro Leitão (right)

Although strongly associated with fado (lit. fate), a usually dark and somber form of Portuguese music, they do not play it, at least not traditionally. Traditional fado faded during Portugal’s dictatorship in the 20th century, but it has made a comeback, by a generation that grew up on Pearl Jam and Nirvana, but who also rediscovered the recordings of their grandparents’ generation. This rediscovery, created a new wave of fado, sometimes called neofado, which includes artists such as Mariza, Dulce Pontes and Ana Moura, who respect the classics (e.g. the work of Amália Rodrigues), but have created their own versions, generally fusing other musical styles and/or using electrified instruments.

Deolinda’s work also integrates other musical styles, including pop, folks and blues, but they do use only acoustic instruments. Their work is even more distinct in that it is musically more whimsical and playful, sometimes called "happy fado" and even when serious, is never brooding.

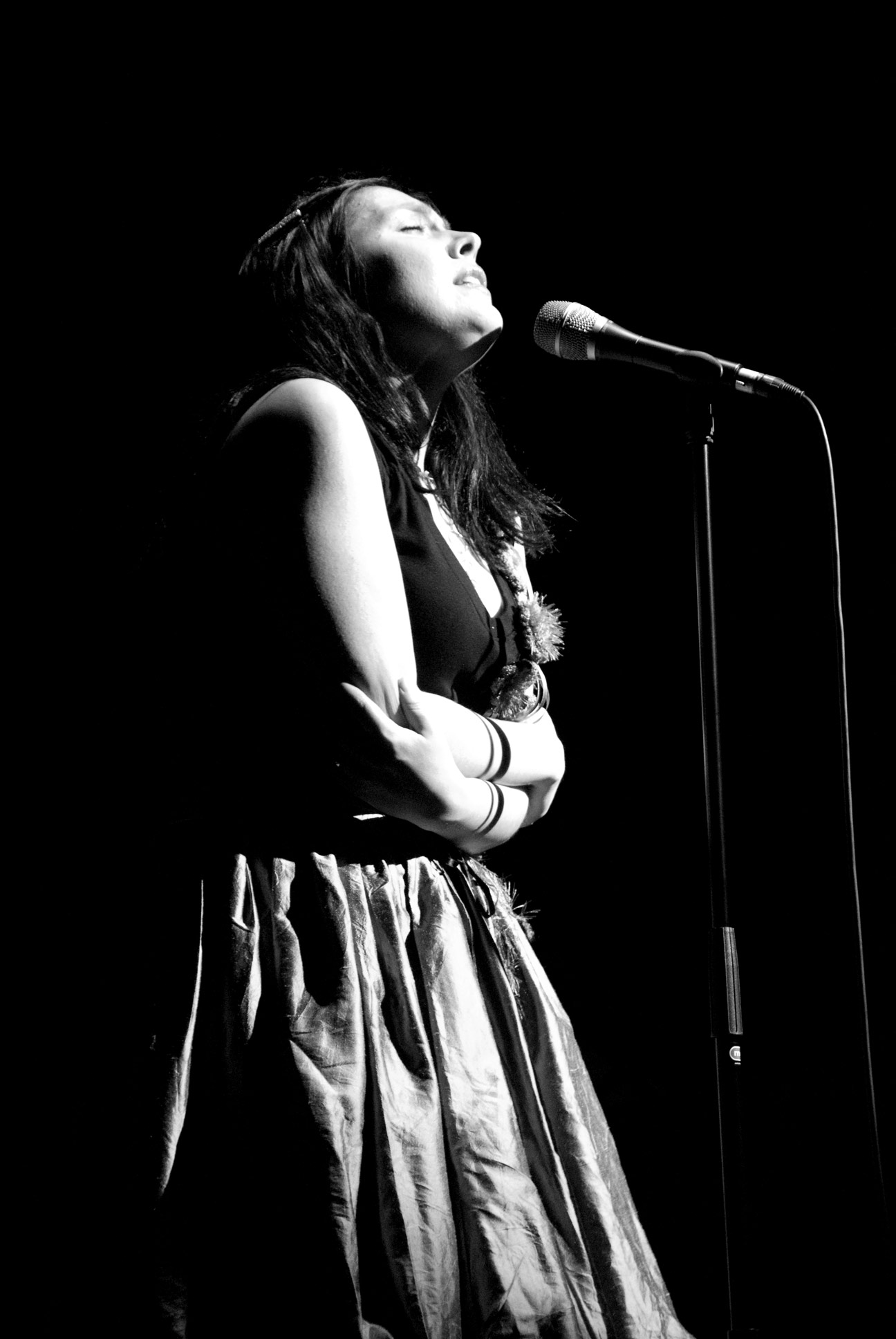
Ana Bacalhau

Their lyrics are elliptical and ironic, generally dealing with social interactions and human frailties, often with humor. Their work is an indirect form of protest music, which has its roots in the música de intervenção tradition of Portuguese folk musicians, before the 1974 Carnation Revolution, which ended five decades of dictatorship. Like their predecessors, their criticism is indirect, using metaphors a lighter pop sound. One of their most popular songs, Parva que sou, has become a kind of anthem for students and young people frustrated with the lack of economic opportunities.

Most of their work is written from the perspective of a fictional young woman named Deolinda, created by the group’s songwriter Pedro da Silva Martins. Deolinda lives with her cats and goldfish in a Lisbon apartment, watching the world through her window and commentating on what she sees. Deolinda loves Portugal, but sees its flaws, and comments on them and other aspects of life in the country.

Initially Silva Martins wrote two songs about Deolinda but fans demanded more, so she became the focus of the group’s. The tactic has been so successful that Deolinda appear as a cartoon character on the first two albums, and she continues to be the voice in the third, Mundo pequenino, released in 2013.

The departure from the musical style, which is only obliquely evoked, and subject matter of traditional fado has led to Deolinda’s music as being called "not fado" or called "indie neofado."

While the band members can play a variety of instruments, they stick to two guitars, a double bass and vocals in order to travel light.

== Performances ==
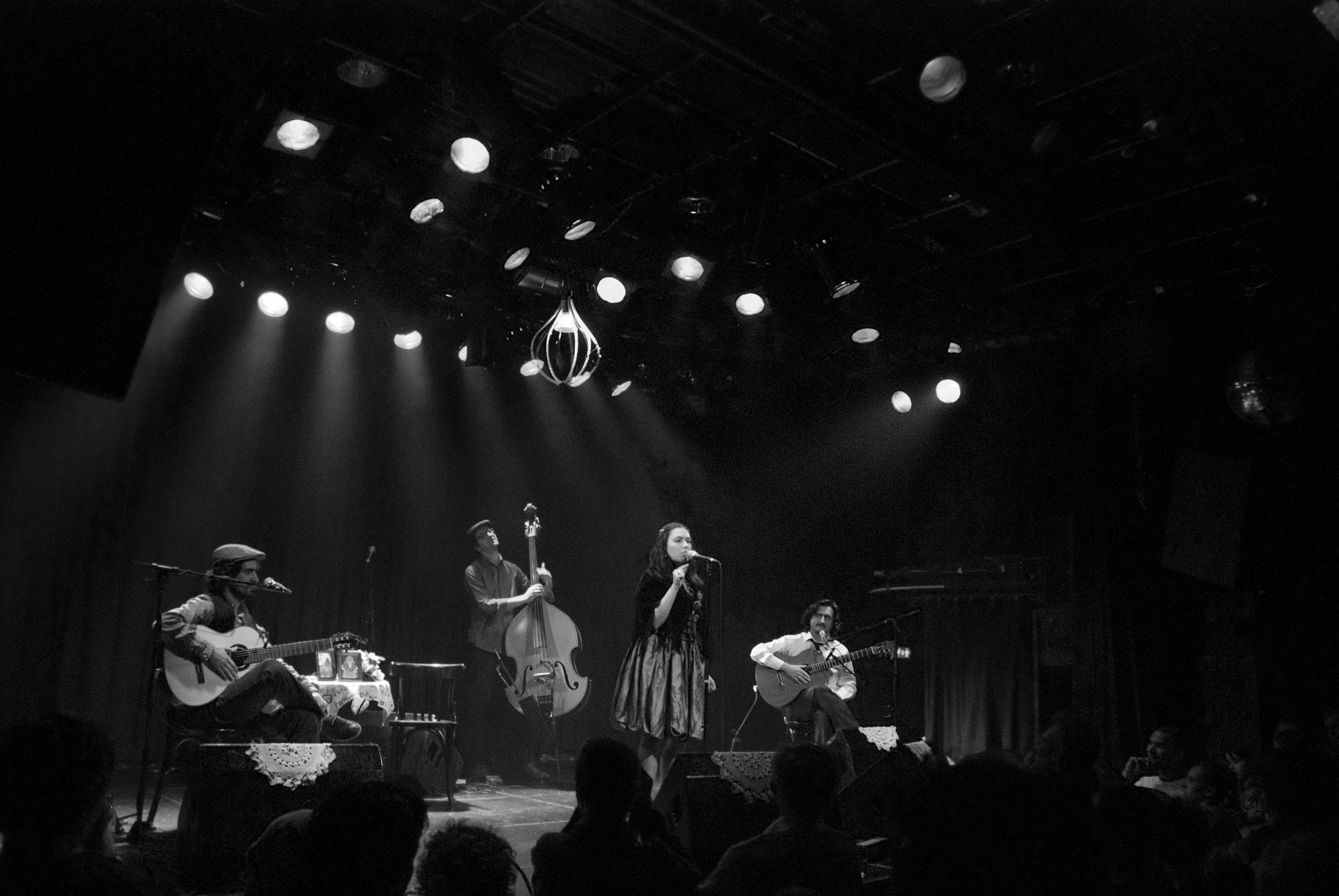
Deolinda playing Melkweg Amsterdam.

It has a reputation for flamboyant and sometimes comic performances. Unlike traditional fado singers who wear black shawls, Ana wears brightly colored clothes based on traditional folk costumes of Portugal. The lead singer uses theatrics, stage banter and spritely intonations to keep the attention of the audience.

The band started in clubs, but by 2009 had played the World Music Expo, followed by a major tour in the United States, Canada and Europe, playing cities such as Albuquerque, Chicago, New York, Sherbrooke, Detroit, Stockholm, Vienna, Brussels and Paris. In 2014, the group was invited to perform at the Festival Internacional Cervantino in Mexico.

== Recognition ==
As of 2013, Deolinda is the most famous neofado group in Portugal. Music magazine Songlines named the group the best world beat newcomer after the release of the 2008 album, Canção ao lado. The second album, Dois selos e um carimbo, won the José Alfonso Award in 2011.

== Members ==
The founding and current members of Deolinda are:

- Ana Bacalhau (vocals)
- Luís José Martins (classical guitar, ukulele, cavaquinho, guitalele, viola braguesa and vocals)
- Pedro da Silva Martins (composition, lyrics, classical guitar and vocals)
- José Pedro Leitão (double bass and vocals)

== Discography ==
=== Studio albums ===
Year	Album	Chart positions	Sales	Certifications (sales thresholds)	Track listing
Year	Album	POR	Sales	Certifications (sales thresholds)	Track listing
2008	Canção ao Lado: First studio album; Released: 2008	3	POR: 55,000+	AFP: 2× Platinum	1. Mal Por Mal; 2. Fado Toninho; 3. Não Sei Falar De Amor; 4. Contado Ninguém Acredita; 5. Eu Tenho Um Melro; 6. Movimento Perpétuo Associativo; 7. O Fado Não É Mau; 8. Lisboa Não É A Cidade Perfeita; 9. Fon-Fon-Fon; 10. Fado Castigo; 11. Ai Rapaz; 12. Canção Ao Lado; 13. Garçonete Da Casa De Fado; 14. Clandestino
2010	Dois Selos e Um Carimbo: Second studio album; Released: 2010	1	POR: 35,000+	AFP: Platinum	1. Se Uma Onda Invertesse A Marcha; 2. Um Contra O Outro; 3. Não Tenho Mais Razões; 4. Passou Por Mim E Sorriu; 5. Sem Noção; 6. A Problemática Colocação De Um Mastro; 7. Ignaras Vedetas; 8. Quando Janto Em Restaurantes; 9. Entre Alvalade E As Portas De Benfica; 10. Canção Da Tal Guitarra; 11. Patinho De Borracha; 12. Há Dias Que Não São Dias; 13. Fado Notário; 14. Uma Ilha
2013	Mundo Pequenino: Third studio album; Released: 2013	2	POR:	AFP: Platinum	1. Algo Novo; 2. Concordância; 3. Gente Torta; 4. Há-de Passar; 5. Medo de Mim; 6. Musiquinha; 7. Semáforo da João XXI; 8. Seja Agora; 9. Pois Foi; 10. Balanço; 11. Doidos; 12. Não Ouviste Nada
2016	Outras Histórias: Fourth studio album; Released: 2016	1			1. Bons Dias; 2. Manta Para Dois; 3. Mau Accordar; 4. Corzinha De Verão; 5. Bote Furado; 6. Desavindos; 7. Canção Aranha; 8. A Avó Da Maria; 9. Nunca É Tarde; 10. A Velha E O DJ; 11. Pontos No Mundo; 12. Berbicacho; 13. Bom Partido; 14. As Canções Que Tu Farias; 15. Dançar De Olhos Fechados

=== Live albums ===
Year	Album	Chart positions	Sales	Certifications (sales thresholds)
Year	Album	POR	Sales	Certifications (sales thresholds)
2011	Deolinda no Coliseu dos Recreios: First live album; Released: 2011	3	POR:	AFP:

=== Singles ===
Year	Title	Chart Positions	Album
Year	Title	POR	Album
2008	"Fado Toninho"	18	Canção ao Lado
2010	"Um contra o Outro"	22	Dois Selos E Um Carimbo
