= Braguinha =

Braguinha may refer to:

- Braguinha or Machete (musical instrument), a string instrument of the guitar family
- Braguinha (composer) (1907–2006), Brazilian songwriter
