= Çığırtma =

Musical instrument

Çığırtma or çağırtma is a Turkish folk instrument of the wind type.

The çığırtma is made from the wing bone of an eagle. It is known to be used mostly by shepherds and is an almost forgotten instrument today. It has a total of seven melody holes, with six on the top and one underneath. It is about 15–30 centimeters (5.9–11.8 inches) long.

== See also ==
- Kaval
