= Rajão =

String instrument

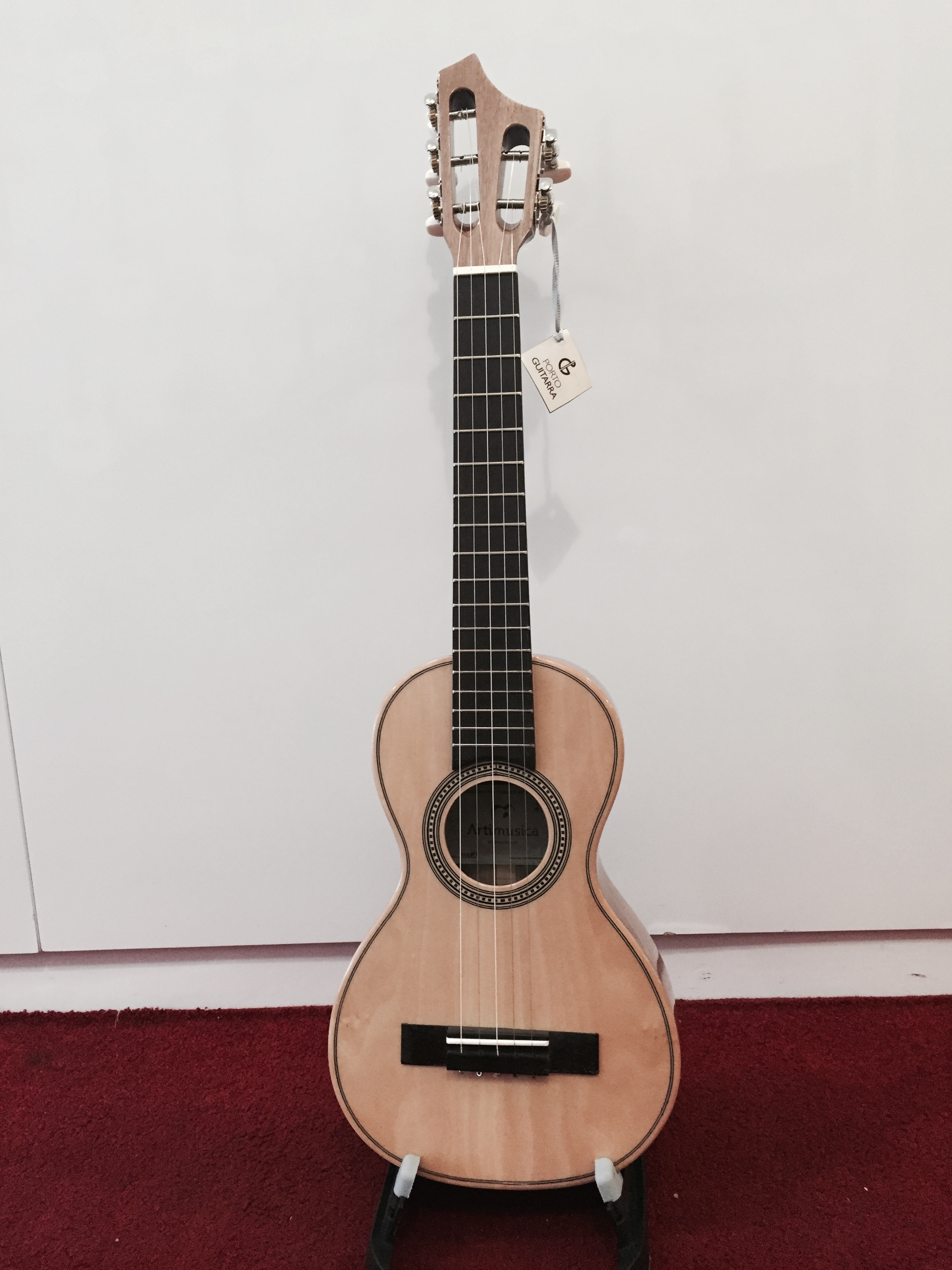
- 5-string rajão

String instrument
- Classification: String instrument
- Hornbostel–Sachs classification: (Composite chordophone)
- Developed: Madeira, Portugal

Related instruments
- Ukulele, cavaquinho, timple

The rajão (Portuguese: machete de rajão) is a 5-stringed instrument from Madeira, Portugal. The instrument traces back to the country's regional folk music, where it is used in folklore dances of Portugal in addition to other stringed instruments from the same region.

== History ==
There is little information of the origins of the rajão, but it is often associated with traditional folklore dance of Madeira and the origins of the ukulele of Hawaii. As early as 1879, Portuguese immigrants (who also owned business in musical instruments) brought the rajão (as well as a viola and braga) to Hawaii, where it was later given the nickname of the "taro-patch fiddle." The rajão can be known as the "mother of the ukulele."

== Construction and tuning ==
The instrument is about 70 centimeters (about 2 feet and 3 inches) in length and can be compared to a guitar with regard to structure and playing technique. On a modern rajão the strings are made of metal. The rajão is tuned to D_{4}-G_{4}-C_{4}-E_{4}-A_{4}, a reentrant tuning with the third string the lowest pitch. When it has 6 strings, the tuning becomes D_{4}-G_{4}-C_{4}-E_{4}-A_{4}-A_{4}. The rajão also comes with all five courses doubled, though these are less common.

== Related instruments ==
- Ukulele
- Cavaquinho
- Machete
- Braguinha

Re-entrant tuning used by the rajão
