= Mauro Diniz =

Mauro Diniz (born 1952) is a Brazilian professional cavaquinist. He also has a career as a songwriter and singer.

== Biography ==
Born in 1952 in one of the most traditional neighborhoods of carioca samba, Oswaldo Cruz, at the age of 4 he stayed between his father's legs, stunning everyone with his ability on the first cavaquinho chords. At the age of 8, besides having written a parody for one of his father's sambas, for the samba-enredo of the Bloco da Alegria carnival block, he was presented with a guitar by his mother Thereza, pastora of the samba school Portela. Therefore, Mauro Diniz made his first steps towards music guided by the Old Guard of Portela. He had his dreams rocked by antologic sambas from his greatest idol, his father, known by some as the "Extraordinary Monarco from Portela".

Mauro Diniz was an enviable autodidact, for a long while. At the age of 24 he bought his first cavaquinho, never letting go of the instrument until exchanging it for one which had belonged to "Master Nelson Cavaquinho", which accompanies him to this day. In 1982, he started attending Physical Education College, not finishing the course due to the frequent trips he took integrating singer Beth Carvalho's band. Mauro Diniz studied music with people such as the late Copinha, maestro Joaquim Nagle and, indicated by producer Rildo Hora, went on to study classical piano, harmony and perception.

Some time later he enrolled in CIGAM, one of the best music courses in Rio de Janeiro, where he concluded the course of Harmony, Improvisation and Arrangement. Mauro was also a student of Ian Guest, who he considers one of his greatest masters.
