= Viola sertaneja =

String instrument
- Classification: String instrument
- Hornbostel–Sachs classification: (Composite chordophone)
- Developed: Recife, Brazil

Related instruments
- Viola caipira, Viola beiroa, viola braguesa, viola campanica, viola de arame, viola da terra, viola Terceira, viola toeira, viola amarantina.

The viola sertaneja is a stringed musical instrument from northeastern Brazil. It has 10 strings in 5 courses. The strings are made of steel. It is tuned E2, A3, D4, G4, B3, E4 E4 E4.
