= Švilpa =

Lithuanian flute

The švilpa is a transverse flute type instrument of Lithuania. It is made of willow or aspen bark, or of ash or maple wood. A cylindrical pipe is made with a thin and a wide end. At times the pipe was made of several shorter pipes stacked together. The mouthpiece is similar to that of a flute, a skudutis or lamzdelis. While playing, the left hand holds the švilpa, and the index finger of the right hand covers the open end. The sound of the švilpa is soft, the timbre is gentle. The švilpa is a solo instrument for free improvisation, song and dance melodies, and sutartinės.
