= Viola campaniça =

Portuguese stringed instrument

- Viola campaniça

String instrument
- Other names: Viola campaniça
- Classification: String instrument
- Hornbostel–Sachs classification: (Composite chordophone)
- Developed: Vila Verde de Ficalho, South-eastern Portugal.

Related instruments
- Viola caipira, Viola beiroa, Viola braguesa, Viola da terra, Viola de arame, Viola sertaneja, Viola terceira, Viola toeira, Viola amarantina.

The viola campaniça is a portuguese stringed musical instrument from Vila Verde de Ficalho, in the Serpa Municipality (South-eastern Portugal). It has 10 steel strings in 5 courses, tuned C3 C2, F3 F2, C3 C3, E3 E3, G3 G3.

The adjective campaniço (kump-ah-NEE-soo) means literally "from the countryside".
