= Viola beiroa =

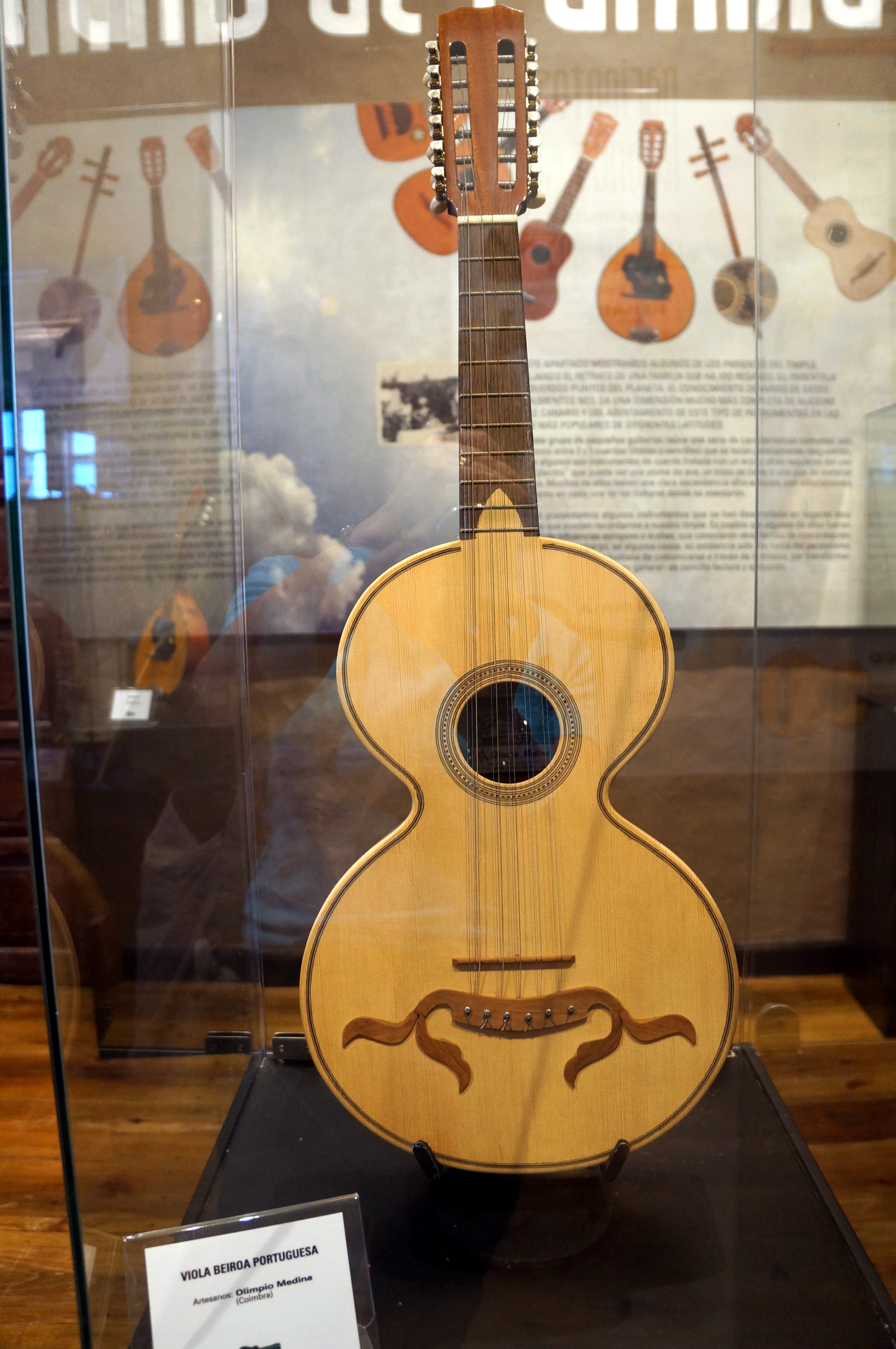
- Portuguese Viola Beiroa at the Casa Museo Del Timple, Lanzarote, Spain.

String instrument
- Classification: String instrument
- Hornbostel–Sachs classification: (Composite chordophone)
- Developed: Castelo Branco, Eastern Portugal

Related instruments
- Viola caipira, viola braguesa, viola campanica, viola da terra, viola de arame, viola sertaneja, viola Terceira, viola toeira, viola amarantina.

The viola beiroa is a stringed musical instrument from Castelo Branco, Eastern Portugal. It has 12 strings in 7 courses. The strings are made of steel. It is tuned D3, D3, A3 A2, D3 D2, G3 G2, B3 B3, D3 D3. The scale length is about 520mm.
