= Brommtopp =

The Brommtopp is a musical instrument consisting of a large drum covered by a skin, and a horse's hair whip that is rubbed with wax to make a droning rumbling sound. The instrument was commonly used by Mennonite mummers on New Year's Eve, men who often dressed as women and paraded around town performing the instrument in exchange for alcohol, dessert or other gifts. It was popularly used in Manitoba's West Reserve from the 1870s until the 1950s, and is occasionally performed today.
