= Viola da Terceira =

Stringed musical instrument from the Azores

String instrument
- Other names: viola Terceirense
- Classification: String instrument
- Hornbostel–Sachs classification: 321.322 (Composite chordophone)

Playing range
- (C2) E2 - B5

Related instruments
- Viola amarantina, viola de arame, viola caipira, viola beiroa, viola braguesa, viola campanica, viola da terra, viola sertaneja, viola toeira

The viola da Terceira (also viola Terceirense) is a stringed musical instrument of the guitar family, from the Portuguese islands of the archipelago of the Azores, associated with the island of Terceira.

== History ==
The viola and other string instruments were brought during the Portuguese maritime expansion to the Azores, Madeira, Cape Verde, Brazil and other locales, becoming common in the populations. Due to its importance in Portuguese music it likely arrived in Angola, Goa and Macau, and as far as Hawaii by the 19th century, where it became the forerunner of the ukulele. These early cordophones, the violas, had characteristics identical to the modern instruments, and great importance along the Iberian Peninsula, where it appeared in iconography, poems and diverse literature. The chronicler Gaspar Frutuoso, who identified it as just a "Viola", suggested that it first arrived in the Azores in the second half of the 19th century, brought the first settlers. There is little documentation that dates the arrival of the Portuguese Violas de Arame in the islands of the Azores.

In the second quarter of the 15th century, Santa Maria and São Miguel were the first islands to be settled. It is likely natural that these early string instruments arrived in the baggage of its first colonists. The oldest reference to this instrument appeared in documents associated with the sale of lands around 1479, where the property-owner received in trade four rams and a viola. But, no records show the type or number of instruments that arrived by Azorean colonists, and over time the construction of new violas based on the originals resulted in a substantial difference between island and continental instruments. Yet, the methods and materials used in its construction were basically the same.

The Azorean viola was the privilege of the nobility and wealthy people, creating strong roots in local culture, becoming party of the grooms marriage dowry in most cases.

== Instrument ==
The instrument exists in a 15-string/6-course version, an 18-string/6-course version, and an 18-string/7-course version, and resembles a small 12-string guitar with an extended headstock (to accommodate the additional strings). The sound box is typical "figure 8" guitar shaped, with typically a central circular sound hole; the fingerboard is fretted, with (commonly) 18 frets.

The 15-string instrument features six courses: three triple-strung bass courses and three double-strung treble courses. It is tuned, from lowest to highest pitched string, as follows:

- E3 E3 E2 • A3 A3 A2 • D4 D4 D3 • G4 G3 • B3 B3 • E4 E4

The 18-string 6-course instrument has six triple-strung courses, tuned as follows:

- E3 E3 E2 • A3 A3 A2 • D4 D4 D3 • G4 G4 G3 • B3 B3 B3 • E4 E4 E4

The 18-string 7 course instrument features: four triple-strung bass courses and three double-strung treble courses. It is tuned as follows:

- C3 C3 C2 • E3 E3 E2 • A3 A3 A2 • D4 D4 D3 • G4 G3 • B3 B3 • E4 E4

Note that the lowest pitched (7th) course is frequently tuned to pitches other than 'C', at the player's discretion, to accommodate the music. The tuning to C is common, but not standard.
