= Viola de arame =

Stringed instrument from Madeira

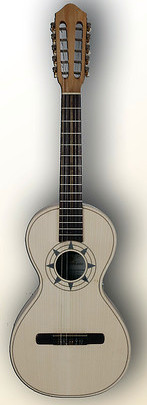

String instrument
- Other names: Viola da Madeira
- Classification: String instrument
- Hornbostel–Sachs classification: (Composite chordophone)
- Developed: Madeira

Related instruments
- Viola caipira, Viola beiroa, Viola braguesa, Viola campanica, Viola da terra, Viola sertaneja, Viola terceira, Viola toeira, Viola amarantina.

The Viola de arame is a stringed musical instrument from the Portuguese island of Madeira. It has 9 (sometimes 10) strings in 5 courses. The strings are made of steel.

== Tuning ==
It is tuned G3 G2, D3 D2, G3 G3, B3 (B3), D3 D3 so "Open G Major".

The two lowest courses are tuned in octaves. The three higher ones are tuned in unison. However, the 2nd highest course is a single string instead of a pair like the rest (there are also 10 string Versions w/ 5 pairs of strings).

The scale length is about 560mm.
