= Viola amarantina =

Viola Amarantina
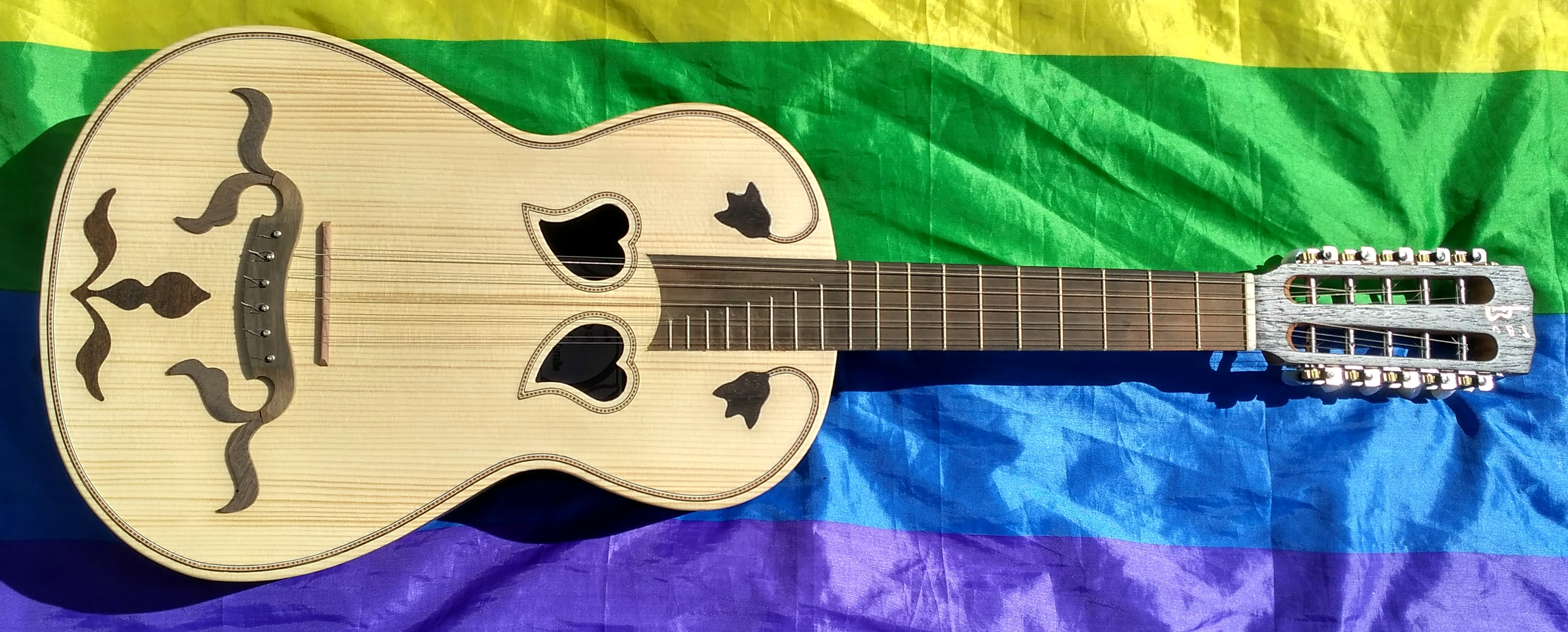
- Viola Amarantina

String instrument
- Other names: Viola de Amarante, Viola de dois corações.
- Classification: String instrument
- Hornbostel–Sachs classification: (Composite chordophone)
- Developed: Amarante, Northern Portugal

Related instruments
- Viola caipira, viola beiroa, viola braguesa, viola campaniça, viola da terra, viola de arame, viola sertaneja, viola terceira, viola toeira.

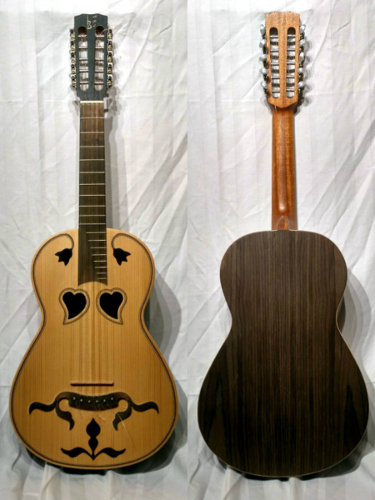
Front and back views of Viola Amarantina.

The viola amarantina is a stringed musical instrument from Amarante, Northern Portugal. It is also named viola de dois corações (two-hearted guitar) because of the two heart-shaped frontal openings. It has 10 strings in 5 courses. The strings are made of steel. It is tuned A3 A3, F# F#, B2 B3, G2 G3, D2 D3.

It is traditional to construct the viola amarantina from walnut for the sides, pine for the soundboard and the neck in mahogany.

The viola amarantina is also sometimes played in Cabo Verde.
