= Viola da terra =

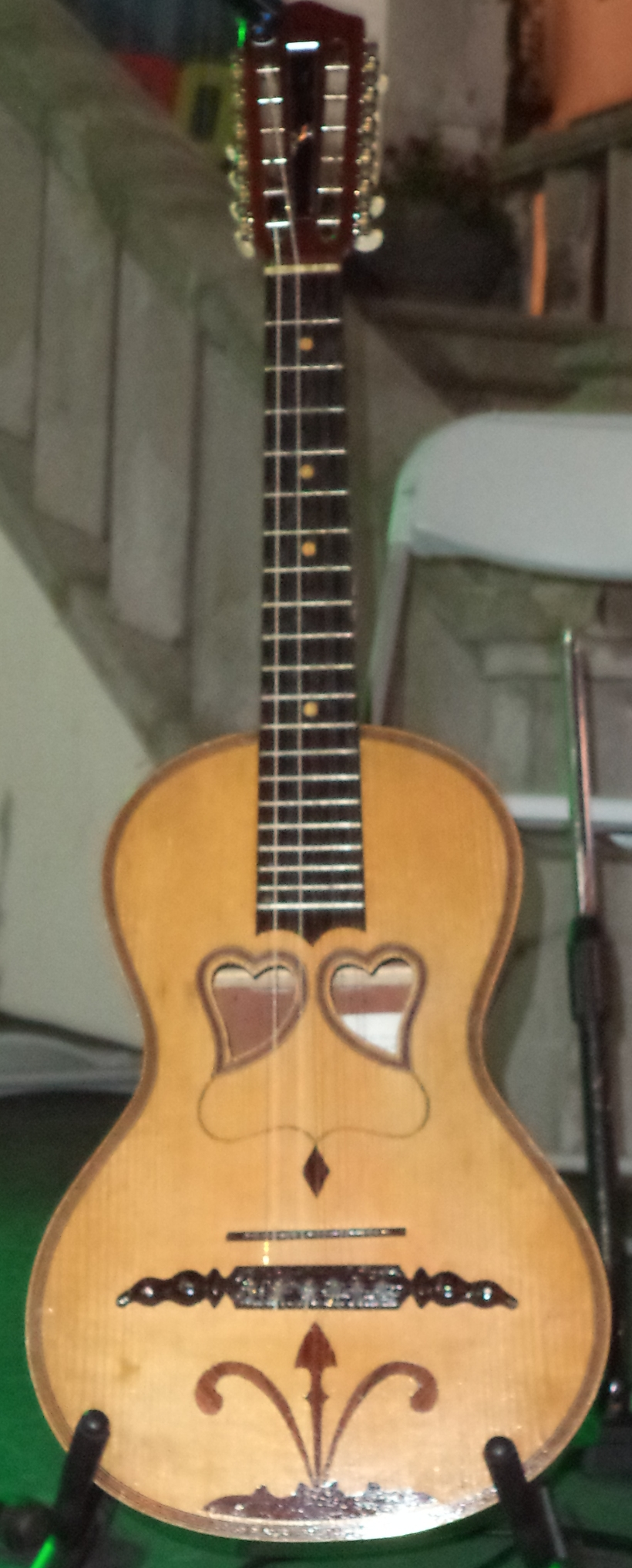
- Viola da terra

String instrument
- Classification: String instrument
- Hornbostel–Sachs classification: (Composite chordophone)

Related instruments
- Viola caipira, Viola beiroa, Viola braguesa, Viola campanica, Viola de arame, Viola sertaneja, Viola terceira, Viola toeira, Viola amarantina.

Viola da terra is a stringed musical instrument from the islands of the Azores, closely associated with the saudade genre of Portuguese music. Its 12 or 15 metal strings are arranged in either five or six courses.

== Construction ==
The viola da terra is constructed of wood with a traditional guitar "hourglass" shape for the body, a fretted neck, and headstock supporting the tuners. Traditionally the viola da terra had wooden friction pegs inserted from behind the headstock (see illustration), rather than the "watch-key" mechanism used on Portuguese instruments such as the Guitarra Portuguesa. Nowadays the Viola da terra usually has machine heads, similar to those of the classical guitar.

What at first glance appears to be the bridge is actually just the support for the bridge pins, which anchor the lower end of the strings. The bridge saddle is a separate piece, which sits on the soundboard of the instrument, in front of the bridge pin plate. Like all Portuguese violas, the number of bridge pins does not match the number of strings, and often there are two or three strings on each pin.

Scale length is about 540mm (about 21.3 inches), shorter than the modern classical guitar scale of about 655mm (about 25.8 inches). 22-24 metal frets are set into the fingerboard. One unusual distinguishing feature of the viola da terra is that the portion of the fingerboard which passes over the instrument's body is set flush with the top face of the soundboard. Another distinctive feature, which it shares with the Viola amarantina is the use of a pair heart-shaped sound holes, although the instrument is occasionally made with a single round sound hole.

The instrument is much lighter in construction than the classical guitar, using thinner tone woods, which permits a considerable volume of sound, despite the instrument's small size and light strings.

There is also a smaller version (about three-quarter size) called a Requinto.

== Tuning and further info ==
Strings are generally of metal, and very light gauge, due to the instrument's light construction. The lowest pitched "A" and "D" strings are wound, as is the lowest "E" string on 15-string instruments. All other strings are of plain, unwound steel.

With 12 strings, the lower 2 courses have 3 strings each (2 of them high octaves and the third a low octave), and the higher 3 courses have 2 strings each, all tuned in unison. It is tuned A3 A3 A2•D4 D4 D3•G3 G4•B3 B3•D4 D4. On traditional Viola da Terras, the A3 and G4 strings are yellow.

With 15 strings and five courses, each course is triple strung, and the tunings is A3 A3 A2•D4 D4 D3•G3 G3 G3•B3 B3 B3•D4 D4 D4; with 15 strings and six courses, the lower three courses are triple strung and the upper three courses are double strung: E3 E3 E2•A3 A3 A2•D4 D4 D3•G3 G3•B3 B3•D4 D4 -- similar to the Viola terceira.

== Gallery ==
Viola da terra

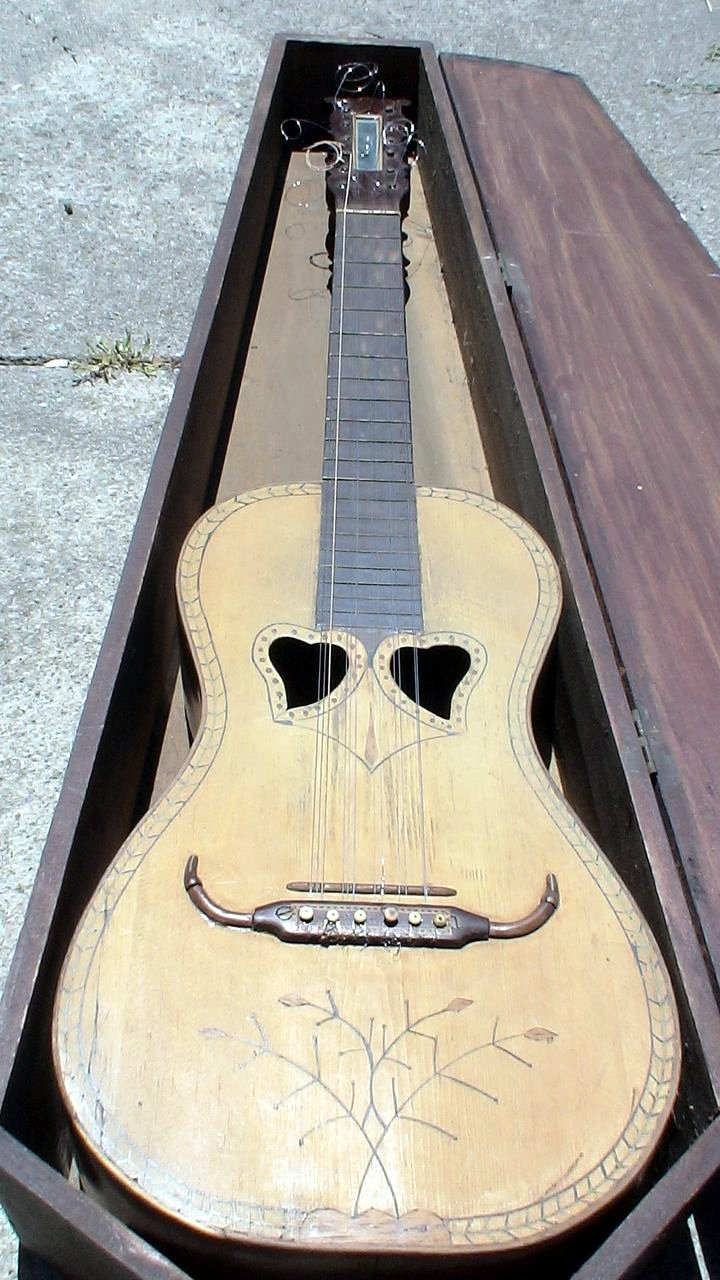
An antique Viola da terra in its case.

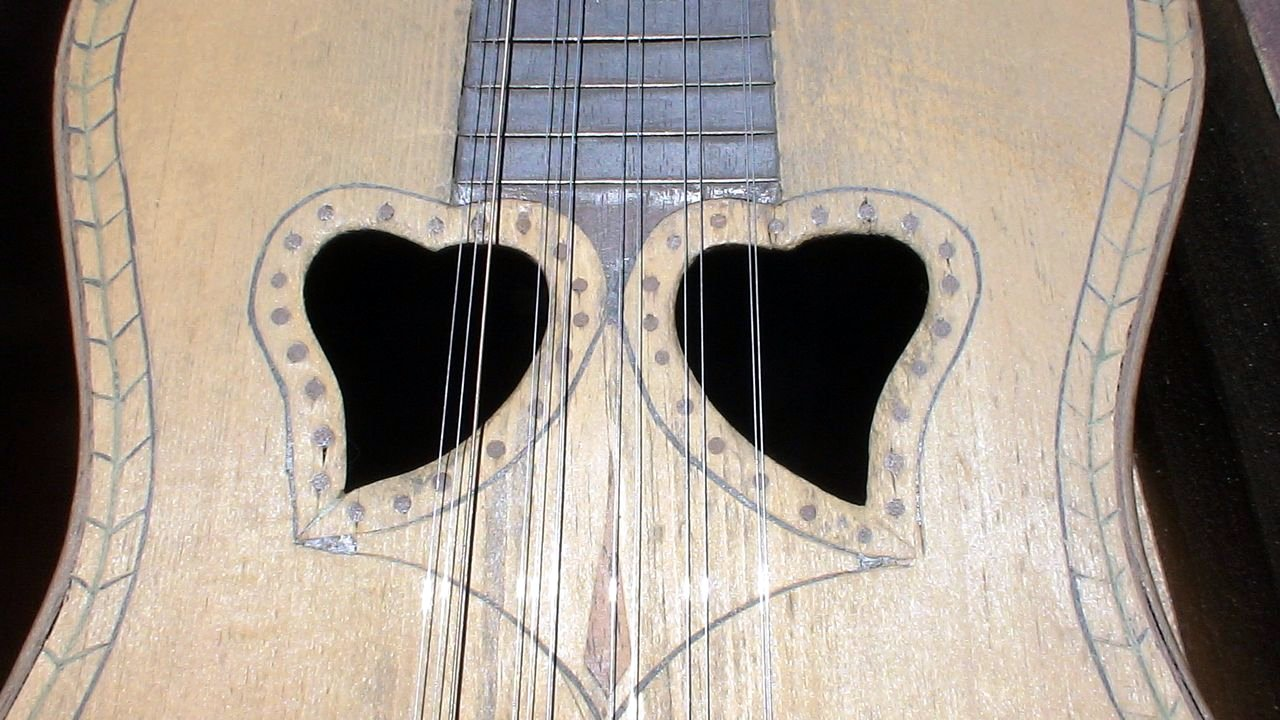
A close-up, showing the string arrangement and sound-holes of the Viola da terra

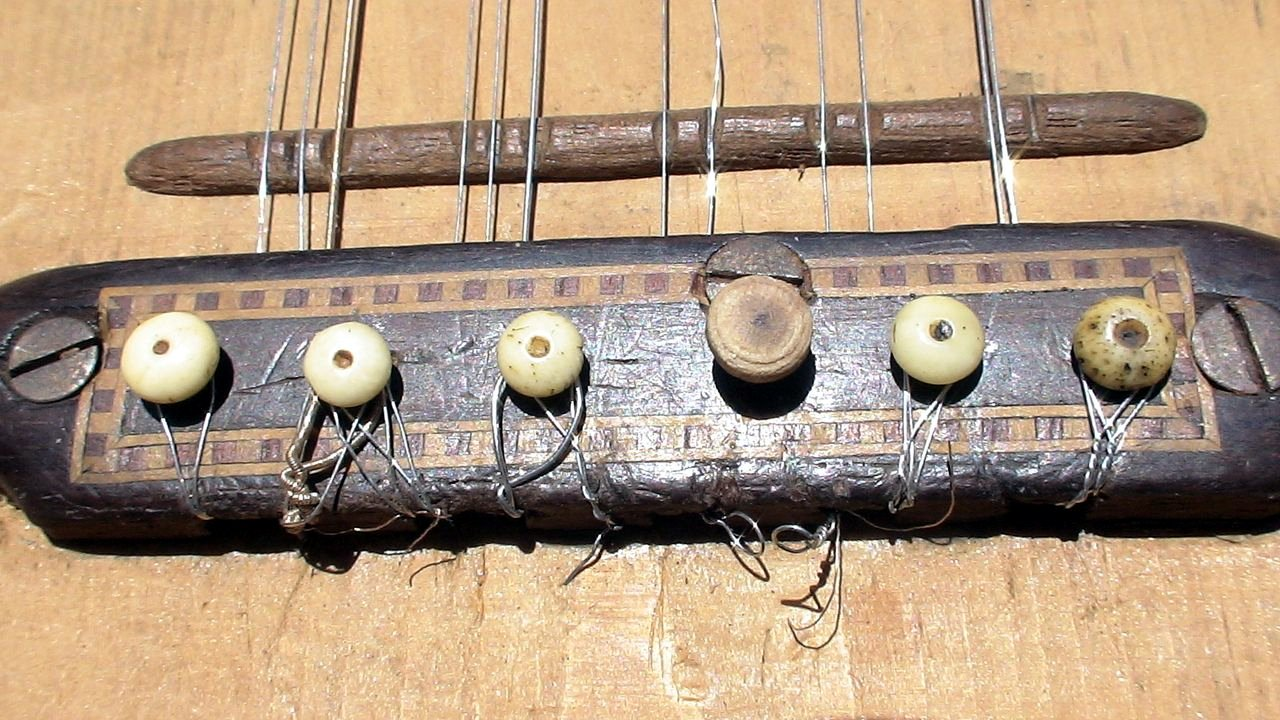
A close-up, showing the bridge and saddle of the Viola da terra.
