= Machete (musical instrument) =

Portuguese stringed musical instrument

- Classification: String instrument (plucked, nylon stringed instrument usually played with the bare thumb and/or fingertips, or a felt pick)
- Hornbostel–Sachs classification: (Composite chordophone)
- Developed: in Madeira, Portugal

Related instruments
- Bowed and plucked string instruments, in particular the cavaquinho, and its descendant, the ukulele

The machete (Portuguese: machete de braga) is a small stringed instrument from Madeira, Portugal. It has a double bulged body, traditionally made of wood, with a small rib and has four metallic strings, which depending on the region, may be attached by wooden pegs. Its slightly larger cousin, the machete de rajão, has five metal strings. Nowadays, it is not uncommon for the instrument to be made out of linden or poplar. Historians believe the machete was introduced in Madeira from Braga as a braguinha and subsequently brought to Hawaii by Portuguese immigrants in the late 19th century as a possible predecessor of the ukulele.

== See also ==
- Rajão
- Cavaquinho
- Ukulele
