= Viola toeira =

Portuguese stringed instrument

Viola Toeira
- A Viola Toeira, with typical soundboard decoration and bridge design.

String instrument
- Classification: String instrument
- Hornbostel–Sachs classification: (Composite chordophone)

Related instruments
- Viola caipira, Viola beiroa, Viola braguesa, Viola campanica, Viola da terra, Viola de arame, Viola sertaneja, Viola da Terceira, Viola amarantina.

The viola toeira is a stringed musical instrument from Portugal. It has 12 strings in five courses. The strings are made of steel. It is tuned A3 A3 A2, D3 D3 D2, G3 G2, B3 B3, E3 E3.

The name of the instrument comes from the strings used on the third course – "toeiras". It is characterized by having a standard or small neck-to string-length ration, high bridge position, oval soundhole and headstock with an open design. The viola toeira is a larger version of the viola braguesa.

The body of the viola toeira is slender in shape, similar to the baroque guitar. Like most Portuguese violas, it has a typical bridge design in which the bridge and saddle are separate. The strings are first tied round a piece of wood that is glued to the soundboard, and then run over a separate floating bridge that is left unglued.
