= Viola braguesa =

Stringed musical instrument from Portugal

String instrument
- Classification: String instrument
- Hornbostel–Sachs classification: (Composite chordophone)
- Developed: Braga, north-western Portugal

Related instruments
- Viola caipira, Viola beiroa, Viola campaniça, Viola da terra, Viola de arame, Viola sertaneja, Viola terceira, Viola toeira, Viola amarantina.

Viola braguesa is a stringed instrument from Braga in northwestern Portugal. It has 10 strings in 5 courses. The strings are made of steel. It is tuned C_{4}/C_{3}–G_{4}/G_{3}–A_{4}/A_{3}–D_{4}/D_{4}–G_{4}/G_{4}. The scale length is about 500 mm (20 inches).

== Requinta ==
Many Portuguese violas, such as the Viola braguesa, have smaller requinto versions also, called 'requinta'. The viola braguesa requinta is tuned: A_{4}/A_{3}–C_{5}/C_{4}–F_{5}/F_{4}–C♯_{5}/C♯_{5}–E_{5}/E_{5}. This tuning is a fifth above the standard Viola braguesa.

== See also ==
- Viola caipira
- Cavaquinho
- Bandolim
- Guitarra portuguesa
