= Cavaquinho =

Small Portuguese plucked string instrument of the European guitar family

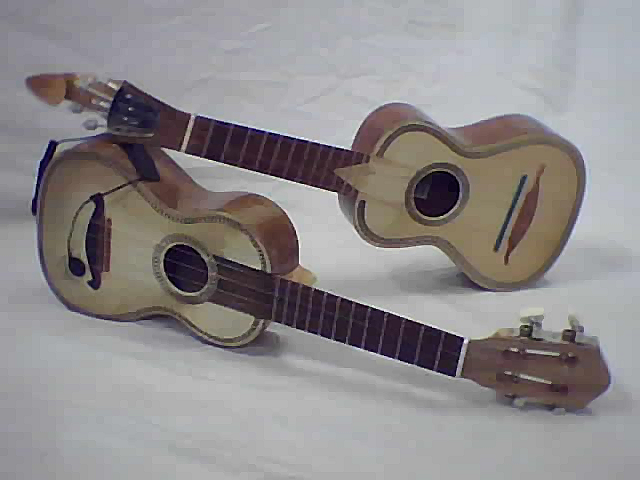
- Portuguese cavaquinhos

String instrument
- Other names: Machete, braguinha, manchete, cavaco
- Classification: String instrument
- Hornbostel–Sachs classification: (Composite chordophone)
- Developed: Portugal

Related instruments
- Ukulele, Viola braguesa, Cuatro

The cavaquinho (European Portuguese pronunciation: [kɐvɐˈkiɲu]) is a small Portuguese string instrument in the European guitar family, with four wires or gut strings.

A cavaquinho player is called a cavaquista.

== Tuning ==
A common tuning in Portugal is C G A D (non-reentrant with C being the lowest pitch, or from lower to higher pitches).

The standard tuning in Brazil is D G B D.

Other tunings include:

- D A B E – Portuguese ancient tuning, made popular by Júlio Pereira, reentrant with A being the lowest pitch
- G G B D
- A A C^{♯} E
- D G B E – used for solo parts in Brazil
- G D A E – mandolin tuning
- G C E A – ‘cavacolele’ tuning, the same as the soprano/tenor ukulele
- D G B E – the same as the highest four strings in standard guitar tuning, often used by guitarists, and the same tuning used for the baritone ukulele

== Forms ==
There are several forms of cavaquinho used in different regions and for different styles of music. Separate varieties are named for Portugal, Braga (braguinha), Minho (minhoto), Lisbon, Madeira, Brazil, and Cape Verde; other forms are the braguinha, ‘cavacolele’, cavaco, machete, and ukulele.

=== Machete and braguinha ===
The machete is a variety of the cavaquinho from Madeira. It is a predecessor of the modern ukulele. The Machete de Braga (“Braga-style machete”) is called a braguinha.

=== Minhoto ===
The minhoto cavaquinho, associated with the Minho region in Portugal is similar to the viola braguesa. Its neck is on the same level as the body. Like the braguesa, the minhoto's sound hole was traditionally shaped like a stylized ray (fish); the shape is called “raia” in Portuguese.

== International use ==
Different forms of cavaquinho have been adapted in different regions. Varieties used outside of Iberia are found in Brazil, Cape-Verde, and Madeira. The locally iconic Caribbean region cuatro family and the Hawaiian ukuleles were both adapted from the cavaquinho.

=== Brazil ===
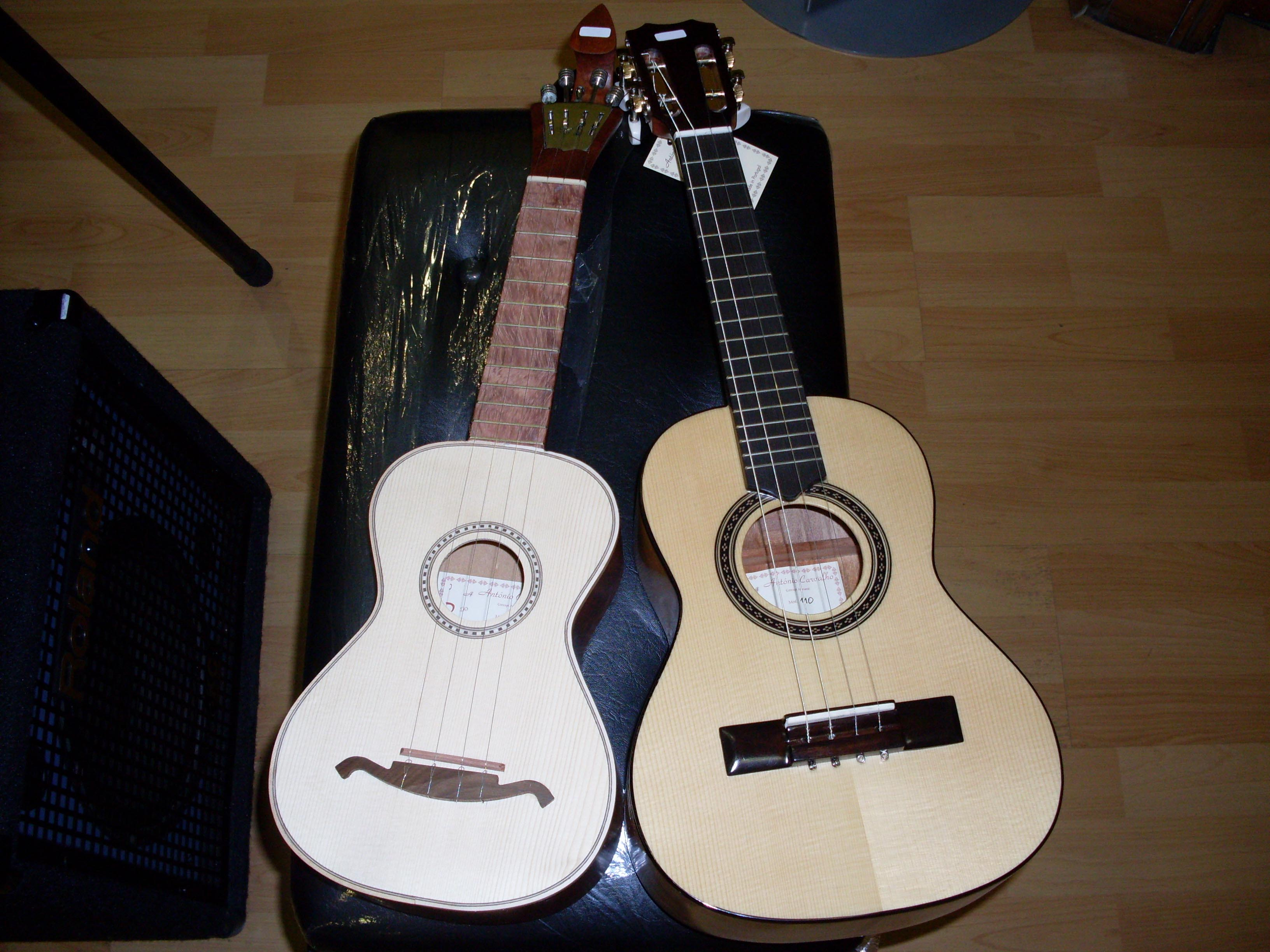
Portuguese and Brazilian cavaquinhos

The Brazilian cavaquinho is slightly larger than the Portuguese cavaquinho, resembling a small classical guitar. Its neck is raised above the level of the sound box, and the sound hole is usually round, like cavaquinhos from Lisbon and Madeira.

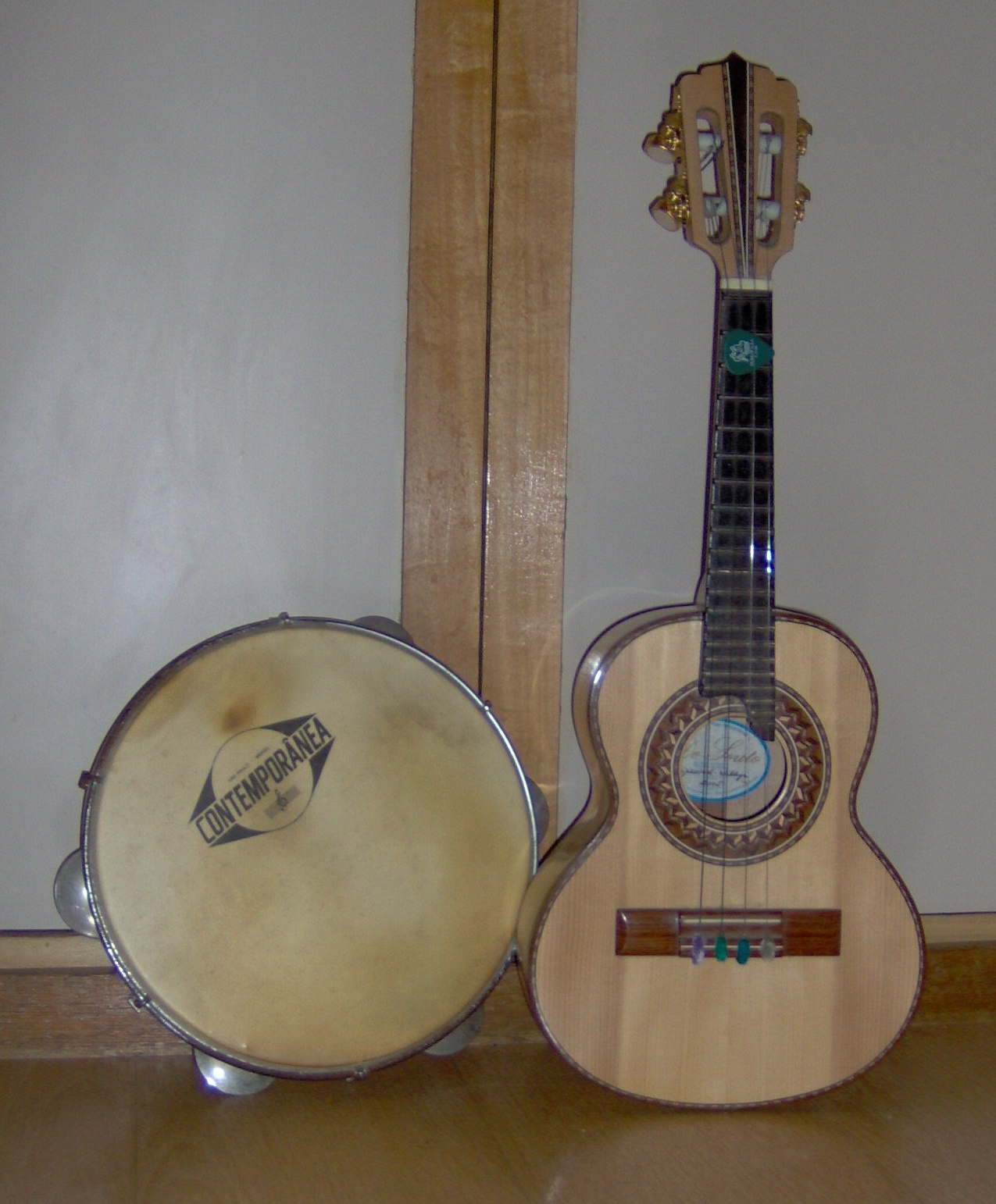
A samba cavaco (right).

The cavaquinho is a very important instrument in Brazilian samba and choro music. It is played with a pick, with sophisticated percussive strumming beats that connect the rhythm and harmony by playing the rhythm “comping”. Some of the most important players and composers of the Brazilian instrument are Waldir Azevedo, Paulinho da Viola, and Mauro Diniz.

=== Cape Verde ===
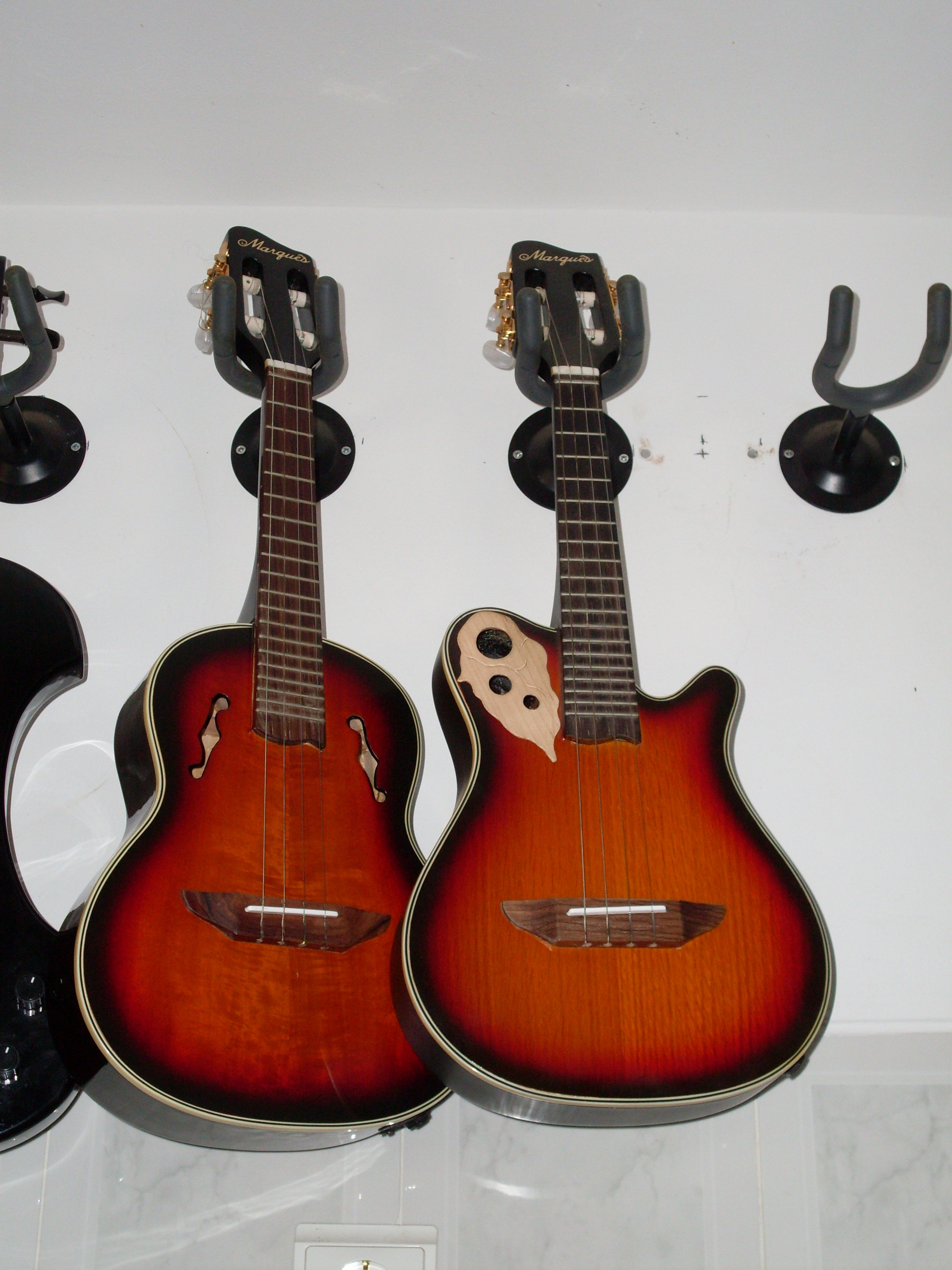
Two cavaquinhos in Cape Verde.

In Cape Verde the cavaquinho was introduced in the 1930s from Brazil. The present-day Cape-Verdean cavaquinho is very similar to the Brazilian one in dimensions and tuning. It is generally used as a rhythmic instrument in Cape-Verdean music genres (such as morna, coladeira, mazurka) but it is occasionally used as a melodic instrument.

=== Hawaii ===
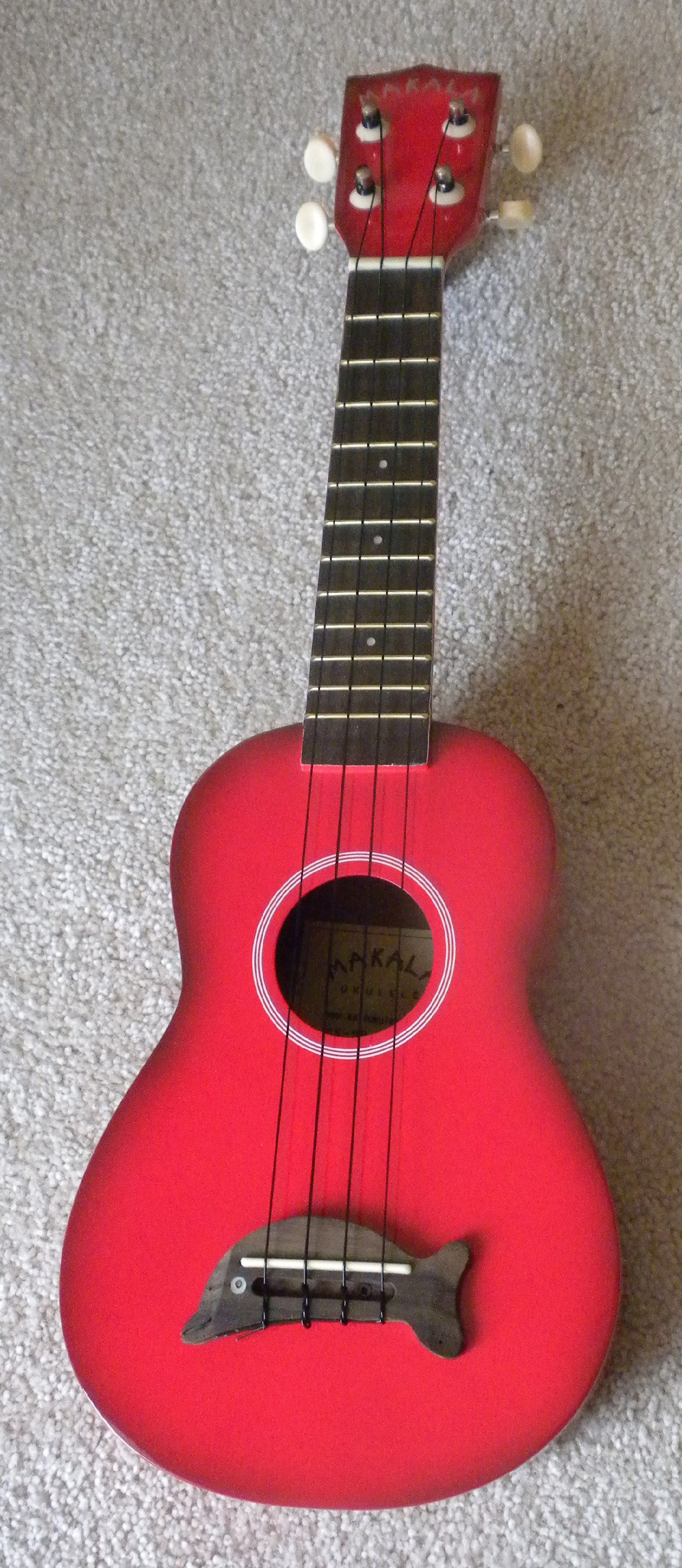
A modern ukulele.

The Hawaiian ukulele also has four strings and a shape similar to the cavaquinho, although tuned differently – usually G C E A.

The ukulele is an iconic element of Hawaiian popular music, which spread to the continental United States in the early 20th century. It was developed from the braguinha and rajão, brought to Hawaii in the late 19th century by Portuguese immigrants from Madeira Island.

The machete was introduced into Hawaii by Augusto Dias, Manuel Nunes, and João Fernandes in 1879, which further influenced the development of the ukulele.

=== Northern Latin America and the Caribbean ===
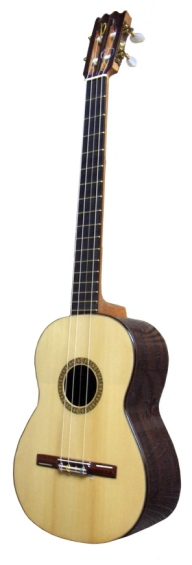
Venezuelan Concert Cuatro.

The cuatro is a family of larger 4-stringed instruments derived from the cavaquinho that are popular in Latin-American countries in and around the Caribbean. Versions of the iconic Venezuelan cuatro are very similar to the Brazilian cavaquinho, with a neck laid level with the sound box, like a Portuguese cavaquinho.

== Origins ==
The origins of this Portuguese instrument are elusive. Author Gonçalo Sampaio holds that the cavaquinho and the guitar may have been brought to Braga by the Biscayans.

Sampaio explains Minho region’s archaic and Hellenistic modes by possible survival of Greek influences on the ancient Gallaeci of the region, and stresses the link between this instrument and historical Hellenistic tetrachords.

== See also ==
- Tenor guitar
- Charango
