= Caipira viola =

Brazilian string musical instrument

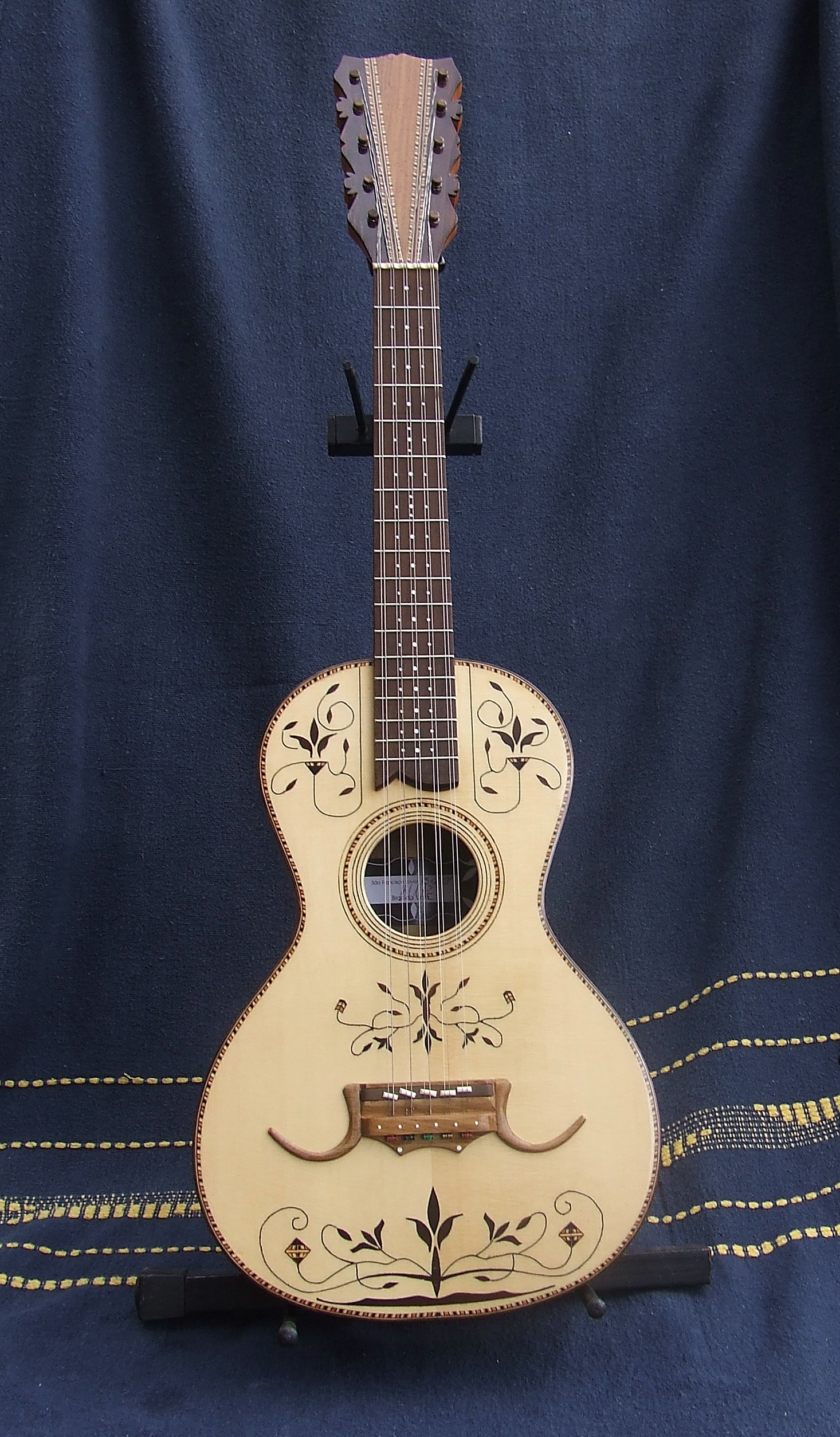
- Traditional model with fine marquetry work

String instrument
- Other names: Caipira guitar
- Classification: String instrument
- Hornbostel–Sachs classification: (Composite chordophone)
- Developed: Brazil

The Caipira viola or Caipira guitar (in Portuguese: Viola caipira), is a Brazilian ten-string guitar with five courses of strings arranged in pairs. It is a variation of the Portuguese viola, serving as a basis for Caipira music, especially for subgenres of Caipira folklore, such as moda de viola, caipira pagode, catira, etc.

== Origins ==
It has its origins in Portuguese violas. Violas are direct descendants of the Latin guitar, which, in turn, has an Arabic-Persian origin derived from instruments such as the lute. The Portuguese violas arrived in Brazil and along with other instruments began to be used by the Jesuits in the catechism of the indigenous people, and naturally, for Portuguese-Brazilian settlers and ranchers entertainment and company. Later, guitars began to be built with noble wood from the land, which has always been available in large quantities in Brazil. It is likely a descendant of one of the many folk guitars that have traditionally been played in Portugal. The viola braguesa and viola amarantina, for instance, are two types of ten-string guitars from the north of Portugal, which are closely related to the Caipira viola.

Some have described the Caipira viola as Brazil's national instrument, but others argue that the tambourine-like pandeiro has a stronger claim. The Brazilian Embassy in Washington lists a national flower among the official symbols of Brazil, but no national musical instrument.

== Tuning and playing technique ==
A large number of tunings are used; open tunings are common. Unlike most steel-string guitars, its strings are plucked with the fingers of the right hand similarly to the technique used for classical and flamenco guitars, rather than by the use of a plectrum.

== Popularity ==
Violas are present in nearly all Brazilian music forms, anywhere in the country (although it is declining in some places). It most often associated with Caipira music, with some forms of North-Eastern music and with folkloric music. It was once used to play urban music, like choro, samba and Maxixe, but has been replaced by the acoustic guitar.

Well-known players of Brazilian viola include Zé Côco do Riachão (composer from Minas Gerais), Toninho Ramos (composer from Minas Gerais live in France) and Almir Sater (successful singer-songwriter from Mato Grosso do Sul).

A National Association of Viola Players (Associação Nacional dos Violeiros) has been founded in 2004 and the Ministry of Culture has declared the preservation of the Viola tradition as of national interest.

== Notable performers ==
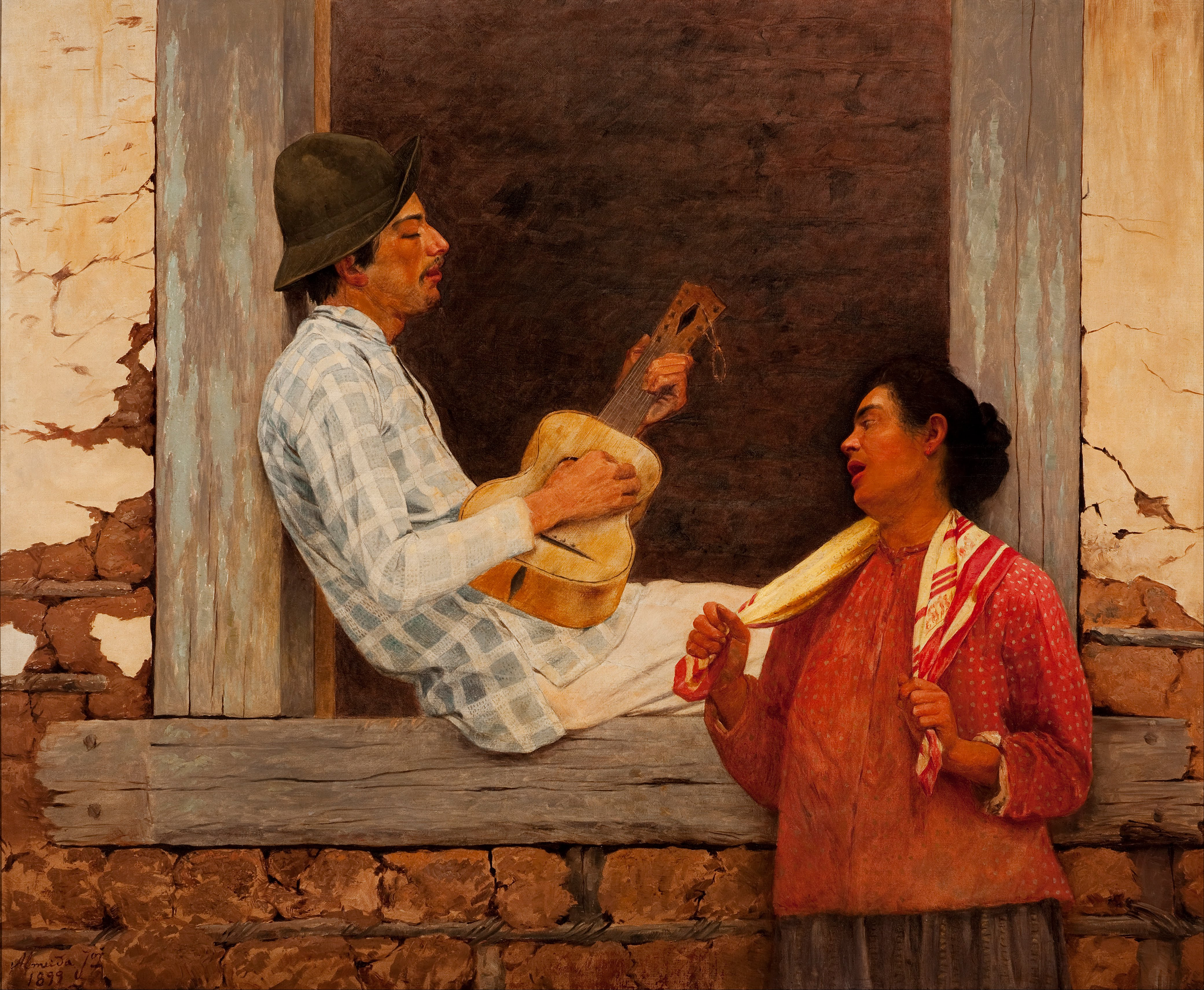
The Guitar Player, by Almeida Júnior

- Almir Sater
- Andréa Carneiro
- Arnaldo Freitas
- Bambico (artistic name of Domingos Miguel dos Santos)
- Bemti
- Braz da Viola
- Bruna Viola
- Cleiton Torres
- Chico Lobo
- Divino
- Helena Meirelles
- Fernando Sodre
- Heraldo do Monte
- Inezita Barroso
- Ivan Vilela
- Fabienne Magnant (France)
- João Mulato (Wilson Leoncio de Melo)
- Juliana Andrade
- Mazinho Quevedo
- Nestor da Viola
- Ramon Thiesen
- Renato Andrade
- Roberto Corrêa
- Teddy Vieira
- Tião Carreiro (artistic name of José Dias Nunes)
- Tião do Carro
- Thacio
- Toninho Ramos
- Zé Mulato

== See also ==
- Brazilian seven-string guitar
- Viola braguesa
- Viola sertaneja
- Viola toeira
- Viola de cocho
- Rabeca
